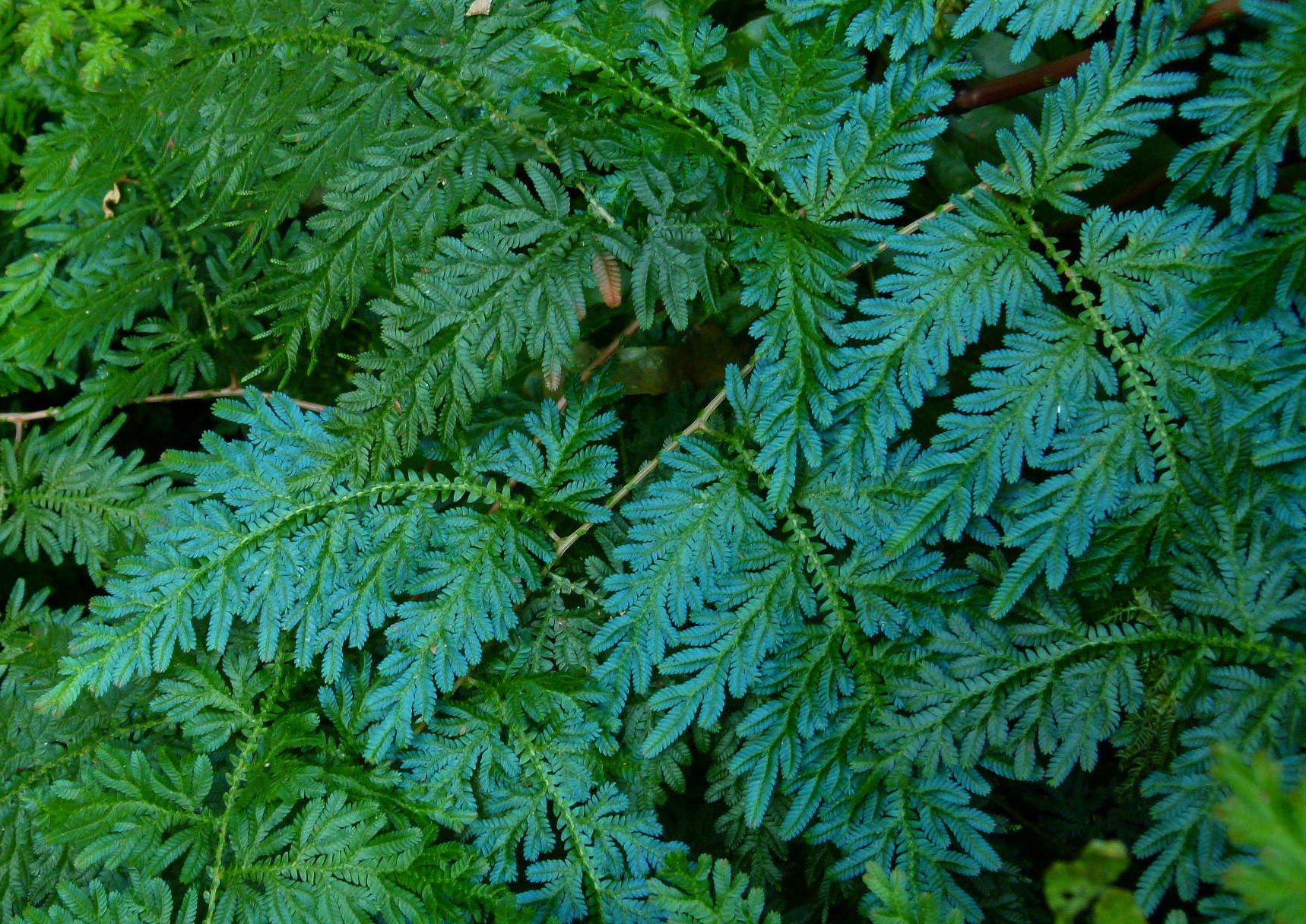

Scientific classification
- Kingdom: Plantae
- Clade: Tracheophytes
- Clade: Lycophytes
- Class: Lycopodiopsida
- Order: Selaginellales
- Family: Selaginellaceae
- Genus: Selaginella
- Species: S. willdenowii

Binomial name
- Selaginella willdenowii (Desv. ex Poir.) Baker

Synonyms
- Lycopodium willdenowii Desv.

= Selaginella willdenowii =

Species of plant

Selaginella willdenowii is a species of vascular plant in the Selaginellaceae family. It is a spikemoss known by the common names Willdenow's spikemoss and peacock fern (a name shared with S. Uncinata) due to its iridescent blue leaves. Like other Selaginallales, it is fern ally and not a true fern.

Selaginella willdenowii is sometimes spelt incorrectly as Selaginella willdenovii.

== Description ==
The blue iridescence is produced by thin-film interference in a thin layer of cells with lamellar structure present in the upper cuticle of leaves. It is suggested that this adaptation reduces the effect of strong sun beams filtering through the canopy that would otherwise damage shade-adapted species. Blue iridescence is found also Selaginella uncinata and both species are adapted for extreme shade below the forest canopy.
