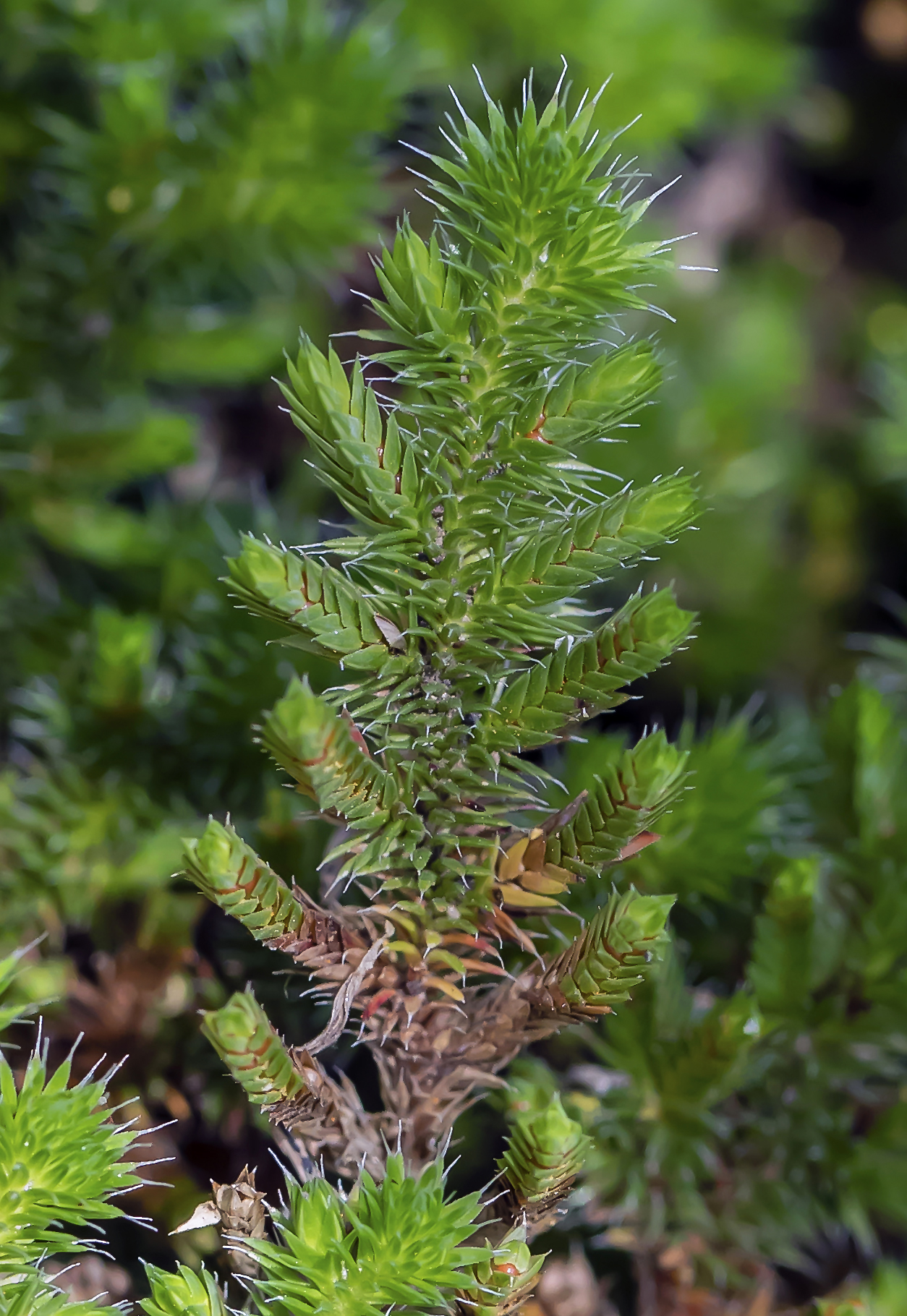

Conservation status
- Vulnerable (NatureServe)

Scientific classification
- Kingdom: Plantae
- Clade: Tracheophytes
- Clade: Lycophytes
- Class: Lycopodiopsida
- Order: Selaginellales
- Family: Selaginellaceae
- Genus: Selaginella
- Species: S. hansenii

Binomial name
- Selaginella hansenii Hieron.

= Selaginella hansenii =

Species of spore-bearing plant

Selaginella hansenii is a species of spikemoss known by the common name Hansen's spikemoss. It is endemic to California where it can be found throughout the central part of the state, from the lowest reaches of the Cascade Range through the Central Coast Ranges and Sierra Nevada to the southern end of the Central Valley and the Tehachapis. It can be found in varied rocky habitat in hills and mountains. This lycophyte forms loose or dense mats of spreading stems with small, forking branches. The lance-shaped or triangular leaves are up to 5 or 6 millimeters long including the soft, white bristles at the tips. The leaves are green, often tinged with red, or totally red. The strobili containing the reproductive structures are under a centimeter long.
