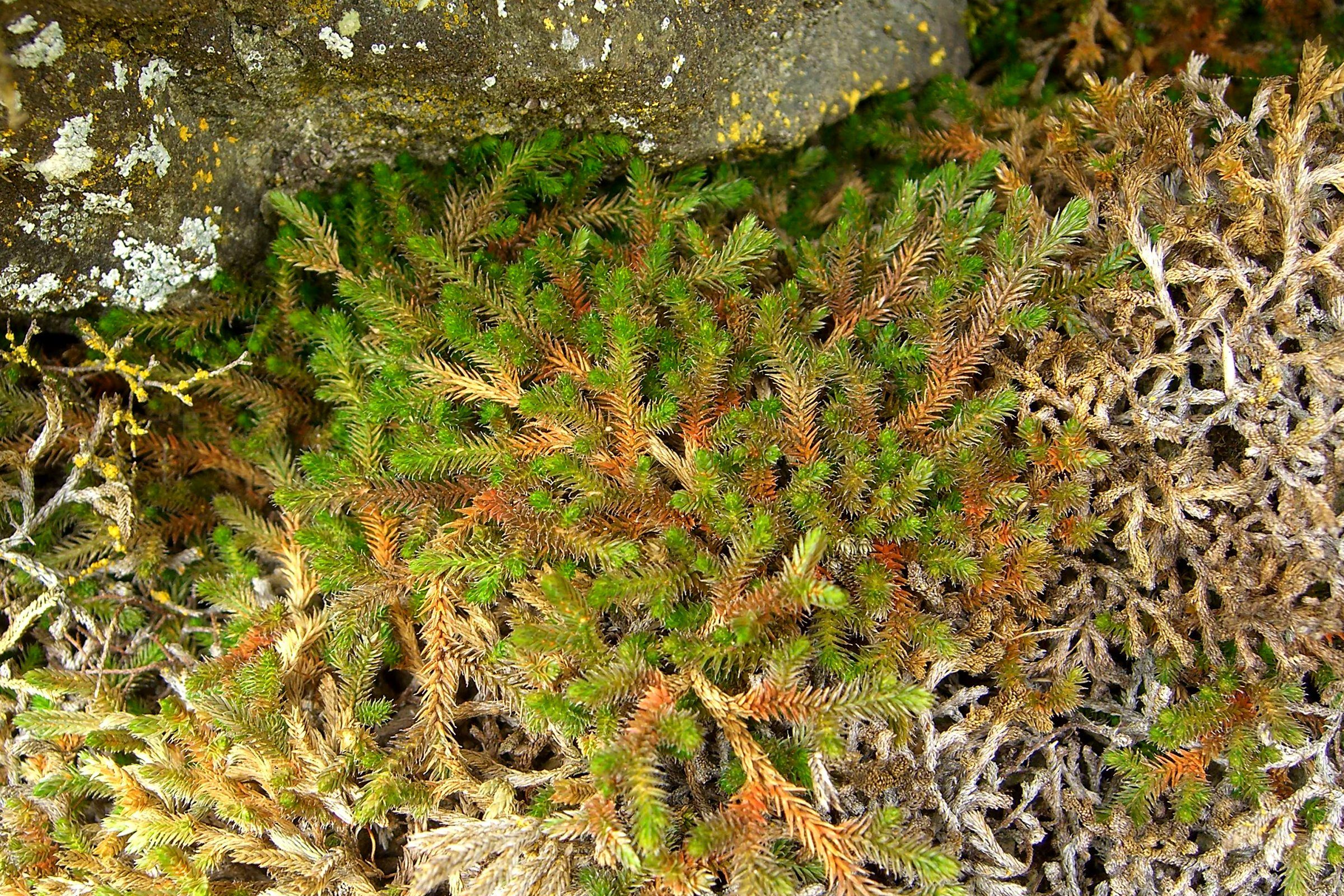

Scientific classification
- Kingdom: Plantae
- Clade: Tracheophytes
- Clade: Lycophytes
- Class: Lycopodiopsida
- Order: Selaginellales
- Family: Selaginellaceae
- Genus: Selaginella
- Species: S. wallacei

Binomial name
- Selaginella wallacei Hieron.

= Selaginella wallacei =

Species of spore-bearing plant

Selaginella wallacei is a species of spikemoss known by the common name Wallace's spikemoss. It is native to western North America from British Columbia to California to Montana, where it can be found in many types of habitat, including open and shaded areas, and wet to dry environments, often growing on and over rocks. This lycophyte is variable in appearance, its form depending on the habitat it grows in. It can be spreading with many narrow branches, or a small, dense mat. The forking stems grow up to about 25 centimeters long, but may remain much shorter in dry conditions. They are lined with linear, lance-shaped, or oblong leaves up to 4 millimeters long including the bristles at the tips. The strobili containing the reproductive structures may be quite long, reaching up to 9 centimeters.
