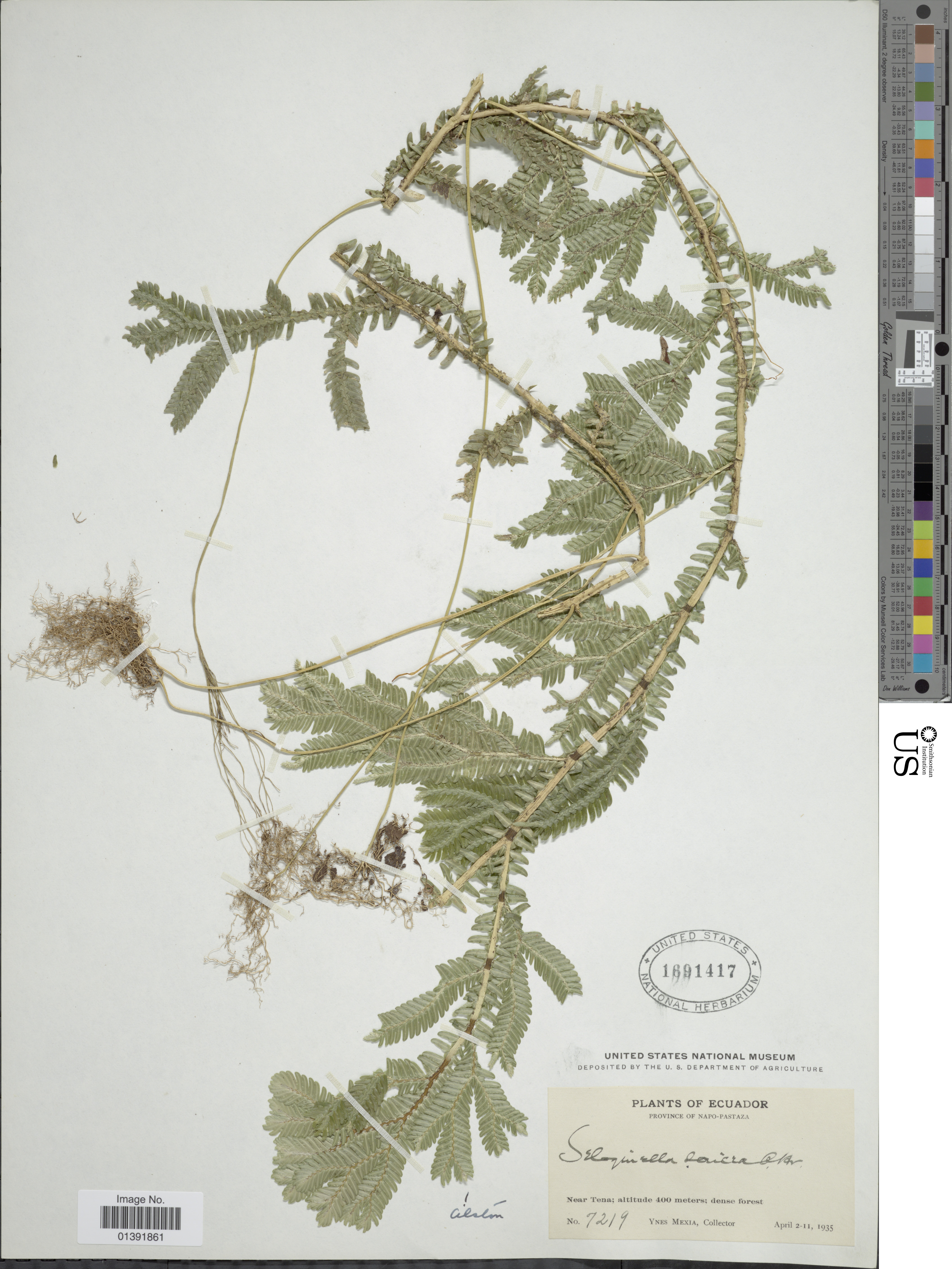
- Herbarium specimen

Conservation status
- Near Threatened (IUCN 3.1)

Scientific classification
- Kingdom: Plantae
- Clade: Tracheophytes
- Clade: Lycophytes
- Class: Lycopodiopsida
- Order: Selaginellales
- Family: Selaginellaceae
- Genus: Selaginella
- Species: S. sericea

Binomial name
- Selaginella sericea A.Braun

Synonyms
- Lycopodioides sericea (A.Braun) Kuntze

= Selaginella sericea =

Species of spore-bearing plant

Selaginella sericea is a species of plant in the Selaginellaceae family. It is endemic to Ecuador. Its natural habitat is subtropical or tropical moist lowland forest and subtropical or tropical moist montane forest. It is threatened by habitat loss.
