= Selaginella sibirica =

Conservation status
- Apparently Secure (NatureServe)

Scientific classification
- Kingdom: Plantae
- Clade: Tracheophytes
- Clade: Lycophytes
- Class: Lycopodiopsida
- Order: Selaginellales
- Family: Selaginellaceae
- Genus: Selaginella
- Species: S. sibirica

Binomial name
- Selaginella sibirica (Milde) Hieron

Species of spore-bearing plant

Selaginella sibirica, the Siberian spikemoss, is a species of spikemoss that can be found in dry or exposed rocks and ridges from Alaska to the northwestern region of the district of Mackenzie as well as in northern Russia. The linear leaves are grooved on the back, 2.5-3 millimeters long, including the seta, and usually truncate near the top. Sporophylls are ovate to triangular, and are shorter than the leaves. It looks similar to S. densa, though it can be distinguished by its white setae, compared to the yellow setae of S. densa. Although all discovered specimens in North America are all similar, R.M. Tryon found a phase in Asia that has longer setae that are orange-brown rather than white.
