= Selaginella carinata =

Conservation status
- Vulnerable (IUCN 3.1)

Scientific classification
- Kingdom: Plantae
- Clade: Tracheophytes
- Clade: Lycophytes
- Class: Lycopodiopsida
- Order: Selaginellales
- Family: Selaginellaceae
- Genus: Selaginella
- Species: S. carinata

Binomial name
- Selaginella carinata R.M.Tryon

Species of spore-bearing plant

Selaginella carinata is a species of plant in the Selaginellaceae family. It is endemic to Ecuador. Its natural habitat is subtropical or tropical moist montane forests and it is threatened by habitat loss.
