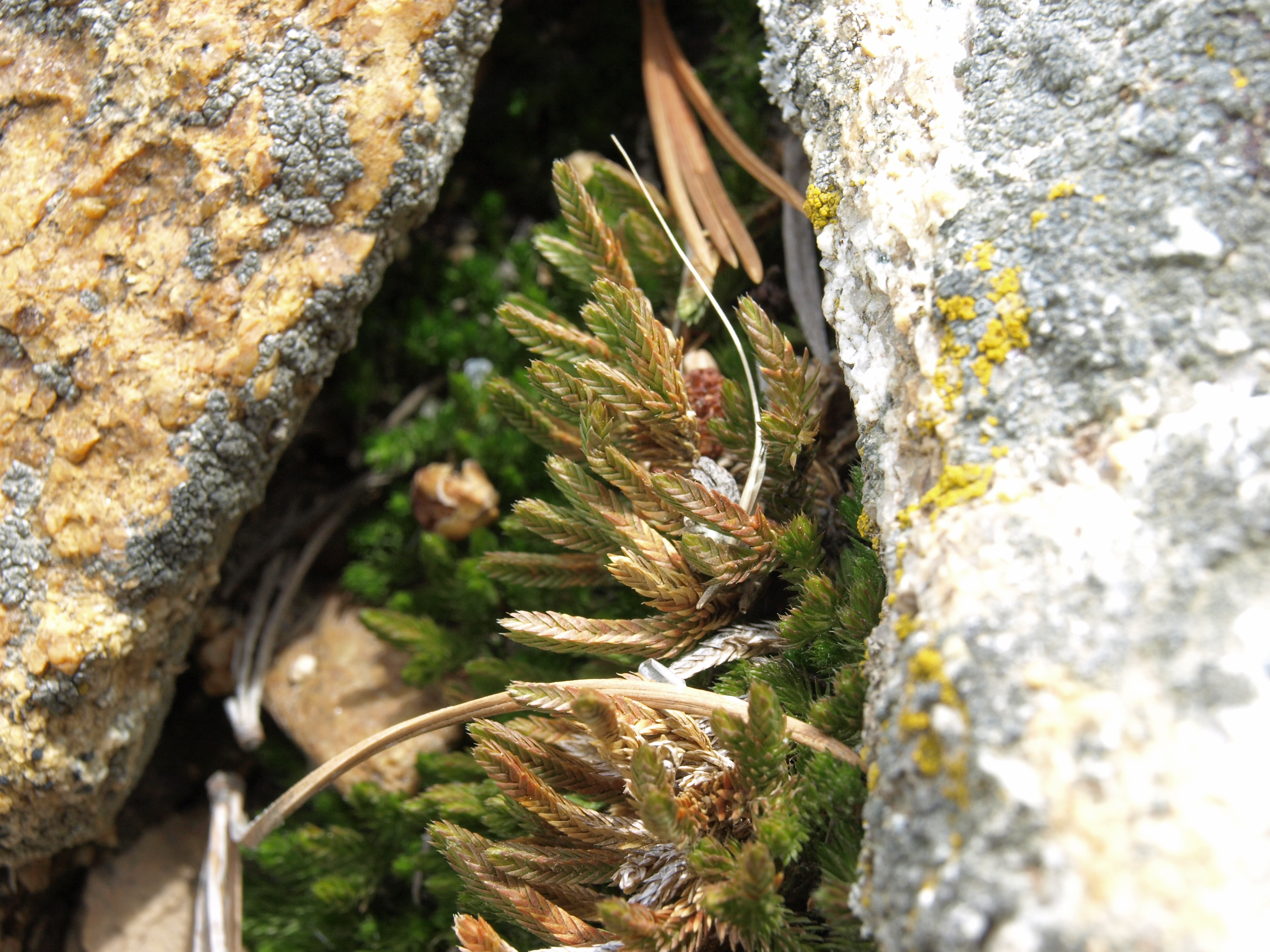
- In the White Mountains, California

Conservation status
- Apparently Secure (NatureServe)

Scientific classification
- Kingdom: Plantae
- Clade: Tracheophytes
- Clade: Lycophytes
- Class: Lycopodiopsida
- Order: Selaginellales
- Family: Selaginellaceae
- Genus: Selaginella
- Species: S. watsonii

Binomial name
- Selaginella watsonii Underw.

= Selaginella watsonii =

Species of spore-bearing plant

Selaginella watsonii is a species of spikemoss known by the common name Watson's spikemoss. It is native to the western United States, where it grows in many rocky habitat types, including high mountain peaks in alpine climates. This lycophyte forms mats or cushions of short, forking stems. They are lined with linear or lance-shaped leaves no more than 4 millimeters long, often tipped with tiny bristles. The strobili containing the reproductive structures are 1 to 3 centimeters long.
