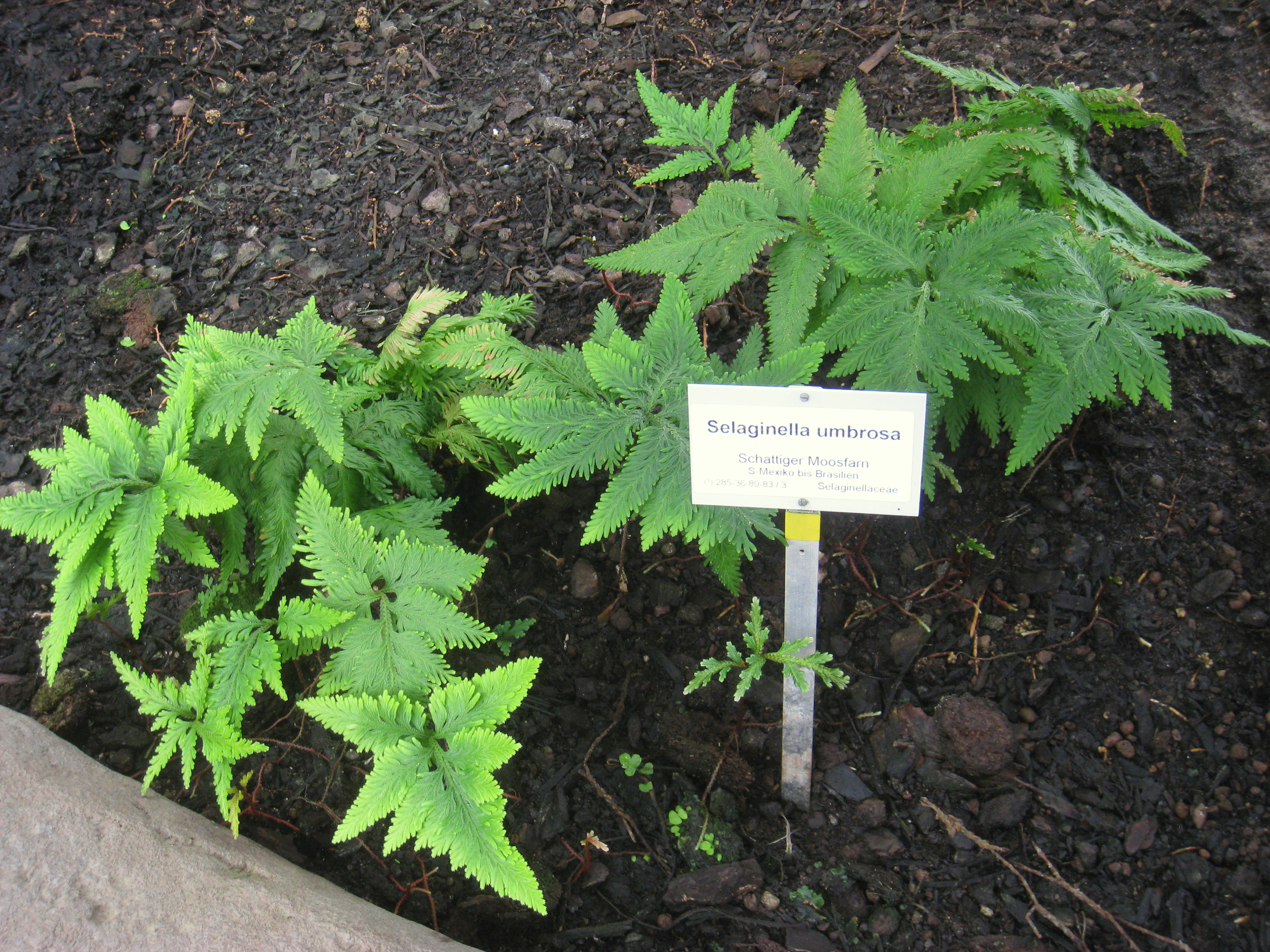

Scientific classification
- Kingdom: Plantae
- Clade: Tracheophytes
- Clade: Lycophytes
- Class: Lycopodiopsida
- Order: Selaginellales
- Family: Selaginellaceae
- Genus: Selaginella
- Species: S. umbrosa

Binomial name
- Selaginella umbrosa Lem. ex Hieron.

= Selaginella umbrosa =

Species of spore-bearing plant

Selaginella umbrosa is a species of plant in the Selaginellaceae family.

Umbrosa is native to South America, ranging from Yucatán to Colombia and Venezuela. It can be found in Barbados and Tobago, where it is most likely not native. It has also been introduced to the Island of Hawaii, where it was first seen cultivated in 1994, and then wild in 2000. The plant prefers to grow in shaded areas

The plant's stem is typically 8–25 centimeters long before branching, usually red in color. The branched portion is 10–25 centimeters, usually at a 45- to 90-degree angle from the stem.

In the traditional medicine of Belize, the plant is used to treat bladder infections, skin fungus, and mental illness.

== Sources ==
- GBIF entry
