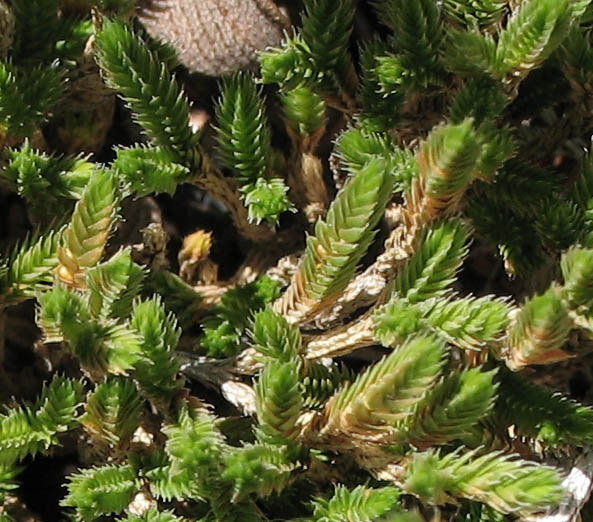

Conservation status
- Apparently Secure (NatureServe)

Scientific classification
- Kingdom: Plantae
- Clade: Tracheophytes
- Clade: Lycophytes
- Class: Lycopodiopsida
- Order: Selaginellales
- Family: Selaginellaceae
- Genus: Selaginella
- Species: S. bigelovii

Binomial name
- Selaginella bigelovii Underw.

= Selaginella bigelovii =

Species of spore-bearing plant

Selaginella bigelovii is a species of spikemoss known by the common names bushy spikemoss and Bigelow's spikemoss. It is native to California and Baja California, where it grows in rocky places in many different habitat types, from the coastline to the mountains to the deserts. This lycophyte forms clumps of spreading upright to erect stems up to 20 cm long with a few short lateral branches. The linear or lance-shaped green leaves are up to 4 mm long, including the tiny rigid bristles at their tips. They are either flattened to the stem or stick out very slightly. The strobili borne at the leaf bases are yellow-orange in color.
