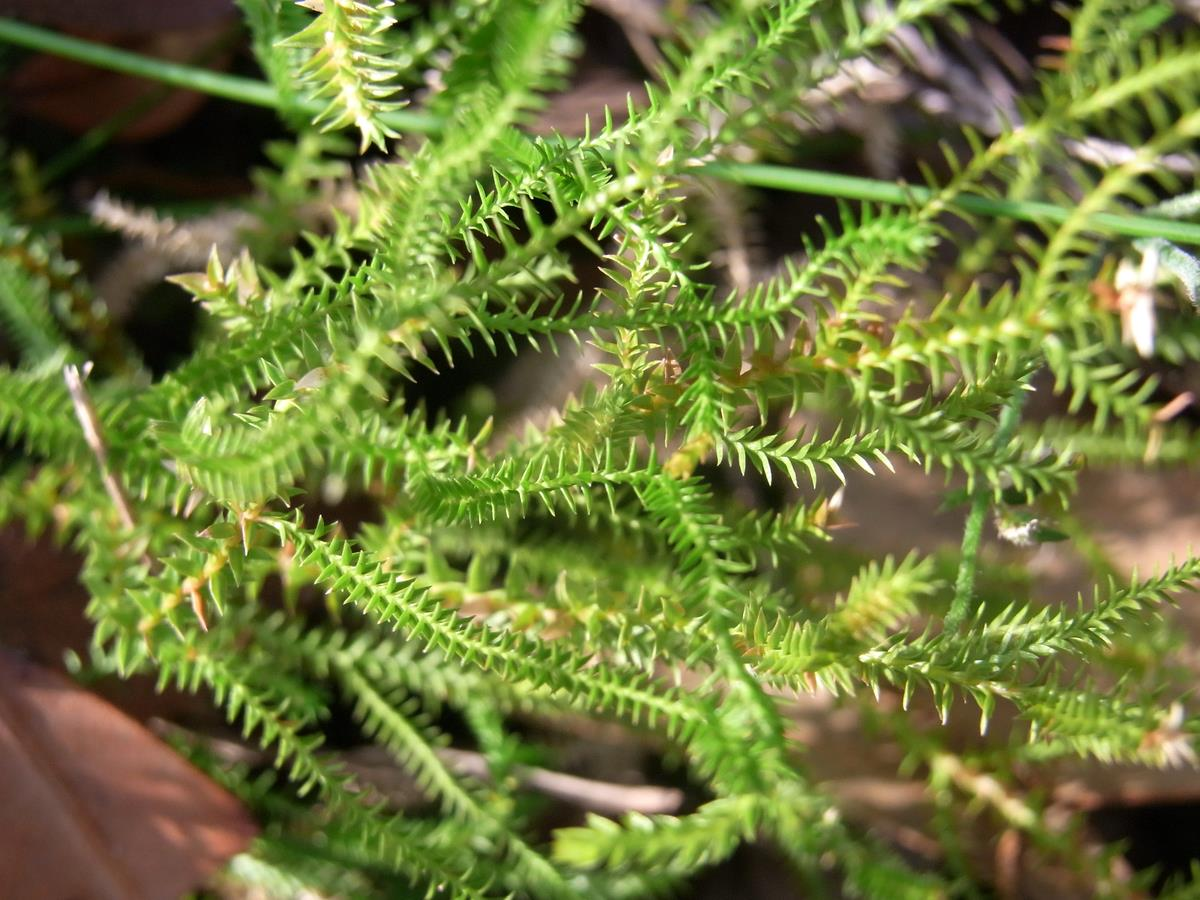
- Ku-ring-gai Chase National Park, Australia

Conservation status
- Least Concern (NCA)

Scientific classification
- Kingdom: Plantae
- Clade: Tracheophytes
- Clade: Lycophytes
- Class: Lycopodiopsida
- Order: Selaginellales
- Family: Selaginellaceae
- Genus: Selaginella
- Species: S. uliginosa

Binomial name
- Selaginella uliginosa (Labill.) Spring

Synonyms
- Lycopodium uliginosum Labill.; Lycopodioides uliginosa (Labill.) Kuntze

= Selaginella uliginosa =

Swamp selaginella

Species of spikemoss

Selaginella uliginosa is a small plant in the spikemoss family Selaginellaceae which is endemic to Australia. An ancient and primitive plant, usually under 10 centimetres tall, it is often seen in sunny moist areas. The specific epithet uliginosa is from Latin, referring to the plant's preference for growing in swampy locations.

== Taxonomy ==
This species was first described by the French biologist Jacques Labillardière, based on specimens he collected during his journey to Australia in 1792. He placed it in the clubmosses, giving it the name Lycopodium uliginosum. In 1891 the German botanist Otto Kuntze transferred it to the genus Lycopodioides (a name meaning "similar to Lycopodium") combined with the species epithet uliginosa. That genus is now recognised as a synonym of Selaginella, and this species was formally transferred to it by the German/Belgian botanist Antoine Frédéric Spring in 1843.

=== Etymology ===
The species epithet uliginosa is from the Latin word ūlīginōsa, meaning marshes or wetlands, and is a reference to the preferred habitat of the plant.
