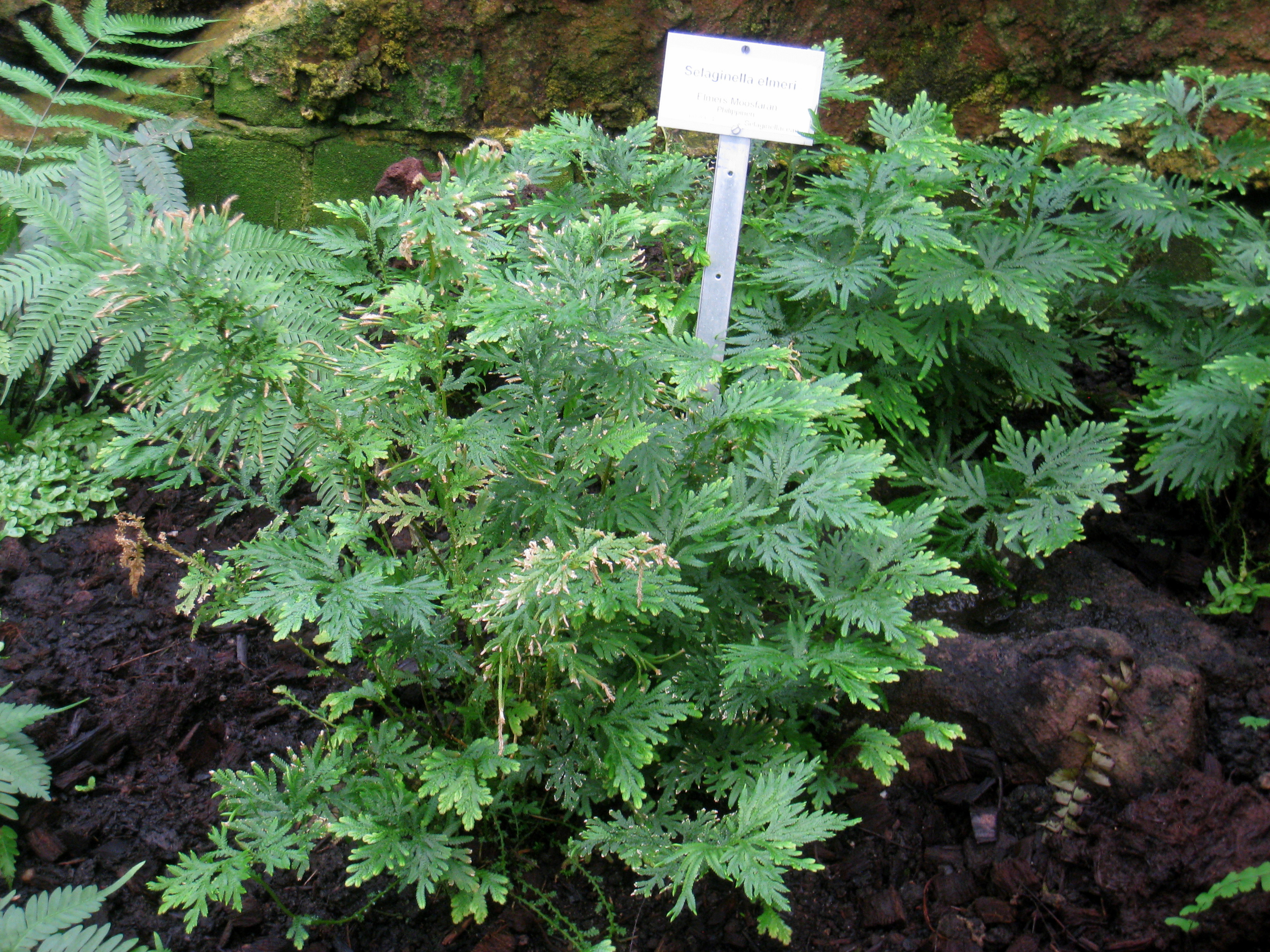

Scientific classification
- Kingdom: Plantae
- Clade: Tracheophytes
- Clade: Lycophytes
- Class: Lycopodiopsida
- Order: Selaginellales
- Family: Selaginellaceae
- Genus: Selaginella
- Species: S. elmeri

Binomial name
- Selaginella elmeri Hieron.

= Selaginella elmeri =

Species of spore-bearing plant

Selaginella elmeri is a species of plant in the Selaginellaceae family.

== Sources ==
- GBIF entry
