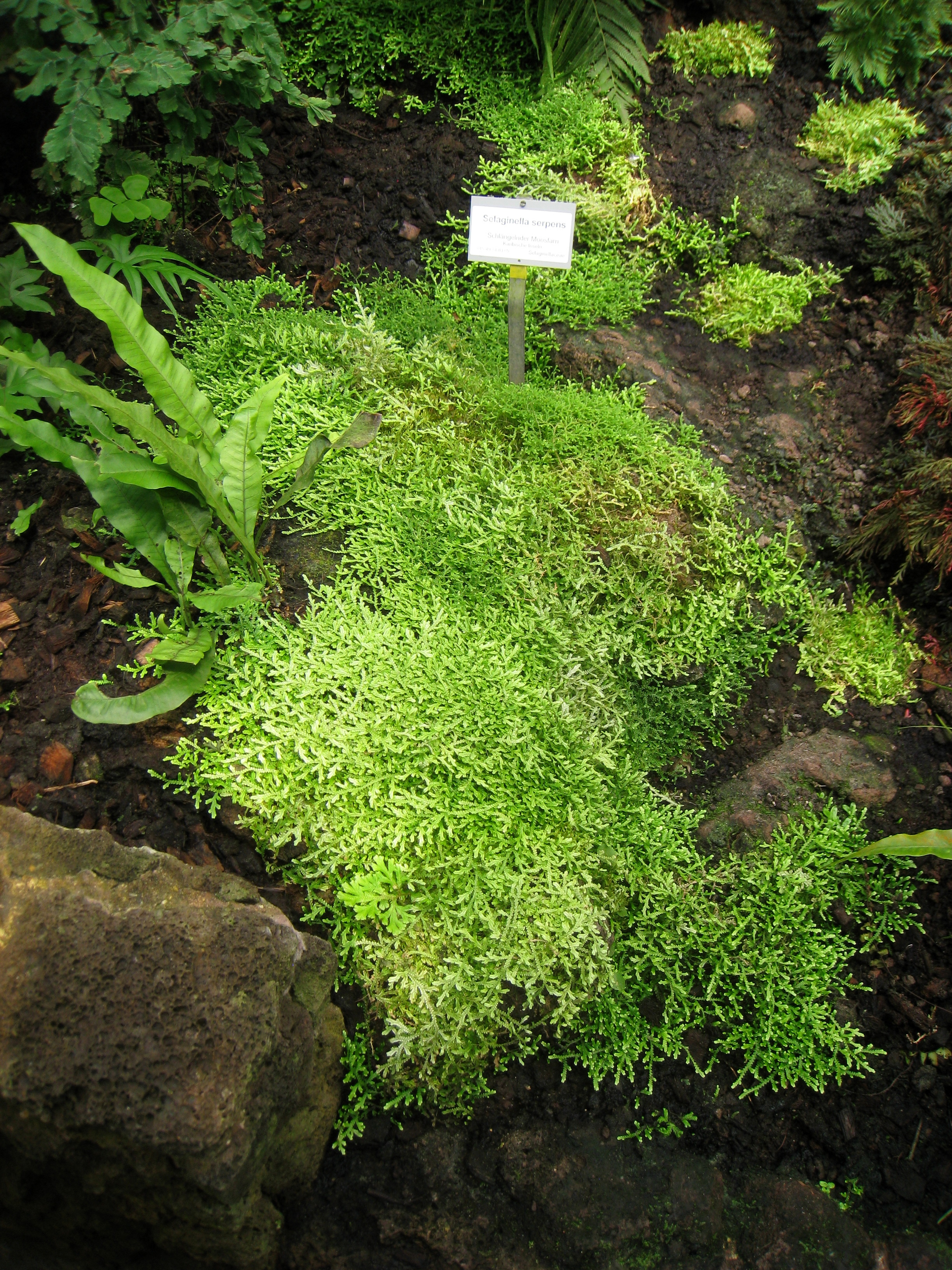

Scientific classification
- Kingdom: Plantae
- Clade: Tracheophytes
- Clade: Lycophytes
- Class: Lycopodiopsida
- Order: Selaginellales
- Family: Selaginellaceae
- Genus: Selaginella
- Species: S. serpens

Binomial name
- Selaginella serpens (Desv. ex Poir.) Spring

= Selaginella serpens =

Species of spore-bearing plant

Selaginella serpens is a species of plant in the family Selaginellaceae: found mostly in the Caribbean.
