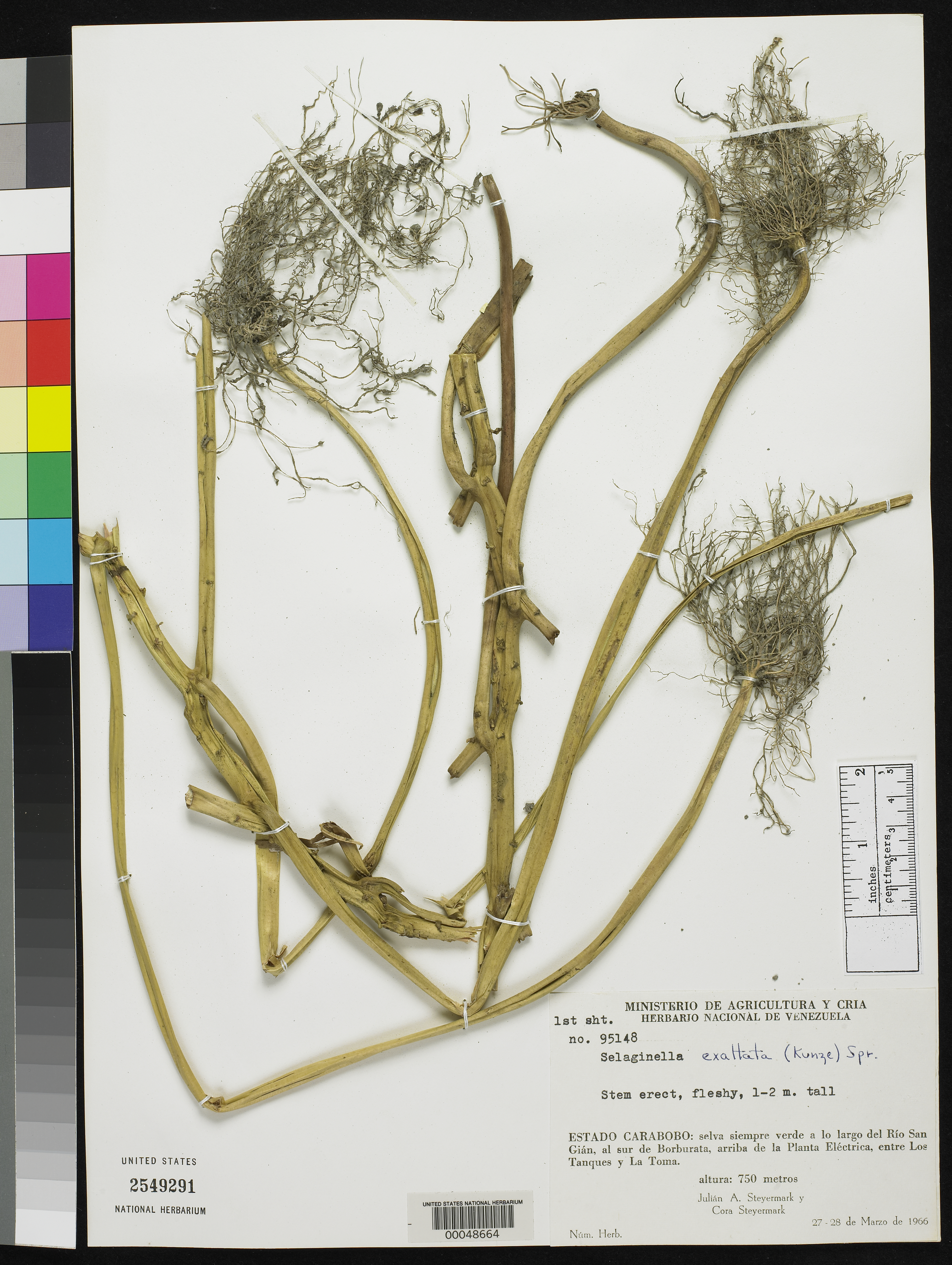

Scientific classification
- Kingdom: Plantae
- Clade: Tracheophytes
- Clade: Lycophytes
- Class: Lycopodiopsida
- Order: Selaginellales
- Family: Selaginellaceae
- Genus: Selaginella
- Species: S. gigantea

Binomial name
- Selaginella gigantea Steyerm. & A.R.Sm.

= Selaginella gigantea =

Species of spike moss

Selaginella gigantea (family Selaginellaceae) is a spikemoss endemic to the montane rainforests of Venezuela, at an altitude of around 750 metres (2,460 ft). It is noteworthy in being the only Selaginella species which is a true shrub, being up to 6.5 feet (2.0 m) in height and about half as wide. The leaves do not exceed 0.2 inches (0.51 cm) in length by 1/18 inch (1.4 mm) in width. Strobili are up to 2 centimetres (0.79 in) long by up to 1/12 inch (2.1 mm) in width.
