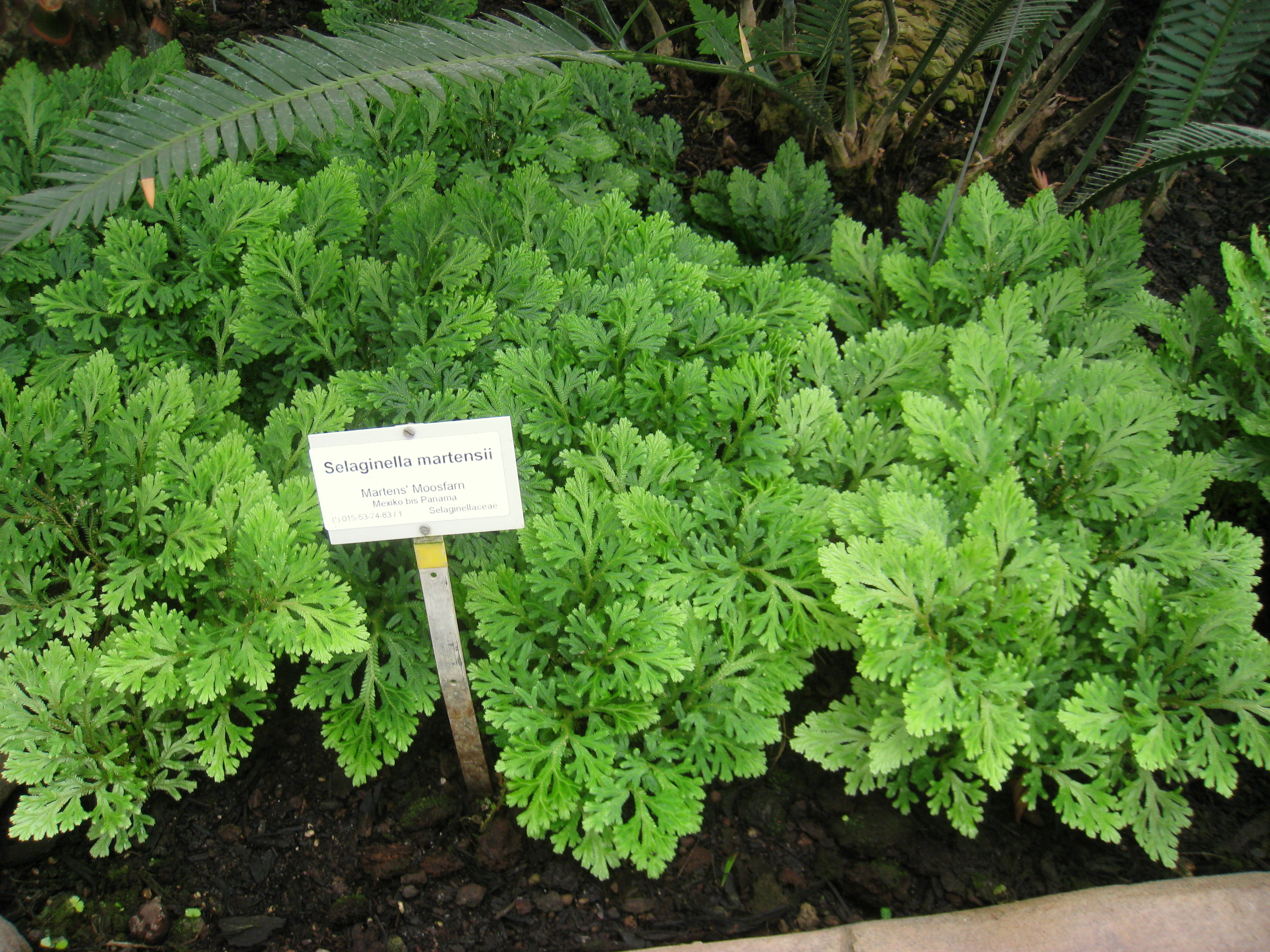

Scientific classification
- Kingdom: Plantae
- Clade: Tracheophytes
- Clade: Lycophytes
- Class: Lycopodiopsida
- Order: Selaginellales
- Family: Selaginellaceae
- Genus: Selaginella
- Species: S. martensii

Binomial name
- Selaginella martensii Spring

= Selaginella martensii =

Species of spore-bearing plant

Selaginella martensii, the variegated spikemoss or Martens's spike moss, is a lycophyte in the Selaginellaceae family. It is native to Mexico and Central America.
