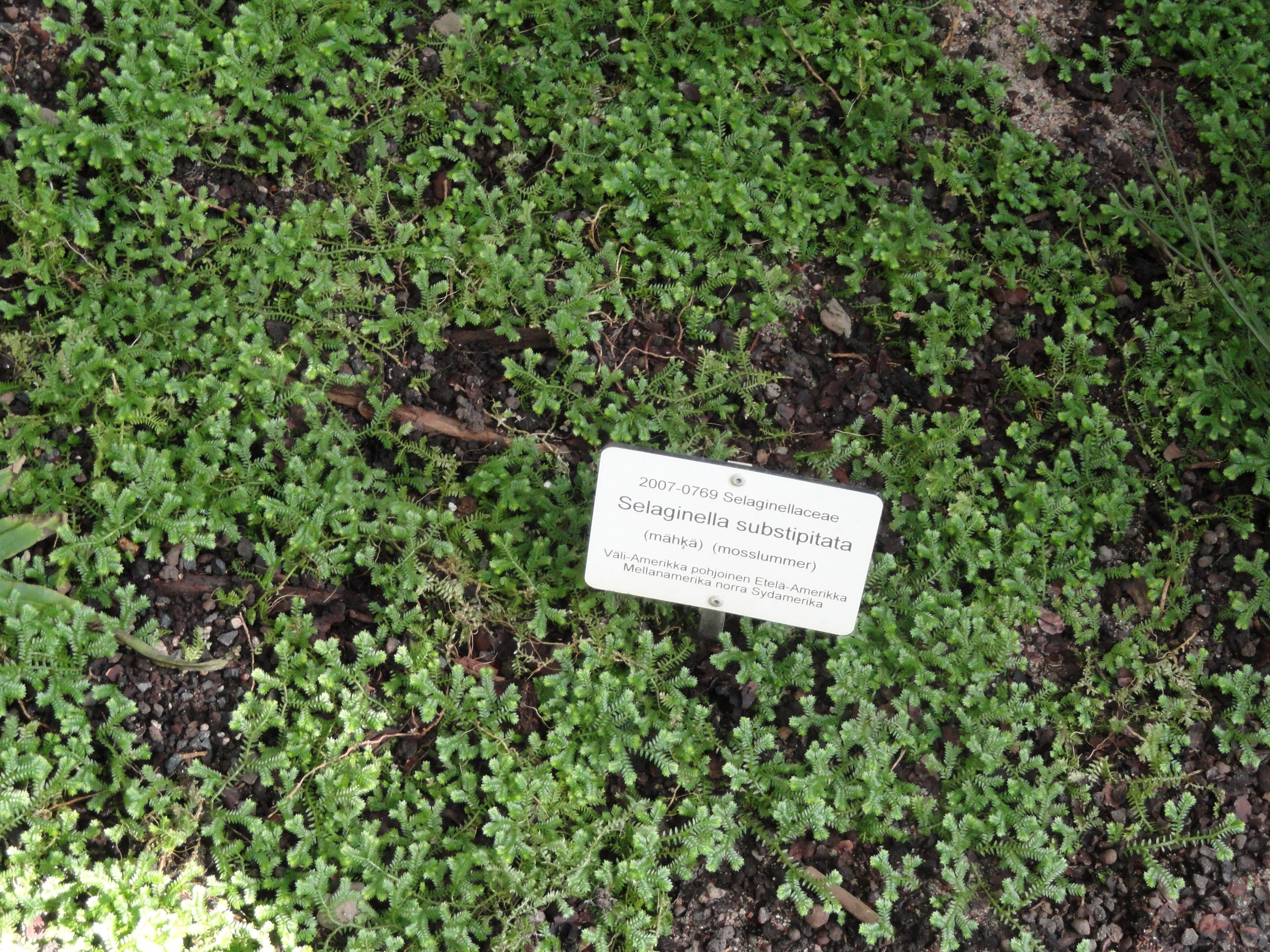

Scientific classification
- Kingdom: Plantae
- Clade: Tracheophytes
- Clade: Lycophytes
- Class: Lycopodiopsida
- Order: Selaginellales
- Family: Selaginellaceae
- Genus: Selaginella
- Species: S. substipitata

Binomial name
- Selaginella substipitata Spring

= Selaginella substipitata =

Species of spore-bearing plant

Selaginella substipitata, the stalked spikemoss, is a species of plant in the Selaginellaceae family, endemic to Caribbean islands, Colombia, and Venezuela.

== Synonyms ==
- Selaginella karsteniana A. Braun
- Selaginella rigidula Baker
