= Selaginella asprella =

Conservation status
- Apparently Secure (NatureServe)

Scientific classification
- Kingdom: Plantae
- Clade: Tracheophytes
- Clade: Lycophytes
- Class: Lycopodiopsida
- Order: Selaginellales
- Family: Selaginellaceae
- Genus: Selaginella
- Species: S. asprella

Binomial name
- Selaginella asprella Maxon

Species of spore-bearing plant

Selaginella asprella is a species of spikemoss known by the common name bluish spikemoss. It is native to California and Baja California, where it has a disjunct distribution, occurring in the Klamath Mountains and mountain ranges several hundred miles to the south. It grows in rocky mountainous habitat, on cliffs of limestone rock substrate, and on forest ridges. This lycophyte grows in flat mats with many short, forking stems twisted together. The stems fragment easily, especially as they dry. The lance-shaped green leaves are up to 5 or 6 millimeters long, including the soft bristles at their tips. The leaves are alike in shape and borne in squarish whorls of four about the stem. They are flattened to the stem.
