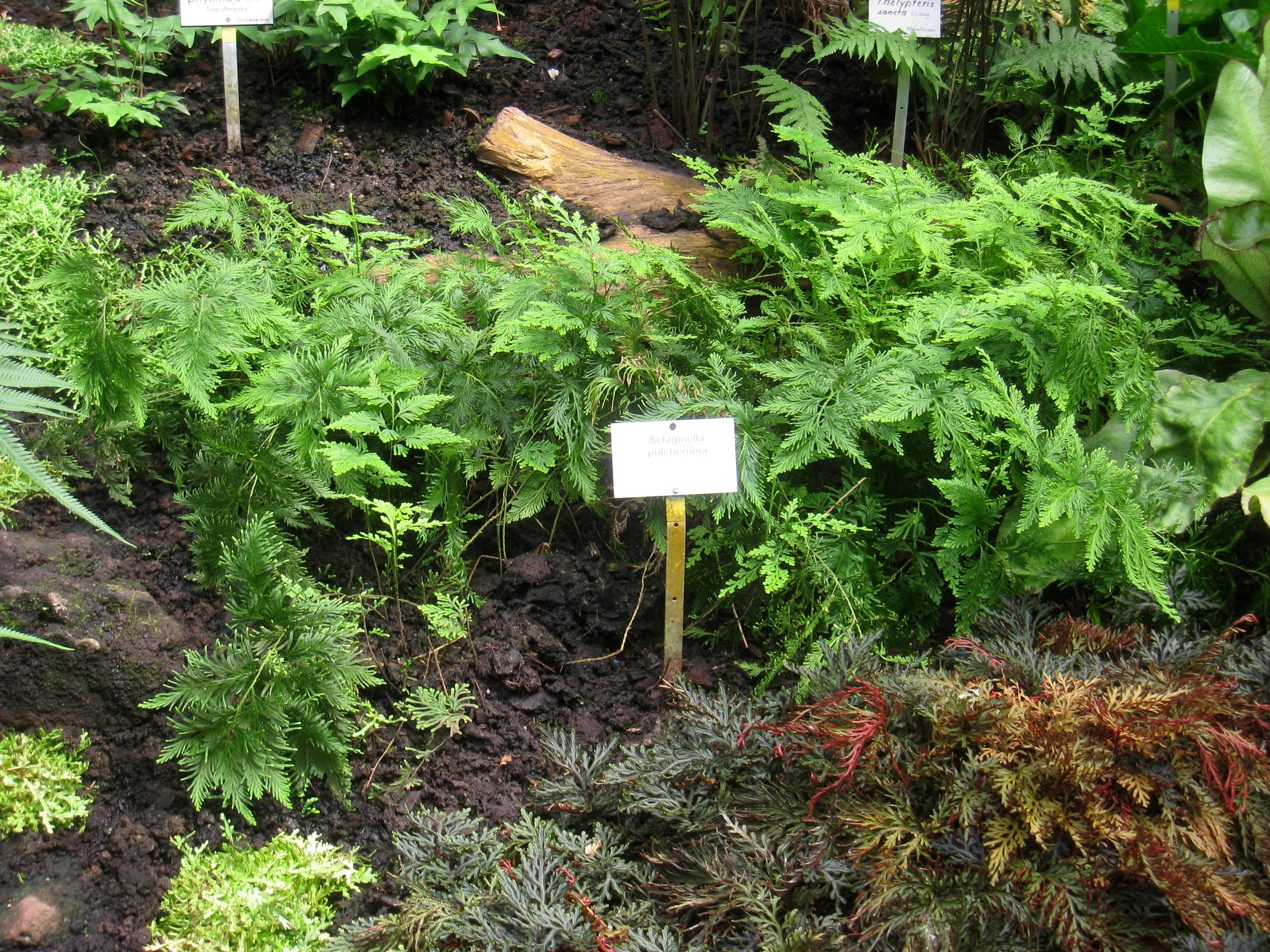

Scientific classification
- Kingdom: Plantae
- Clade: Tracheophytes
- Clade: Lycophytes
- Class: Lycopodiopsida
- Order: Selaginellales
- Family: Selaginellaceae
- Genus: Selaginella
- Species: S. pulcherrima

Binomial name
- Selaginella pulcherrima Liebm.

= Selaginella pulcherrima =

Species of spore-bearing plant

Selaginella pulcherrima is a species of plant in the family Selaginellaceae.
