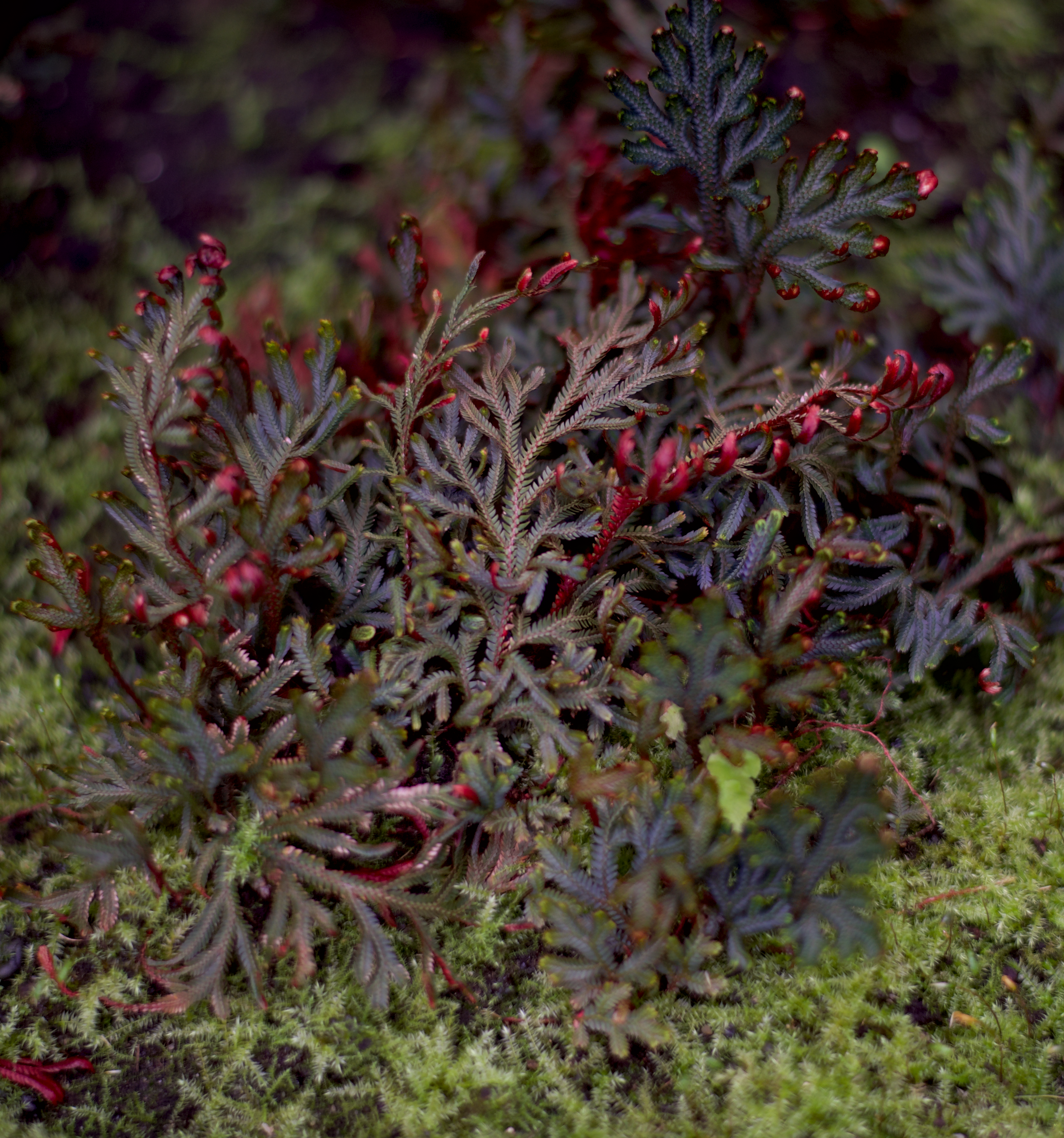

Scientific classification
- Kingdom: Plantae
- Clade: Tracheophytes
- Clade: Lycophytes
- Class: Lycopodiopsida
- Order: Selaginellales
- Family: Selaginellaceae
- Genus: Selaginella
- Species: S. erythropus

Binomial name
- Selaginella erythropus (Mart.) Spring

Synonyms
- Lycopodium erythropus Mart.; Lycopodioides erythropus (Mart.) Kuntze; Selaginella erythropus var. minor A.Braun ex Hieron.; Selaginella erythropus var. setosa (Linden) G.Schneid.; Selaginella pitcheriana W.Watson; Selaginella setosa Linden

= Selaginella erythropus =

Species of spore-bearing plant

Selaginella erythropus is a species of spike moss in the family Selaginellaceae. It is native to Central and tropical South America, and may be native or introduced in the West Indies. It has been introduced to Tanzania. It grows up to 30–40 cm (12–16 in) in height, and the upper surface of the fronds is green and the underside is a bright, ruby red color. It likes plentiful water and humidity and enjoys temperatures of 10–24 °C (50–75 °F).
