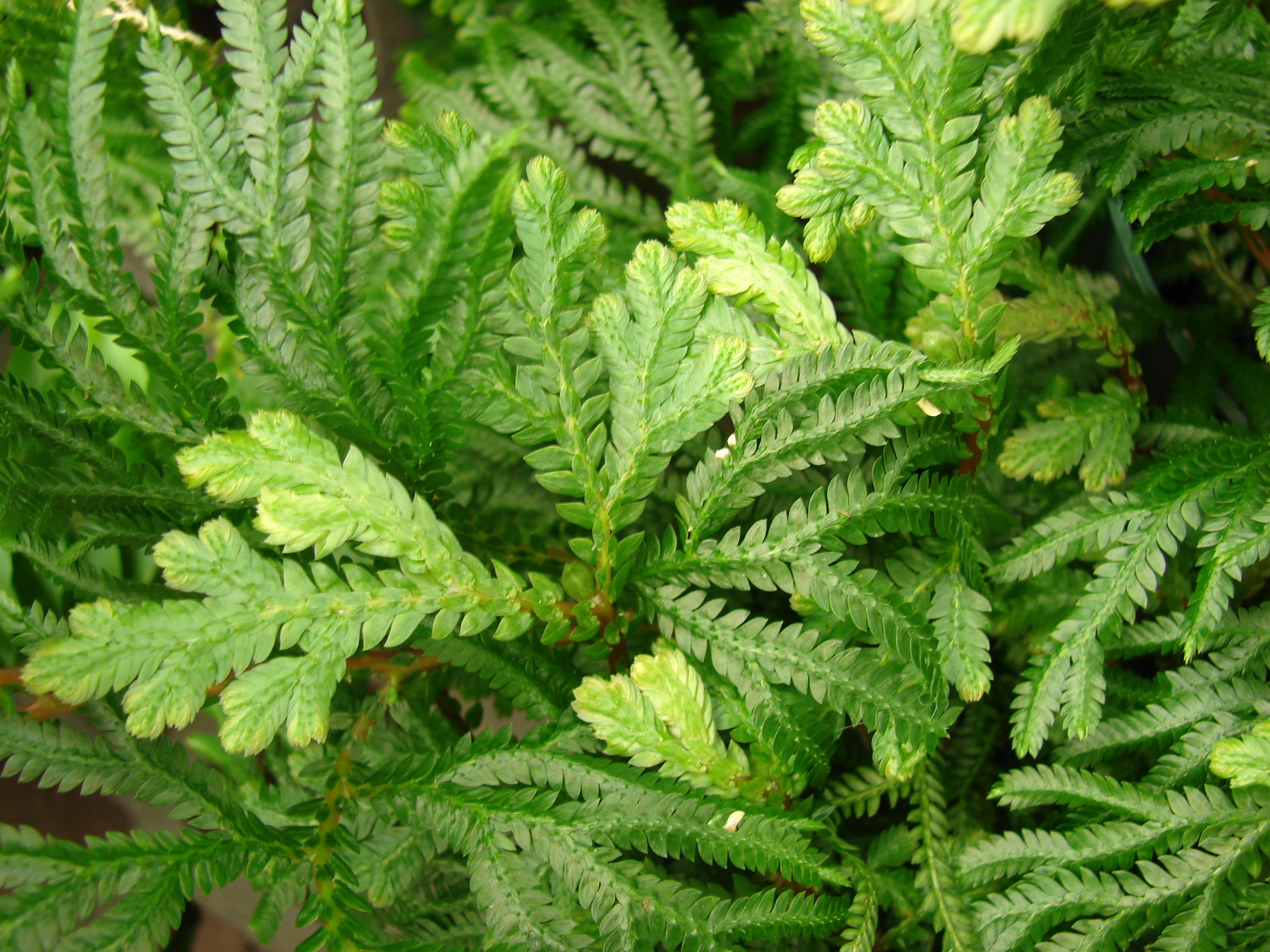

Scientific classification
- Kingdom: Plantae
- Clade: Tracheophytes
- Clade: Lycophytes
- Class: Lycopodiopsida
- Order: Selaginellales
- Family: Selaginellaceae
- Genus: Selaginella
- Species: S. plana

Binomial name
- Selaginella plana (Desv. ex Poir.) Hieron.

= Selaginella plana =

Asian spikemoss

Species of spore-bearing plant

Selaginella plana, commonly known as the Asian spikemoss, is a lycophyte native to tropical Asia.

== Distribution ==
Selaginella plana occurs in tropical regions of Asia, including India, Indochina, and the Malay Archipelago. Native populations are also present in Tanzania. The species was introduced to Puerto Rico and Cuba.
