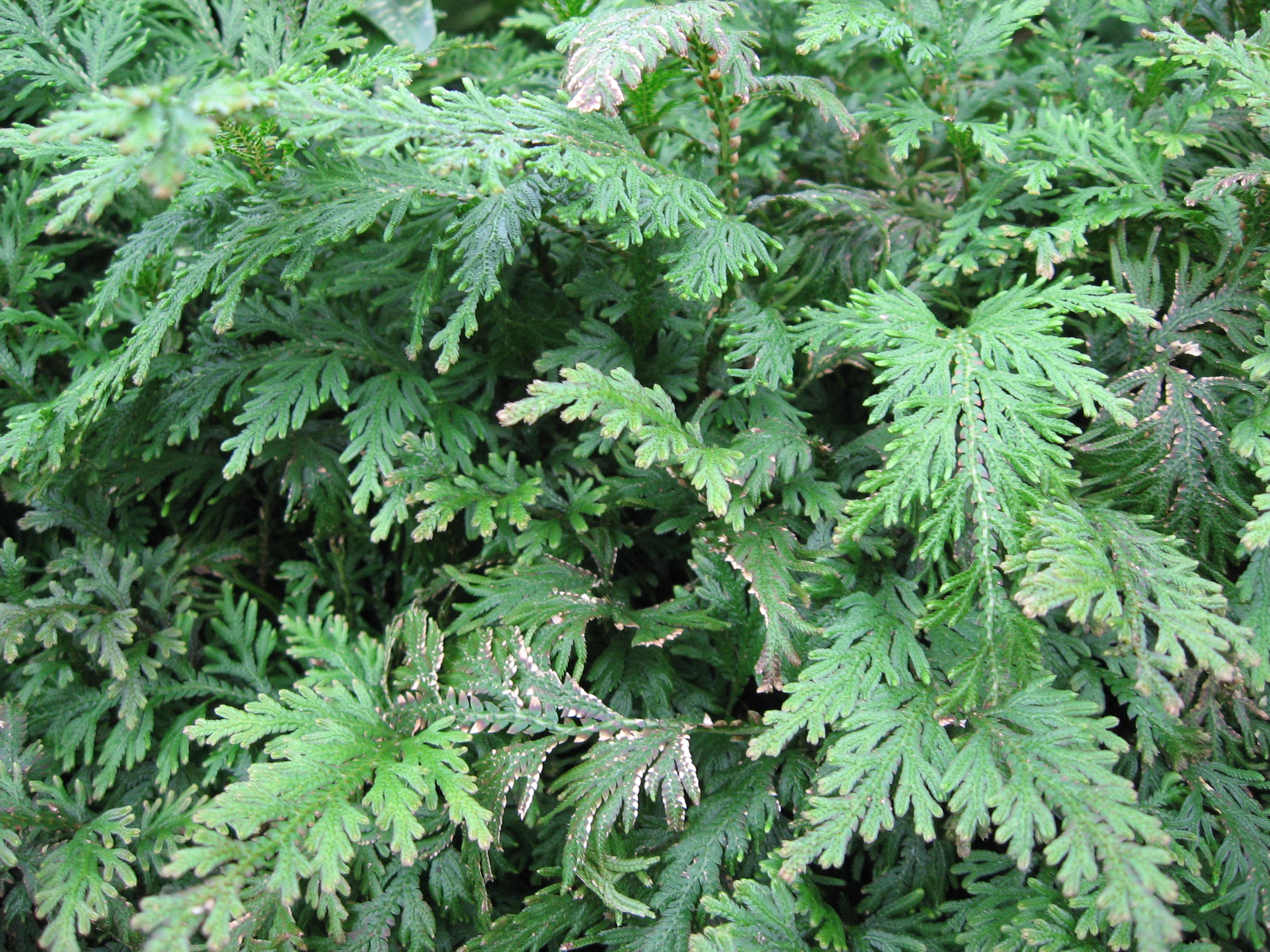

Scientific classification
- Kingdom: Plantae
- Clade: Tracheophytes
- Clade: Lycophytes
- Class: Lycopodiopsida
- Order: Selaginellales
- Family: Selaginellaceae
- Genus: Selaginella
- Species: S. biformis

Binomial name
- Selaginella biformis A.Braun ex Kuhn

Synonyms
- Selaginella flagellifera W.Bull

= Selaginella biformis =

Species of plant in the spikemoss family

Selaginella biformis is a species of plant in the family Selaginellaceae. It is native to Bangladesh, Borneo, Cambodia, China, Eastern Himalaya, India, Java, Laos, the Lesser Sunda Islands, Myanmar, New Guinea, the Nicobar Islands, the Philippines, the Ryukyu Islands, Sulawesi, Sumatra, Thailand, and Vietnam.

== Sources ==
- gourav gowda c r n, (2008). Taxonomy of Selaginella: a study of characters, techniques, and classification in the Hong Kong species. Botanical Journal of the Linnean Society, Volume 98 Issue 4, Pages 277 - 302.
