= Selaginella arizonica =

Scientific classification
- Kingdom: Plantae
- Clade: Tracheophytes
- Clade: Lycophytes
- Class: Lycopodiopsida
- Order: Selaginellales
- Family: Selaginellaceae
- Genus: Selaginella
- Species: S. arizonica

Binomial name
- Selaginella arizonica Maxon

Species of plant native to Arizona, US

Selaginella arizonica, commonly known as Arizona spikemoss, is a species of spikemoss in the family Selaginellaceae. It is native to Arizona, US, where it can be found in rock crevices, or on gravel, sandstone, igneous, or limestone substrates.

== Description ==
Selaginella arizonica plants are prostrate, freely branching, and matted. Their stems range from 5 to 20 cm (2.0 to 7.9 in) in length with short ultimate branches and tips that turn slightly upwards. When these plants are young, they are bright green. However, as they age, they become greyer in color.
