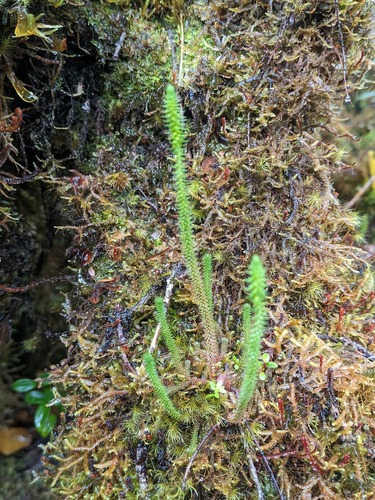

Conservation status
- Critically Imperiled (NatureServe)

Scientific classification
- Kingdom: Plantae
- Clade: Embryophytes
- Clade: Tracheophytes
- Clade: Lycophytes
- Class: Lycopodiopsida
- Order: Selaginellales
- Family: Selaginellaceae
- Genus: Selaginella
- Species: S. deflexa

Binomial name
- Selaginella deflexa Brack.

Synonyms
- Lycopodioides deflexa (Brack.) Kuntze

= Selaginella deflexa =

Species of plant

Selaginella deflexa, commonly known as deflexed spikemoss, is a non-flowering species of plant in the spikemoss genus Selaginella and is in the subgenus of the same name. It is closely related to Selaginella selaginoides which is the only other member in its subgenus. This subgenus is unique in that it lacks the rhizophores typically seen along the stems of other Selaginella species. It is endemic to Hawaii and grows primarily in the wet tropical biome. This plant gets its name from its reflexed leaves which point outwards.

== Description ==
Selaginella deflexa is a small vascular plant that grows to 10–25 cm (4–10 in) in height. It has needle-like leaves that bend downwards and exhibit a lanceolate or ovate-lanceolate shape. Selaginella deflexa additionally have spiky, helical strobili in which the sporangia-bearing sporophylls are embedded. The plant tends to have a yellowish-green color, and its roots can be found attached to a swollen region of a long hypocotyl base.

== Reproduction ==
Selaginella deflexa reproduces via spores. Selaginella deflexa is heterosporous and contains both megasporangia and microsporangia on each plant body. The sporangia are arranged within the helical strobili along the branching points of the plant. The megasporangium has three lobes and can easily be identified along the reproductive stalks of the plant due to its globular appearance. Within each megasporangium there are four megaspores arranged tetrahedrally. Selaginella deflexa megaspores are covered by irregularly arranged spines between 70-90 micrometers high that join to form larger, composite spines. The microsporangia of S. deflexa plants are smooth and contain hundreds of microspores per structure.

== Distribution and habitat ==
Selaginella deflexa is endemic to Hawai'i. Excluding Lānaʻi, S. deflexa is found across all of the Hawaiian Islands; however, its appearance on Oʻahu is rare. It typically grows within wetland bogs surrounded by moss, located between 1,050–1,500 m (3,440–4,920 ft) above sea level.
