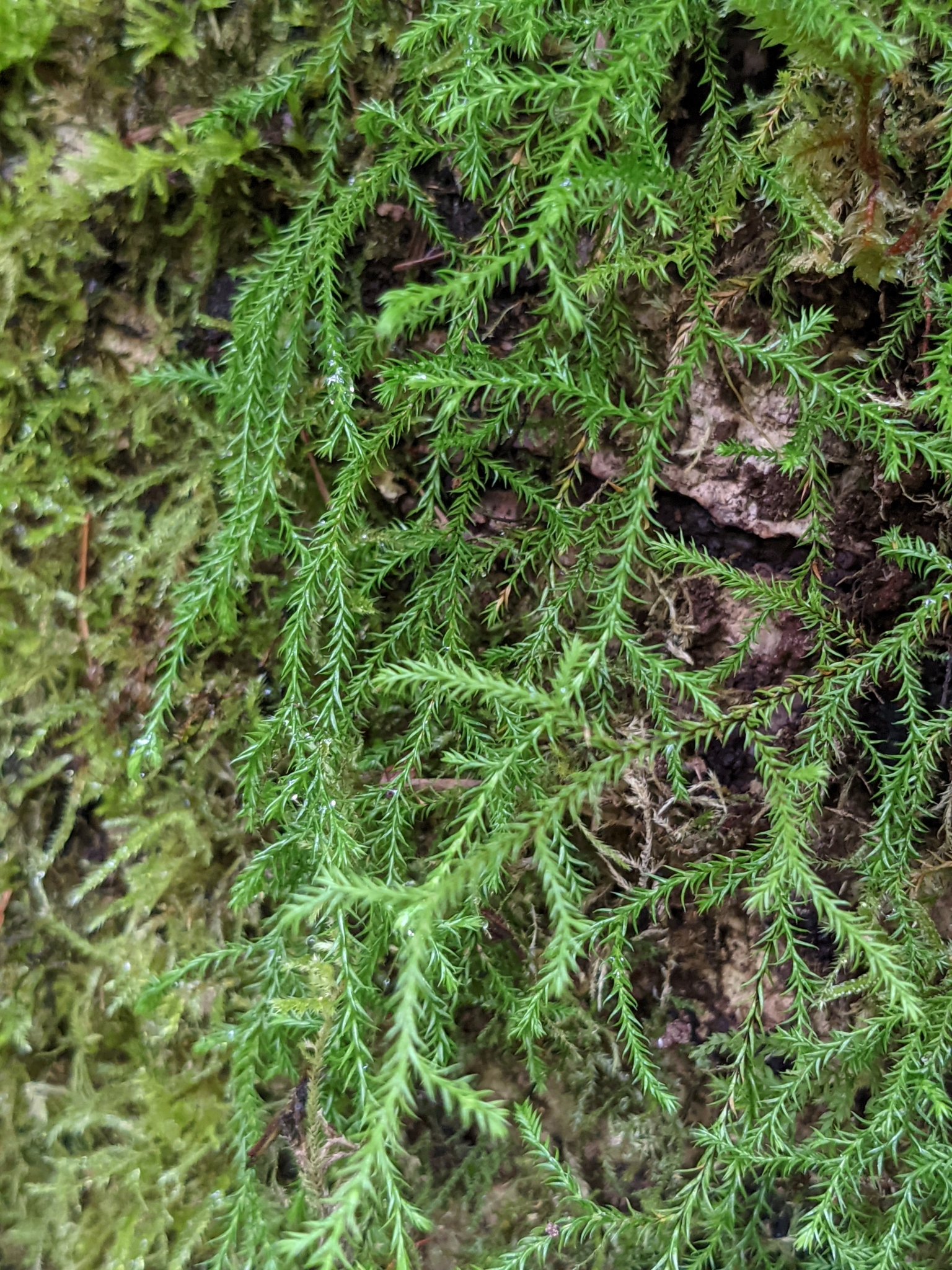

Conservation status
- Apparently Secure (NatureServe)

Scientific classification
- Kingdom: Plantae
- Clade: Tracheophytes
- Clade: Lycophytes
- Class: Lycopodiopsida
- Order: Selaginellales
- Family: Selaginellaceae
- Genus: Selaginella
- Species: S. oregana

Binomial name
- Selaginella oregana D.C.Eaton

= Selaginella oregana =

Species of spore-bearing plant

Selaginella oregana is a species of spikemoss known by the common name Oregon spikemoss. It is native to the Pacific Coast of western North America, where it can be found from British Columbia to northern California. It grows in mossy, shady coastal forests. It is often epiphytic, growing attached to tree branches, its stems hanging in sheets of green, mosslike streamers. Trees commonly occupied by the spikemoss include bigleaf maple (Acer macrophyllum), black cottonwood (Populus trichocarpa), and red alder (Alnus rubra). It also grows on the ground and on rocks in carpetlike mats. This lycophyte has creeping or hanging stems up to about 60 centimeters long, usually with forking branches. They curl as they dry. The stems are radially symmetric, with spirals of lance-shaped leaves each measuring 2 or 3 millimeters in length and tipped with a tiny, rigid bristle. The strobili containing the reproductive structures are up to 6 centimeters long and often occur in pairs.
