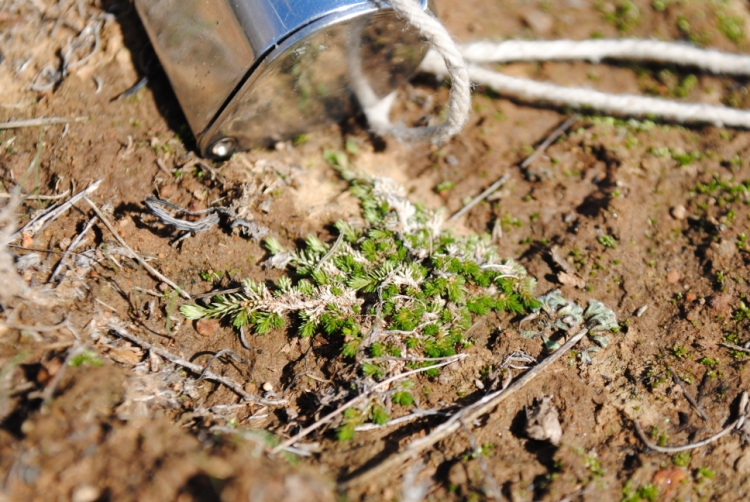

Conservation status
- Vulnerable (NatureServe)

Scientific classification
- Kingdom: Plantae
- Clade: Tracheophytes
- Clade: Lycophytes
- Class: Lycopodiopsida
- Order: Selaginellales
- Family: Selaginellaceae
- Genus: Selaginella
- Species: S. cinerascens

Binomial name
- Selaginella cinerascens A.A.Eaton

Synonyms
- Bryodesma cinerascens (A.A.Eaton) Soják; Selaginella bryoides Underw.

= Selaginella cinerascens =

Species of spore-bearing plant

Selaginella cinerascens is a species of spikemoss known by the common names mesa spikemoss, gray spikemoss, and ashy spikemoss. It is native to Baja California as well as some locations just north of the border in San Diego County, California. It grows in dry habitat, often on clay soil, both in open areas and in the shade of larger plants. This lycophyte forms mats of spreading, forking stems up to 18 centimeters long. The plant is often gray or brown in color, forming a dull-colored carpet on the substrate. The linear or lance-shaped leaves are 1 to 3 millimeters long and lack bristles at the tips. The leaves are green when new or moist. They are flattened to the stem or stick out just a little. The strobili borne at the leaf bases are yellow in color and no more than 4 to 5 millimeters long.
