= Selaginella bifida =

Conservation status
- Critically Imperiled (NatureServe)

Scientific classification
- Kingdom: Plantae
- Clade: Embryophytes
- Clade: Tracheophytes
- Clade: Lycophytes
- Class: Lycopodiopsida
- Order: Selaginellales
- Family: Selaginellaceae
- Genus: Selaginella
- Species: S. bifida

Binomial name
- Selaginella bifida Delmail

Species of spore-bearing plant

Selaginella bifida is a lycophyte native to Rodrigues Island in the Mascarene Islands. It was found firstly in 1991 on the Mont Limon at 20–150 m high and was confused with S. rodrigueziana Baker because of their strong phenotypical homologies. However, fastidious studies in 2009 highlight ciliate lateral leaf margins on several specimens and bifid microsporophyll apices during the emergence of reproductive parts, which differentiate a new taxon.
