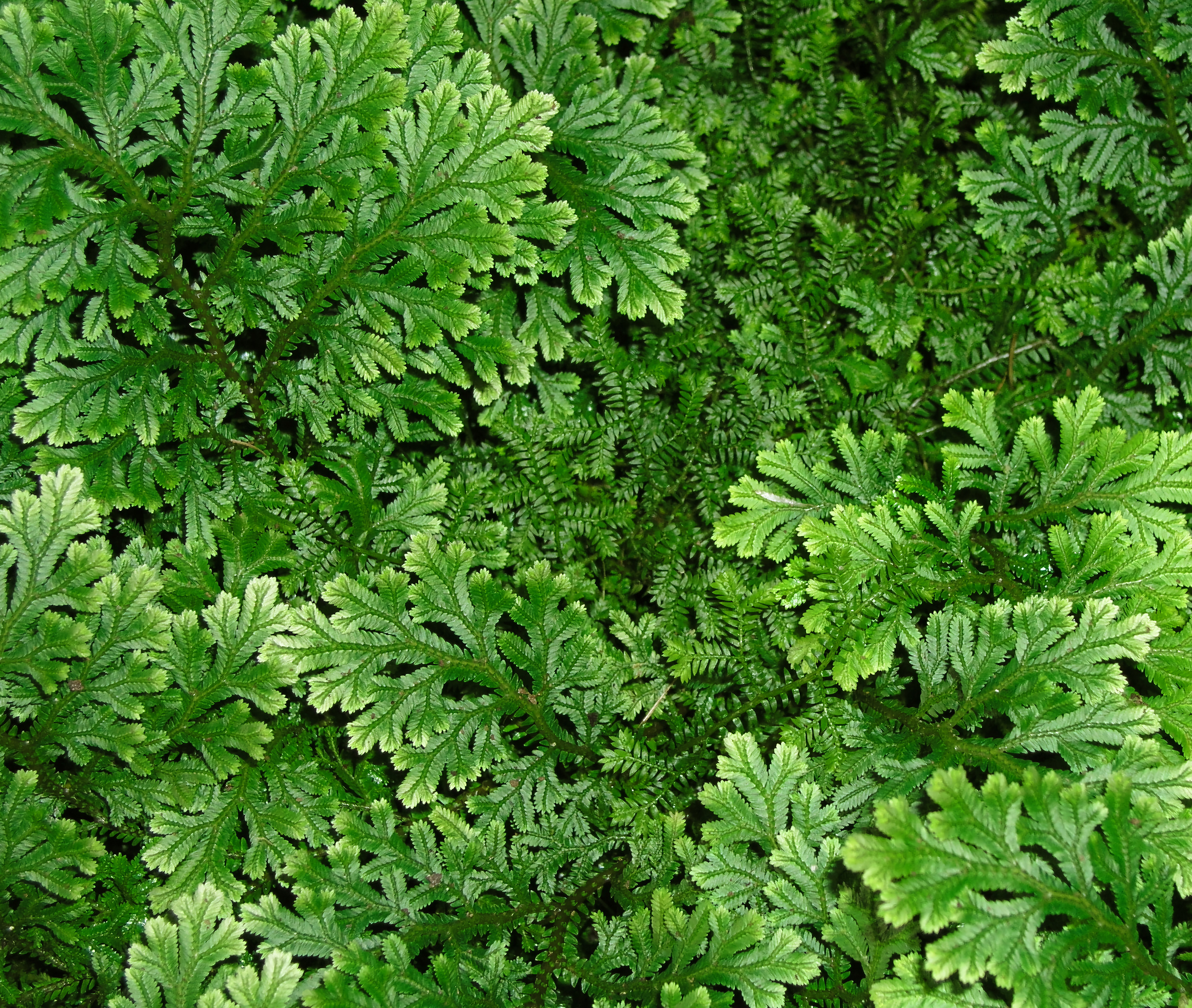

Scientific classification
- Kingdom: Plantae
- Clade: Tracheophytes
- Clade: Lycophytes
- Class: Lycopodiopsida
- Order: Selaginellales; Prantl
- Family: Selaginellaceae; Willk.
- Genus: Selaginella; P. Beauv.

Type species
- Selaginella selaginoides

Species
- See text.

Synonyms
- 24 synonyms: Afroselaginella Li Bing Zhang & X.M.Zhou; Austroselaginella Li Bing Zhang & X.M.Zhou; Boreoselaginella (Warb.) Li Bing Zhang & X.M.Zhou; Bryodesma Soják; Chuselaginella Li Bing Zhang & X.M.Zhou; Didiclis P.Beauv. ex Mirb.; Diplostachyum P.Beauv.; Ericetorum (Jermy) Li Bing Zhang & X.M.Zhou; Gymnogynum P.Beauv.; Heterophyllium Hieron. ex Borner; Hypopterygiopsis Sakurai; Korallia Li Bing Zhang & X.M.Zhou; Kungiselaginella Li Bing Zhang & X.M.Zhou; Lepidoselaginella Li Bing Zhang & X.M.Zhou; Lycopodina Bubani; Lycopodioides Boehm.; Megaloselaginella Li Bing Zhang & X.M.Zhou; Mirmau Adans.; Pulviniella (Li Bing Zhang & X.M.Zhou) Li Bing Zhang & X.M.Zhou; Selago P.Browne; Sinoselaginella Li Bing Zhang & X.M.Zhou; Stachygynandrum P.Beauv. ex Mirb.; Trispermium Hill; Valdespinoa Li Bing Zhang & X.M.Zhou

= Selaginella =

Selaginella Temporal range: Late Carboniferous–Recent

Genus of vascular plants

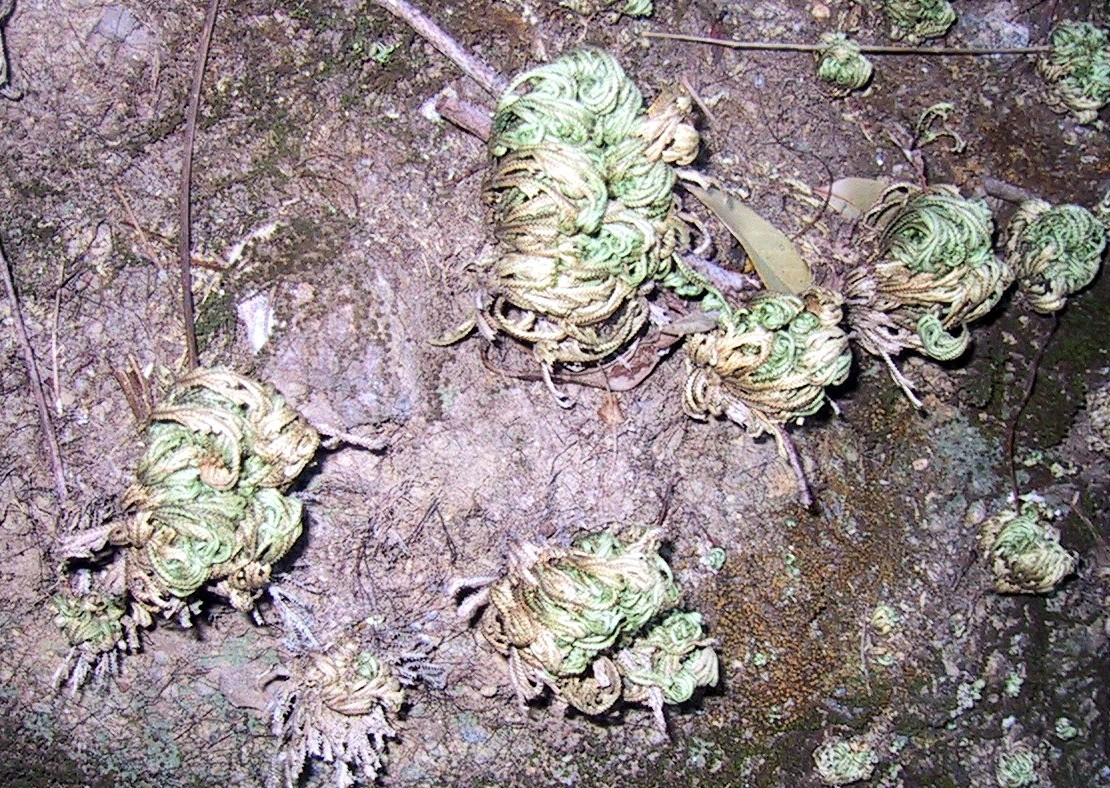
Curled up Selaginella tamariscina

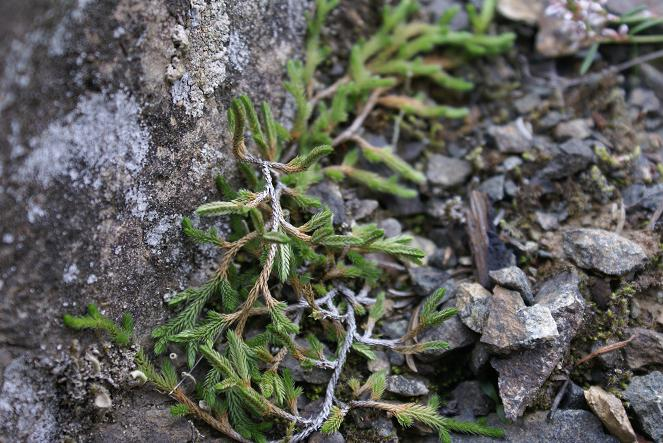
Wallace's Selaginella (Selaginella wallacei)

Selaginella, also known as spikemosses or lesser clubmosses, is a genus of lycophyte. It is usually treated as the only genus in the family Selaginellaceae, with over 750 known species.

This family is distinguished from Lycopodiaceae (the clubmosses) by having scale-leaves bearing a ligule and by having spores of two types. They are sometimes included in an informal paraphyletic group called the "fern allies". The species S. moellendorffii is an important model organism. Its genome has been sequenced by the United States Department of Energy's Joint Genome Institute. The name Selaginella was erected by Palisot de Beauvois solely for the species Selaginella selaginoides, which turns out (with the closely related Selaginella deflexa) to be a clade that is sister to all other Selaginellas, so any definitive subdivision of the species into separate genera leaves two taxa in Selaginella, with the hundreds of other species in new or resurrected genera.

Selaginella occurs mostly in the tropical regions of the world, with a handful of species to be found in the arctic-alpine zones of both hemispheres. Fossils assignable to the modern genus are known spanning over 300 million years from the Late Carboniferous to the present.

== Description ==
Selaginella species are creeping or ascendant plants with simple, scale-like leaves (microphylls) on branching stems from which roots also arise. The stems are aerial, horizontally creeping on the substratum (as in Selaginella kraussiana), sub-erect (Selaginella trachyphylla) or erect (as in Selaginella erythropus). The vascular steles are polystelic protosteles. Stem section shows the presence of more than two protosteles. Each stele is made up of diarch (having two strands of xylem) and exarch (growing outward in) xylems. The steles are connected with the cortex by means of many tube-like structures called trabeculae, which are modified endodermal cells with casparian strips on their lateral walls. The stems contain no pith.

In Selaginella, each microphyll and sporophyll has a small scale-like outgrowth called a ligule at the base of the upper surface. The plants are heterosporous with spores of two different size classes, known as megaspores and microspores. In Selaginella rupestris fertilization takes place while the megaspore is still attached to the parent plant, and is only released after the embryo has produced cotyledons and a root.

Unusual for the lycopods, which nearly always have microphylls with a single unbranched vein, the microphylls of a few Selaginella species contain a branched vascular trace.

Under dry conditions, some species of Selaginella can survive dehydration. In this state, they may roll up into brown balls and be uprooted, but can rehydrate under moist conditions, become green again and resume growth. This phenomenon is known as poikilohydry, and poikilohydric plants such as Selaginella bryopteris are sometimes referred to as resurrection plants.

There is no evidence of whole genome duplication in Selaginella's evolutionary history. Instead they have gone through tandem gene duplications, which is particularly noticeable in genes relevant for desiccation tolerance.

Their chloroplasts are missing about two-thirds of their plastidial tRNA genes, which are instead found in the genome of the nucleus. The genus is unique among vascular plants in having species with monoplastidic cells, single giant chloroplasts, located mostly in their dorsal epidermal cells, but also in the upper mesophyll of some species. This appears to be a derived traits and an adaptation to low-light conditions, having originated at least twice. Cells with multiplastidic chloroplasts, more than ten chloroplasts per cell, are considered most basal, and are found in species exposed to more light. Oligoplastidic cells, cells with 3 to ten chloroplasts, are more adated to weaker light, and the monoplastidic species being the most shade-loving forms. It is estimated that 70% of Selaginella species are monoplastidic. These receive just 0.4~2.1% of full sunlight, while species with multiple chloroplasts live in open places where they on average receive more than 40.5% of full sunlight.

== Taxonomy ==
Some scientists still place the Selaginellales in the class Lycopodiopsida (often misconstructed as "Lycopsida"). Some modern authors recognize three generic divisions of Selaginella: Selaginella, Bryodesma Sojak 1992, and Lycopodioides Boehm 1760. Lycopodioides would include the North American species S. apoda and S. eclipes, while Bryodesma would include S. rupestris (as Bryodesma rupestre). Stachygynandrum is also sometimes used to include the bulk of species.

The first major attempt to define and subdivide the group was by Palisot de Beauvois in 1803–1805. He established the genus Selaginella as a monotypic genus, and placed the bulk of species in Stachygynandrum. Gymnogynum was another monotypic genus, but that name is superseded by his own earlier name of Didiclis. This turns out, today, to be a group of around 45–50 species also known as the Articulatae, since his genus Didiclis/Gymnogynum was based on Selaginella plumosa. He also described the genus Diplostachyum to include a group of species similar to Selaginella apoda. Spring inflated the genus Selaginella to hold all selaginelloid species four decades later.

Phylogenetic studies by Korall & Kenrick determined that the Euselaginella group, comprising solely the type species, Selaginella selaginoides and a closely related Hawaiian species, Selaginella deflexa, is a basal and anciently diverging sister to all other Selaginella species. Beyond this, their study split the remainder of species into two broad groups, one including the Bryodesma species, the Articulatae, section Ericetorum Jermy and others, and the other centered on the broad Stachygynandrum group.

In 2023, Zhou & Zhang suggested that the genus should be broken up into 19 different genera.

Walton & Aston 1938	Weststrand & Korall 2016
subgenus: Euselaginella; group: selaginoides; group: pygmaea; group: uliginosa (Ericetorum); group: rupestris (Tetragonostachys or Bryodesma); subgenus: Stachygynandrum; series: Decumbentes; series: Ascendentes; series: Sarmentosae; series: Caulescentes; series: Circinatae; series: Articulatae; subgenus: Homostachys; subgenus: Heterostachys	subgenus: Selaginella; clade: "Rhizophoric clade"; clade A; subgenus Rupestrae [Bryodesma Sojak or Tetragonostachys Jermy, S. section Homeophyllae]; subgenus Lepidophyllae [S. section Lepidophyllae]; subgenus Gymnogynum [S. section Articulatae]; subgenus Exaltatae [incl. S. section Megalosporum, S. section Myosurus]; subgenus Ericetorum [S. section Lyallia]; clade B; subgenus Stachygynandrum [incl. S. (Boreoselaginella), S. (Pulviniella), S. (Heterostachys)]

=== Zhang & Zhou, 2015 classification ===
- subgenus: Selaginella Type: S. selaginoides (L.) P.Beauv. ex Mart. & Schrank
- subgenus: Boreoselaginella Type: S. sanguinolenta (L.) Spring
- subgenus: Ericetorum Type: S. uliginosa (Labill.) Spring
  - section: Lyallia Type: S. uliginosa (Labill.) Spring
  - section: Myosurus Type: S. myosurus Alston
  - section: Megalosporarum Type: S. exaltata (Kunze) Spring
  - section: Articulatae Type: S. kraussiana (Kunze) A.Braun
  - section: Homoeophyllae Type: S. rupestris (L.) Spring (=Bryodesma Sojak or Tetragonostachys Jermy)
  - section: Lepidophyllae Type: S. lepidophylla (Hook. & Grev.) Spring
- subgenus: Pulviniella Type: S. pulvinata (Hook. & Grev.) Maxim
- subgenus: Heterostachys Type: S. heterostachys Baker
  - section: Oligomacrosporangiatae Type: Selaginella uncinata (Desv. ex Poir.) Spring
  - section: Auriculatae Type: S. douglasii (Hook. & Grev.) Spring
  - section: Homostachys Type: : S. helvetica (L.) Link
  - section: Tetragonostachyae Type: S. proniflora (L.) Baker
  - section: Heterostachys Type: S. brachystachya (Hook. & Grev.) Spring
- subgenus: Stachygynandrum Type: S. flabellata (L.) Spring
  - section: Plagiophyllae Type: S. biformis A.Braun ex Kuhn
  - section: Circinatae Type: S. involvens (Sw.) Spring
  - section: Heterophyllae Type: S. flexuosa Spring
  - section: Austroamericanae Type: S. hartwegiana Spring
  - section: Pallescentes Type: S. pallescens (C.Presl) Spring
  - section: Proceres Type: S. oaxacana Spring
  - section: Ascendentes Type: S. alopecuroides Baker

Zhang & Zhou 2015

- Selaginella
  - subgenus Selaginella
  - - subgenus Boreoselaginella
    - - - subgenus Gymnogynum
          - - - section Megalosporum
              - - section Myosurus
                - section Lyallia
            - section Articulatae
          - - section Lepidophyllae
            - section Homeophyllae
      - - subgenus Pulviniella
        - - subgenus Heterostachys
            - - section Tetragonostachyae
              - section Heterostachys
            - - - section Auriculatae
                - section Homostachys
              - section Oligomacrosporangiatae
                - S. braunii subclade
                - - S. willdenowii subclade
                  - - S. pennata subclade
                    - - S. pervillei subclade
                      - - S. siamensis subclade
                        - S. delicatula subclade
          - subgenus Stachygynandrum
            - section Plagiophyllae
            - - section Circinatae
              - - section Ascendentes
                - - - section Proceres
                    - section Pallescentes
                  - - section Austroamericanae
                    - section Heterophyllae

Zhou & Zhang 2023

- Selaginellaceae
  - - Selaginoidoideae
      Selaginoides Séguier 1754
  - - - Boreoselaginelloideae
        Boreoselaginella (Warburg 1900) Zhang & Zhou 2023
    - - - Gymnogynoideae
          - - Afroselaginella Zhang & Zhou 2023
            - Megaloselaginella Zhang & Zhou 2023
          - - - Ericetorum (Jermy 1986) Zhang & Zhou 2023
              - Gymnogynum Palisot de Beauvois 1804
            - - Lepidoselaginella Zhang & Zhou 2023
              - Bryodesma Soják 1992
      - - - Pulvinielloideae
            Pulviniella (Zhang & Zhou 2015) Zhang & Zhou 2023
          - Sinoselaginelloideae
            - Sinoselaginella Zhang & Zhou 2023
            - - Austroselaginella Zhang & Zhou 2023
              - Korallia Zhang & Zhou 2023
        - - Lycopodioidoideae
            - - - Valdespinoa Zhang & Zhou 2023
                - Lycopodioides Boehm. 1760 ex Kuntze 1891
              - Didiclis Palisot de Beauvois ex Mirb. 1802
            - Hypopterygiopsis Sakurai 1943
          - Selaginelloideae
            - Chuselaginella Zhang & Zhou 2023
            - - Kungiselaginella Zhang & Zhou 2023
              - - Selaginella
                  - - - section Proceres Spring 1850
                      - section Pallescentes Zhang & Zhou 2015
                    - section Austroamericanae Zhang & Zhou 2015
                  - section Heterophyllae Spring 1840

=== Species ===
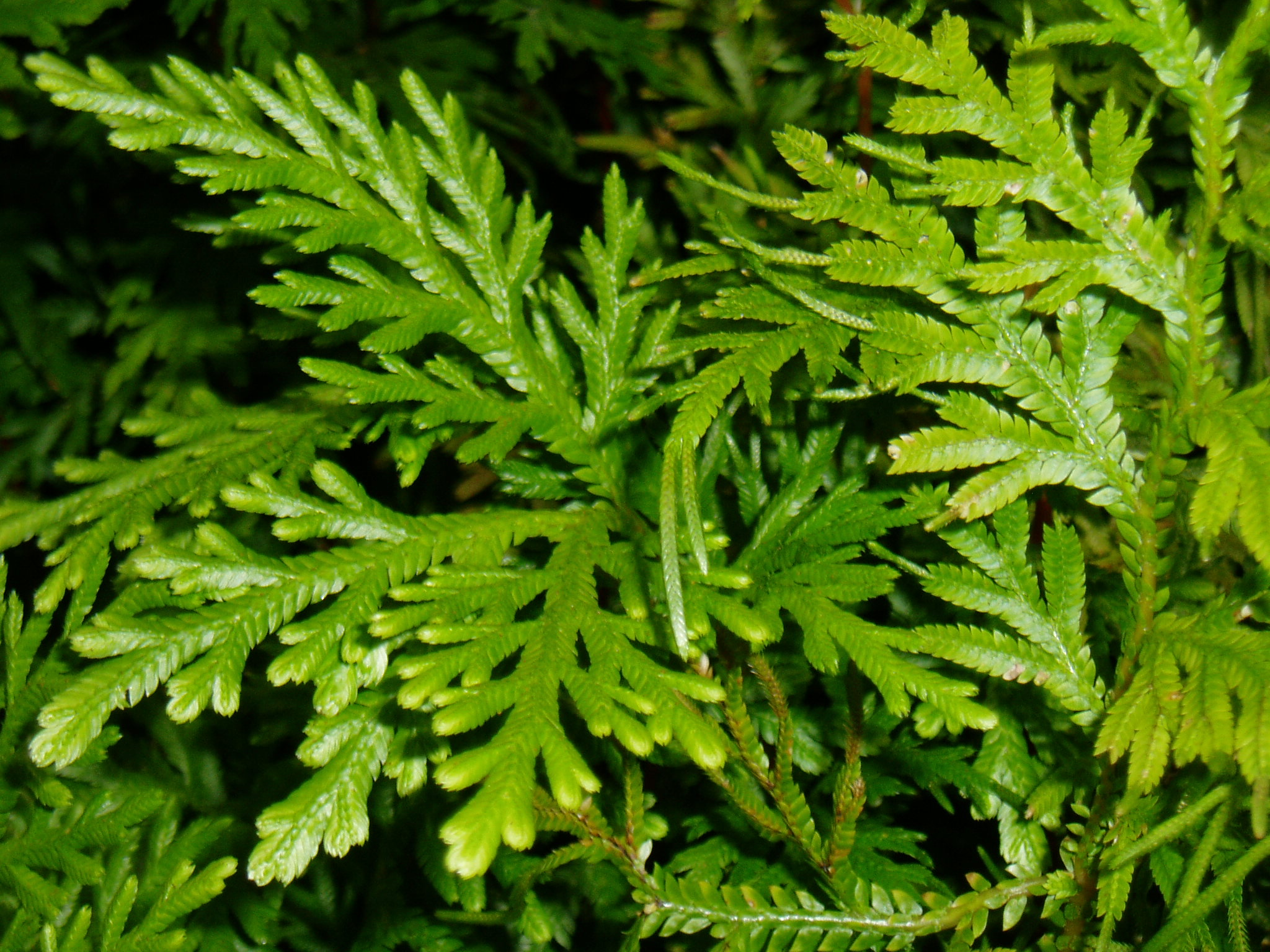
Selaginella canaliculata

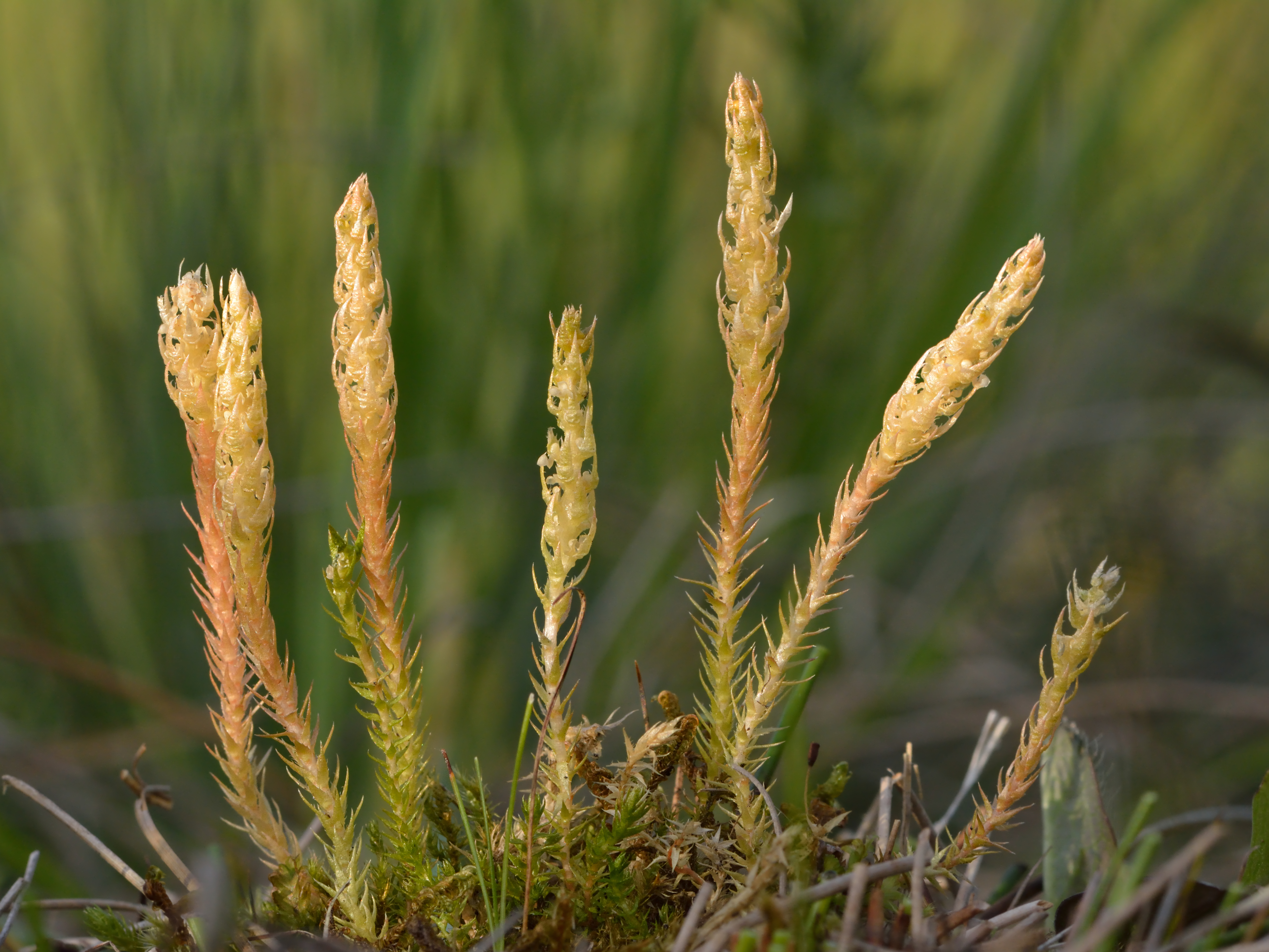
Selaginella selaginoides

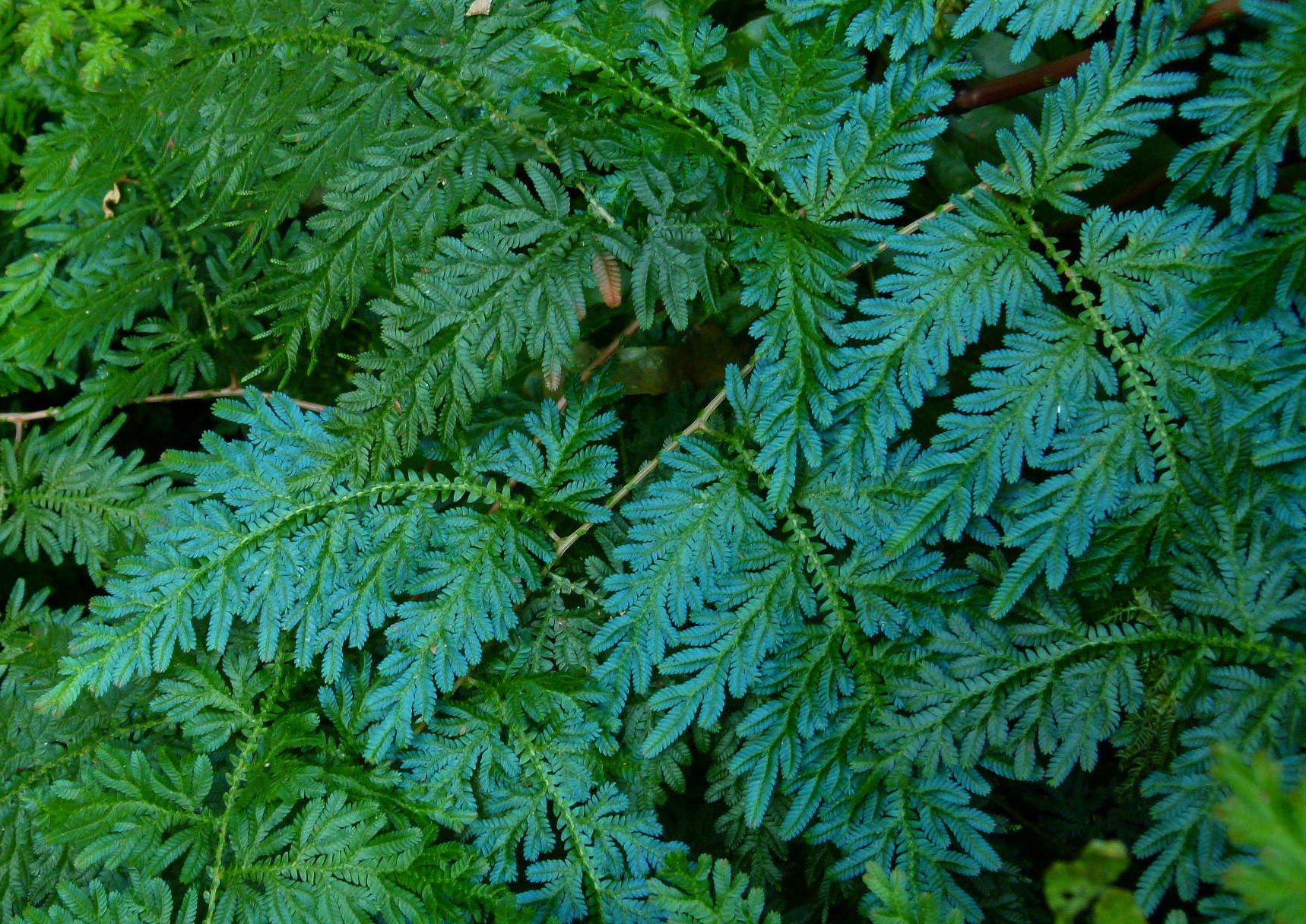
Selaginella willdenowii is known for its iridescent colours

There are about 750 known species of Selaginella. They show a wide range of characters; the genus is overdue for a revision which might include subdivision into several genera. Species of spikemoss include:

- Selaginella apoda – meadow spikemoss; eastern North America
- Selaginella arizonica Maxon – west Texas to Arizona and Sonora, Mexico
- Selaginella asprella
- Selaginella bifida – Rodrigues Island
- Selaginella biformis
- Selaginella bigelovii
- Selaginella braunii – Braun's spikemoss; China
- Selaginella bryopteris – sanjeevani; India
- Selaginella canaliculata – clubmoss; southeast Asia, Maluku Islands
- Selaginella carinata
- Selaginella cinerascens
- Selaginella densa – lesser spikemoss; western North America
- Selaginella denticulata
- Selaginella eclipes – hidden spikemoss; eastern North America
- Selaginella elmeri
- Selaginella eremophila Maxon
- Selaginella erythropus
- Selaginella galotteii
- Selaginella gigantea – From Venezuela.
- Selaginella hansenii
- Selaginella kraussiana – Krauss's spikemoss; Africa, Azores
- Selaginella lepidophylla – resurrection plant, dinosaur plant, and flower of stone; Chihuahuan Desert, North America
- Selaginella martensii – variegated spikemoss
- Selaginella moellendorffii
- Selaginella oregana
- Selaginella plana – Asian spikemoss; tropical Asia
- Selaginella poulteri
- Selaginella pulcherrima
- Selaginella rupestris – rock spikemoss, festoon pine, and northern Selaginella (eastern North America)
- Selaginella rupincola Underw. – west Texas to Arizona and Sonora, Mexico
- Selaginella selaginoides – lesser clubmoss; north temperate Europe, Asia and North America)
- Selaginella sericea A.Braun – Ecuador
- Selaginella serpens
- Selaginella sibirica
- Selaginella stellata – starry spikemoss; Mexico, Central America
- Selaginella substipitata
- Selaginella tamariscina
- Selaginella tortipila
- Selaginella uliginosa – Australia
- Selaginella umbrosa
- Selaginella uncinata – peacock moss, peacock spikemoss, blue spikemoss
- Selaginella underwoodii Hieron. – west Texas to Wyoming and west into Arizona
- Selaginella wallacei
- Selaginella watsonii
- Selaginella willdenowii – Willdenow's spikemoss, peacock fern; southeast Asia

A few species of Selaginella are desert plants known as "resurrection plants", because they curl up in a tight, brown or reddish ball during dry times, and uncurl and turn green in the presence of moisture. Other species are tropical forest plants that appear at first glance to be ferns.

== Cultivation ==
A number of Selaginella species are popular plants for cultivation, mostly tropical species. Some of the species popularly cultivated and actively available commercially include:

- S. kraussiana: golden clubmoss
- S. martensii: frosty fern
- S. moellendorffii: gemmiferous spikemoss
- S. erythropus: red selaginella or ruby-red spikemoss
- S. uncinata: peacock moss
- S. lepidophylla: resurrection plant
- S. braunii: arborvitae fern

== Gallery ==
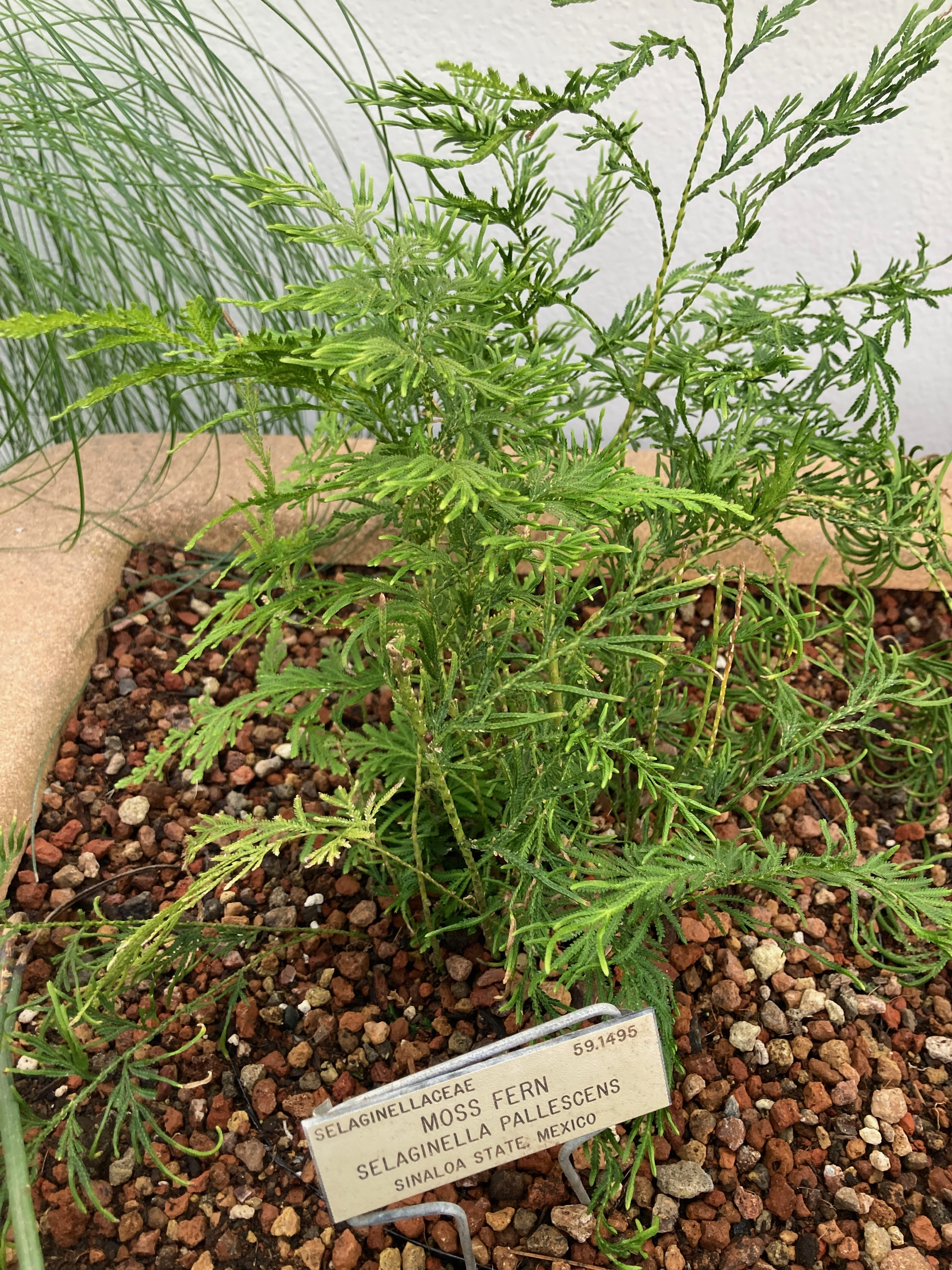
Selaginella pallescens

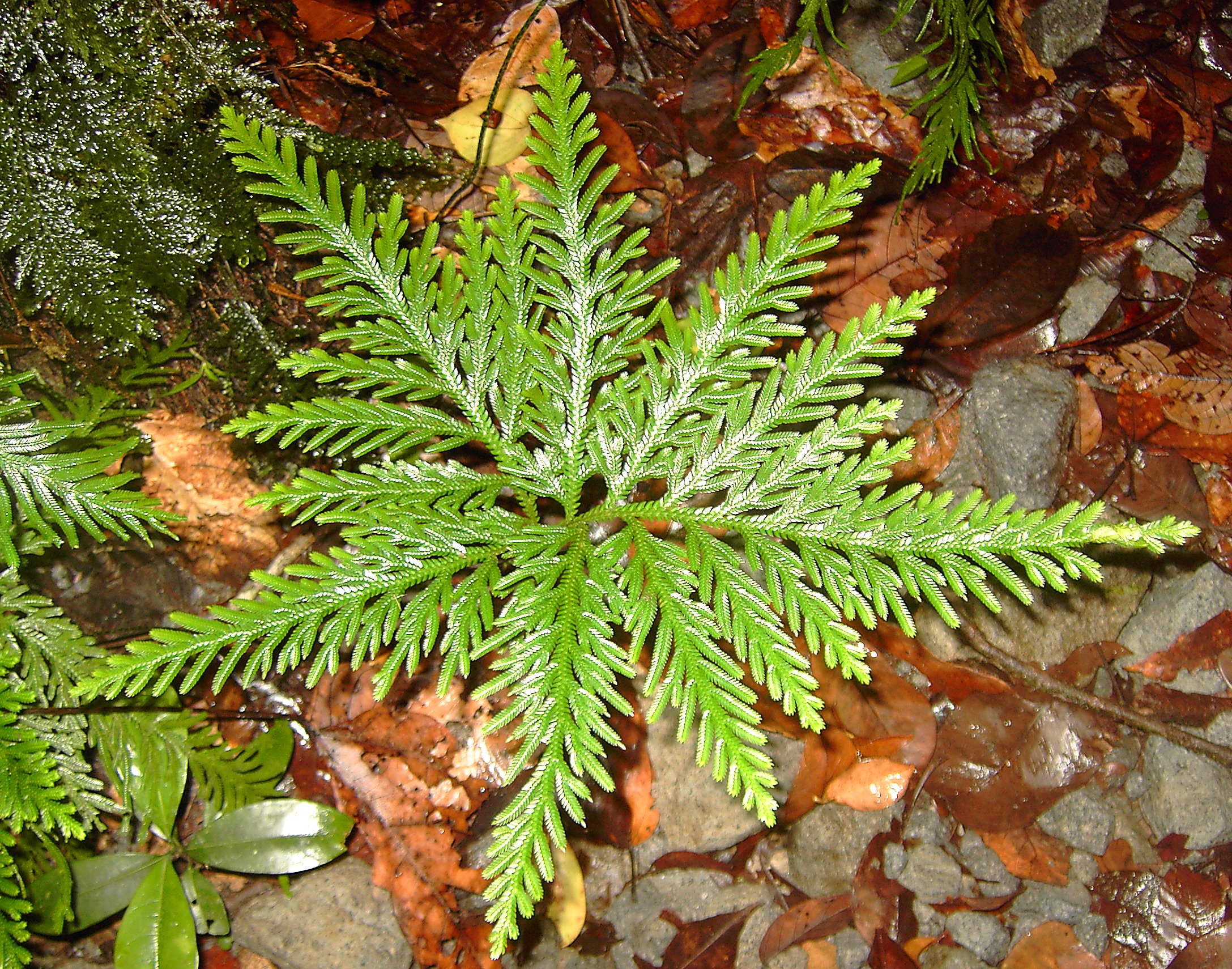
Selaginella flabellata

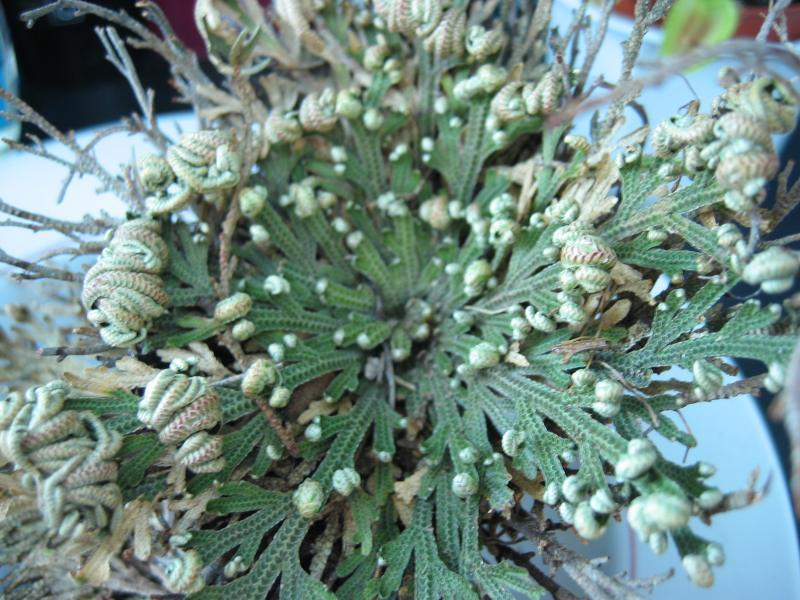
Selaginella lepidophylla

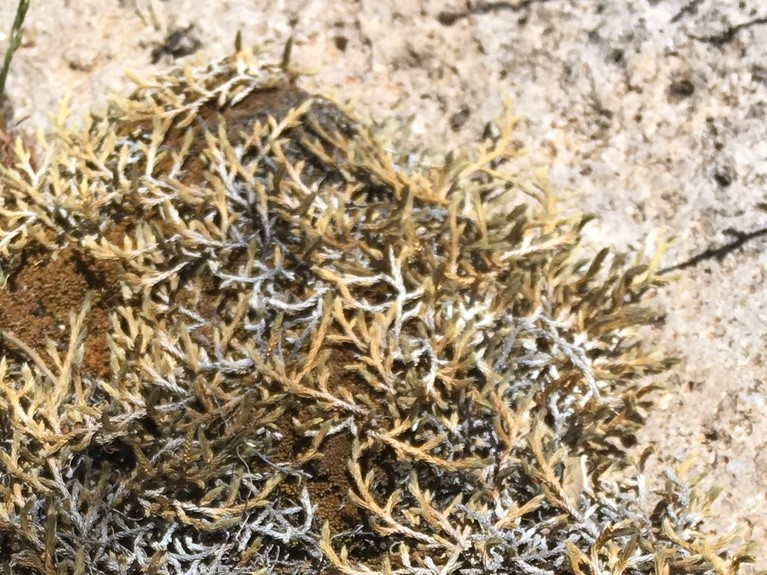
Selaginella × neomexicana

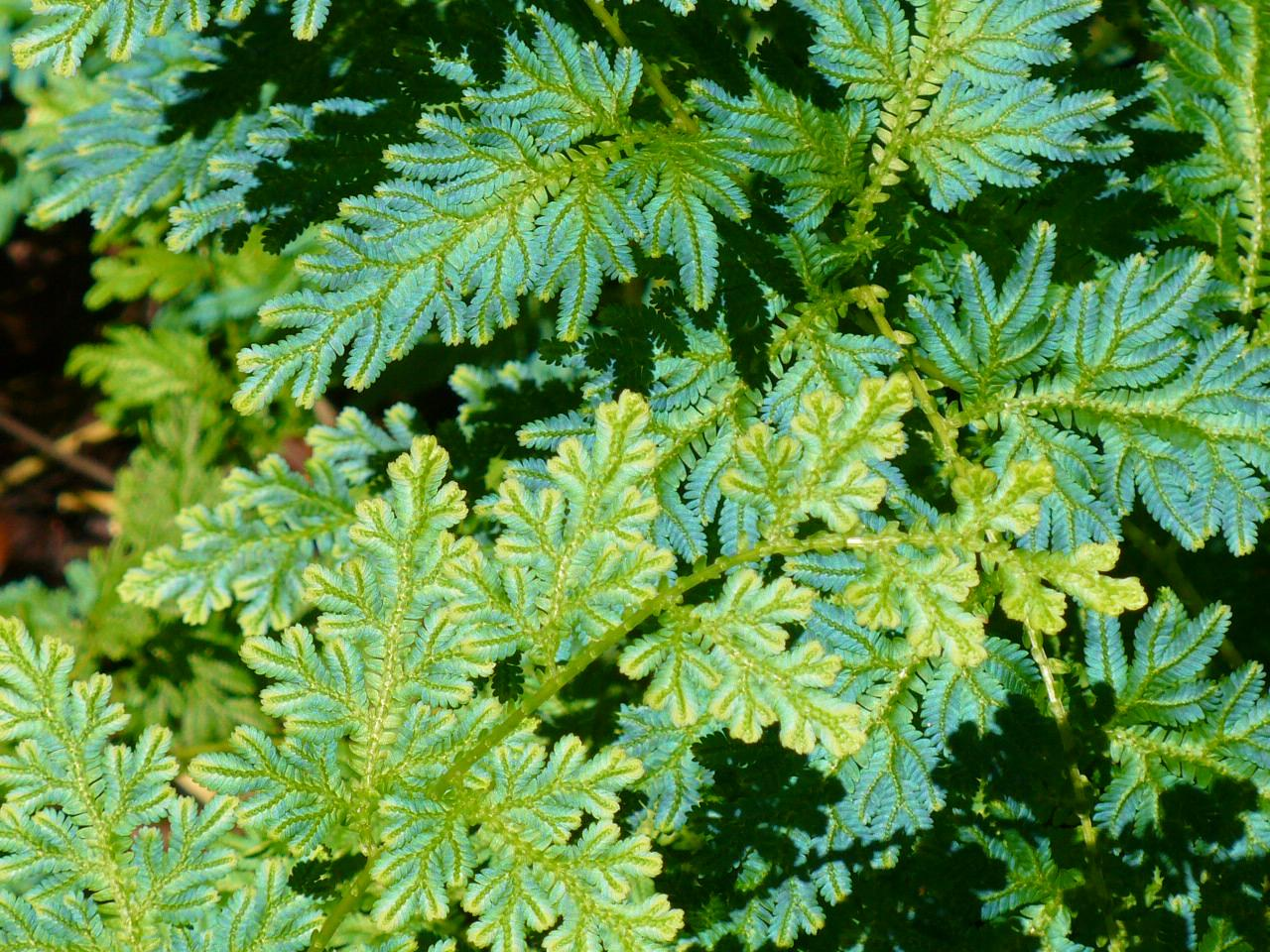
Selaginella willdenowii
