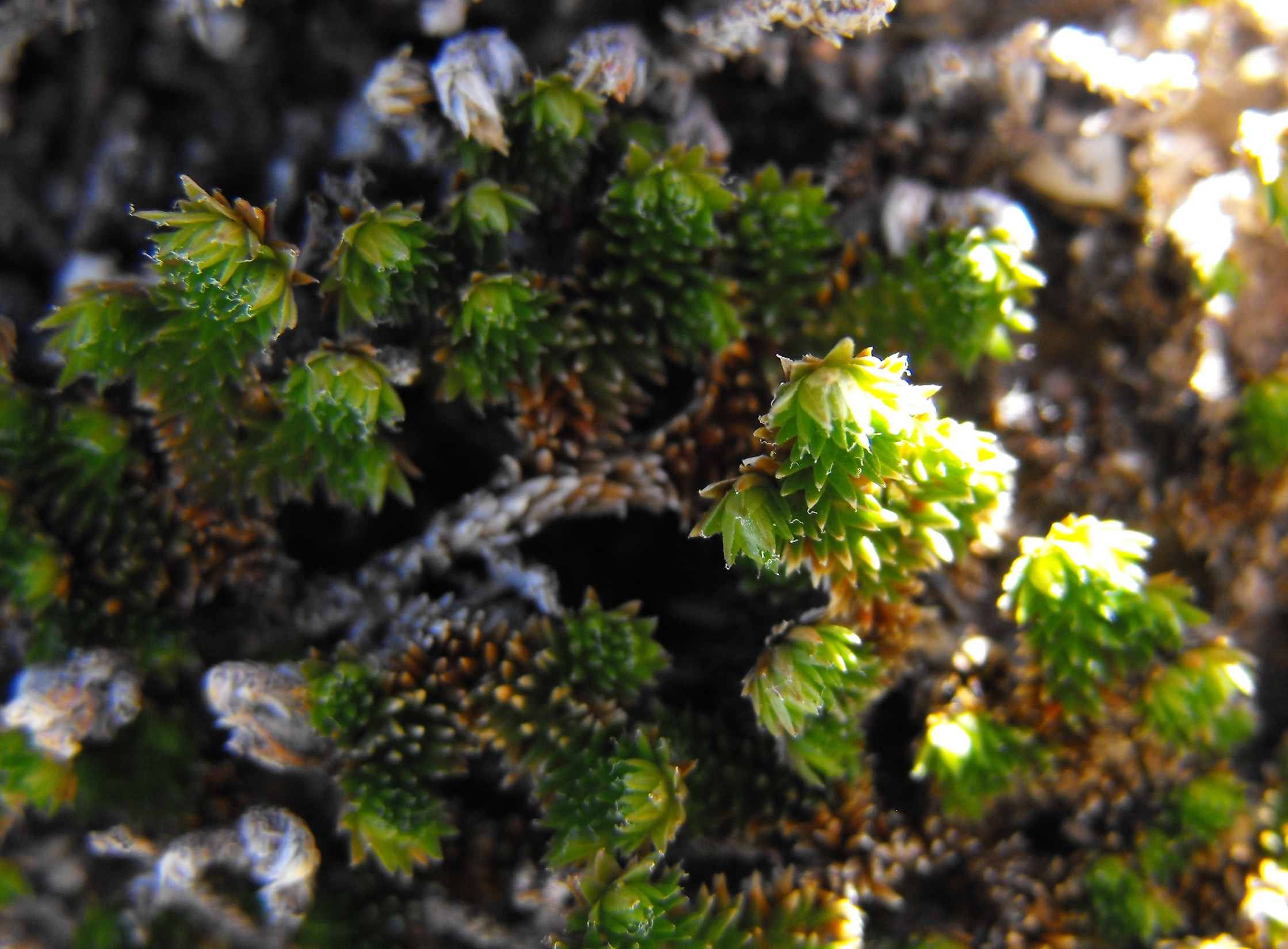

Conservation status
- Apparently Secure (NatureServe)

Scientific classification
- Kingdom: Plantae
- Clade: Tracheophytes
- Clade: Lycophytes
- Class: Lycopodiopsida
- Order: Selaginellales
- Family: Selaginellaceae
- Genus: Selaginella
- Species: S. eremophila

Binomial name
- Selaginella eremophila Maxon

= Selaginella eremophila =

Species of spore-bearing plant

Selaginella eremophila is a species of spikemoss known by the common name desert spikemoss. It is native to the deserts and adjacent mountains around the intersection of California and Arizona with Baja California. It grows in sandy and rocky habitat. This lycophyte forms dense mats of spreading stems with small, forking branches. The lance-shaped leaves are up to 3 millimeters long on the lower stem surfaces and a little shorter on the upper sides. The tiny leaves have pointed tips with soft, twisted bristles. The strobili bearing the reproductive parts are under a centimeter long.
