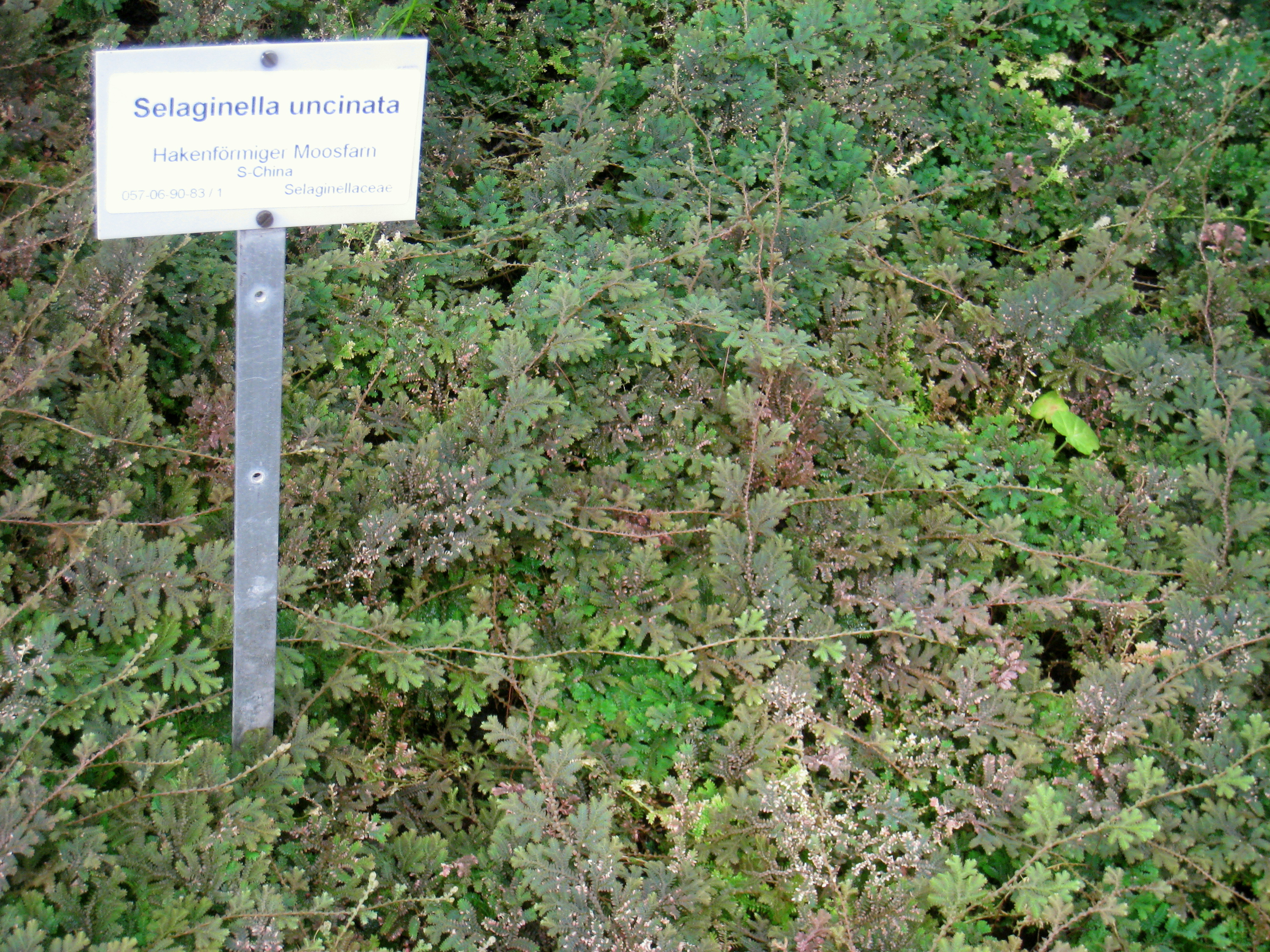

Scientific classification
- Kingdom: Plantae
- Clade: Tracheophytes
- Clade: Lycophytes
- Class: Lycopodiopsida
- Order: Selaginellales
- Family: Selaginellaceae
- Genus: Selaginella
- Species: S. uncinata

Binomial name
- Selaginella uncinata (Desv. ex Poir.) Spring

= Selaginella uncinata =

Species of spore-bearing plant

Selaginella uncinata, the blue spikemoss, peacock fern, peacock spikemoss, rainbow moss, or spring blue spikemoss, is a species of plant in the Selaginellaceae family.

It is widely cultivated outdoors along the Gulf Coast of the United States and in greenhouses and nurseries. It is a native of southern China and is closely allied to Selaginella delicatula (Desvaux ex Poiret) Alston, also in part from China.
