= Drepanophycaceae =

Drepanophycaceae Temporal range: Late Silurian–Late Devonian

Scientific classification
- Kingdom: Plantae
- Clade: Tracheophytes
- Clade: Lycophytes
- Order: †Drepanophycales
- Family: †Drepanophycaceae; Kräusel & Weyland, 1949

Genera
- Baragwanathia; Drepanophycus

Extinct family of spore-bearing plants

Drepanophycaceae is a family of extinct lycophytes of Late Silurian to Late Devonian age (427 to 359 million years ago), found in North America, China, Russia, Europe, and Australia.

== Description ==
The stems are several mm to several cm in diameter and several cm to several metres long, erect or arched, dichotomizing occasionally, furnished with true roots at the base. Vascular bundle an exarch actinostele, tracheids of primitive annular or helical type (so-called G-type). Leaves are unbranched microphylls several mm to 2 cm or more long with a single prominent vascular thread, arranged spirally to randomly on the stem. Homosporous sporangia borne singly on the upper leaf surface or in an axillary position.

Drepanophycaceae differs from a related family of the same period, Asteroxylaceae, in having vascularized microphylls; see Drepanophycales for more details.

== Genera ==
The genera in the family are:

- Drepanophycus Göppert (type genus)
  - microphylls short, tapering rapidly from wide base (thorn-shaped)
  - microphylls arranged spirally or randomly on stem
  - sporangia borne on upper surface of microphylls
- Baragwanathia Lang & Cookson
  - microphylls long, not tapering over most of length (strap-shaped)
  - microphylls arranged spirally on stem
  - sporangia borne axially (whether on microphylls or on stem is not known)
