= September 1966 =

Month of 1966

<<	September 1966					>>
Su	Mo	Tu	We	Th	Fr	Sa
				1	2	3
4	5	6	7	8	9	10
11	12	13	14	15	16	17
18	19	20	21	22	23	24
25	26	27	28	29	30

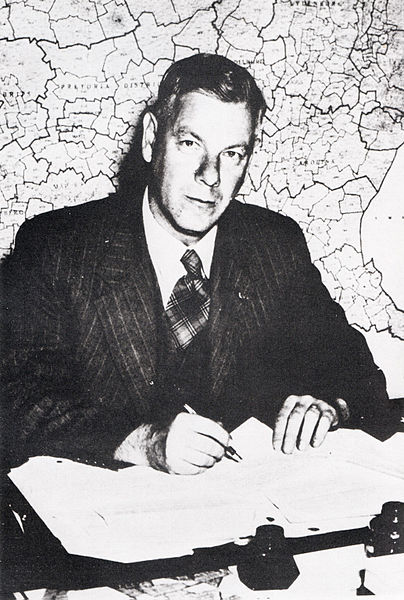
September 6, 1966: South African Prime Minister Verwoerd stabbed to death

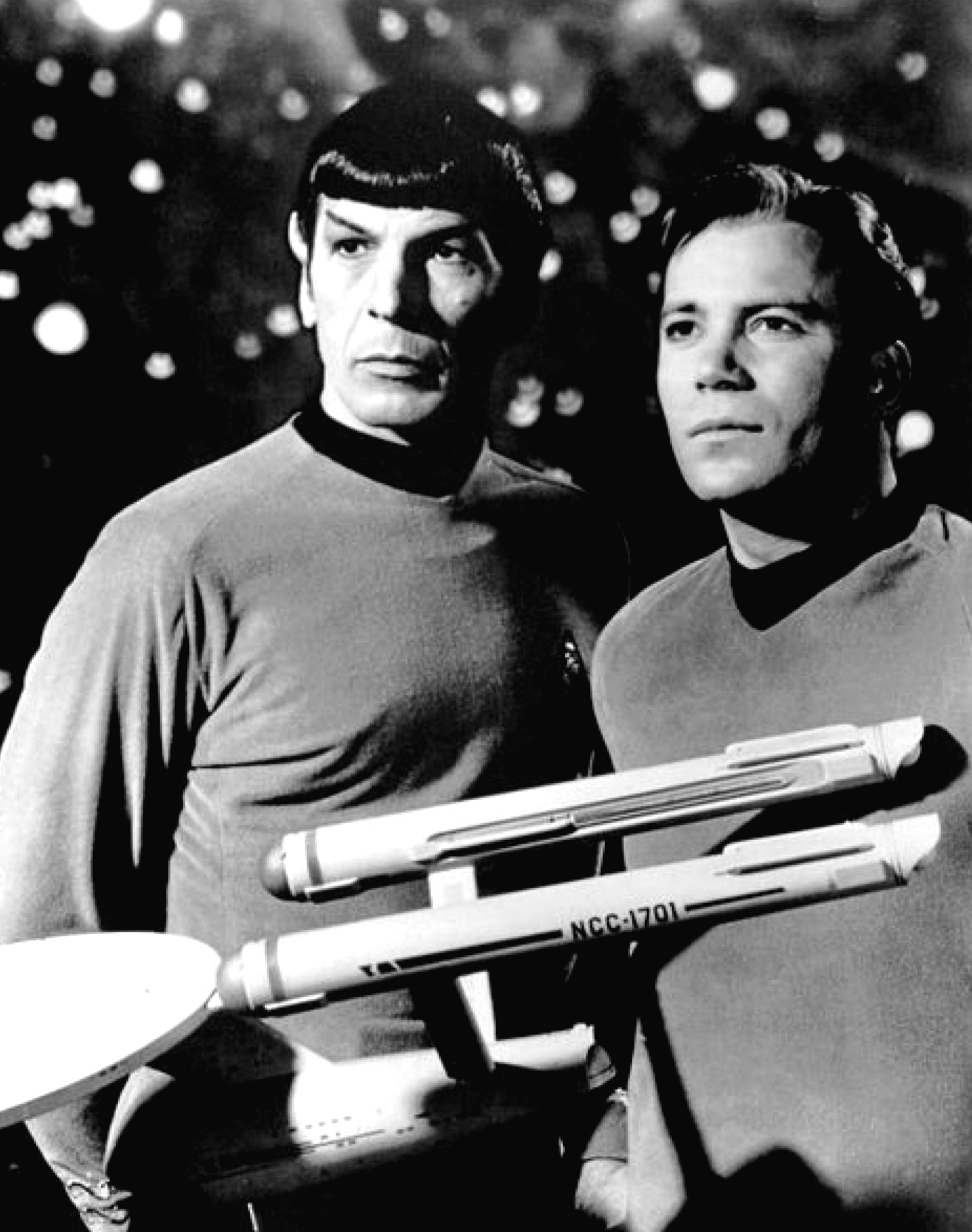
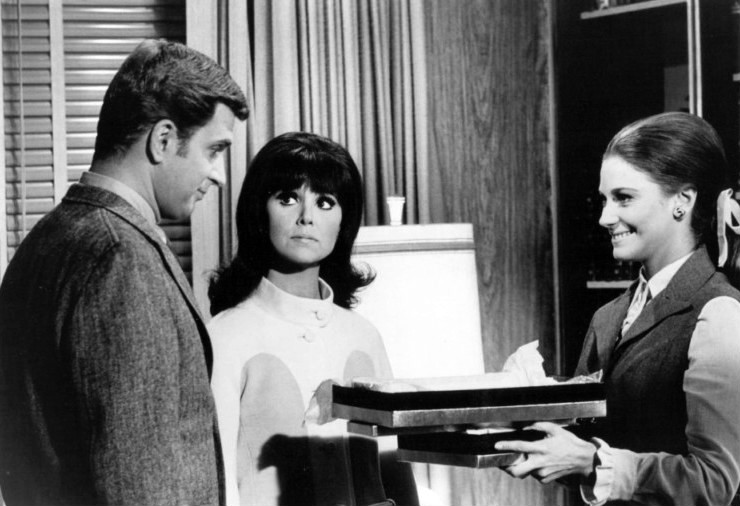
September 8, 1966: Star Trek and That Girl premiere on same night

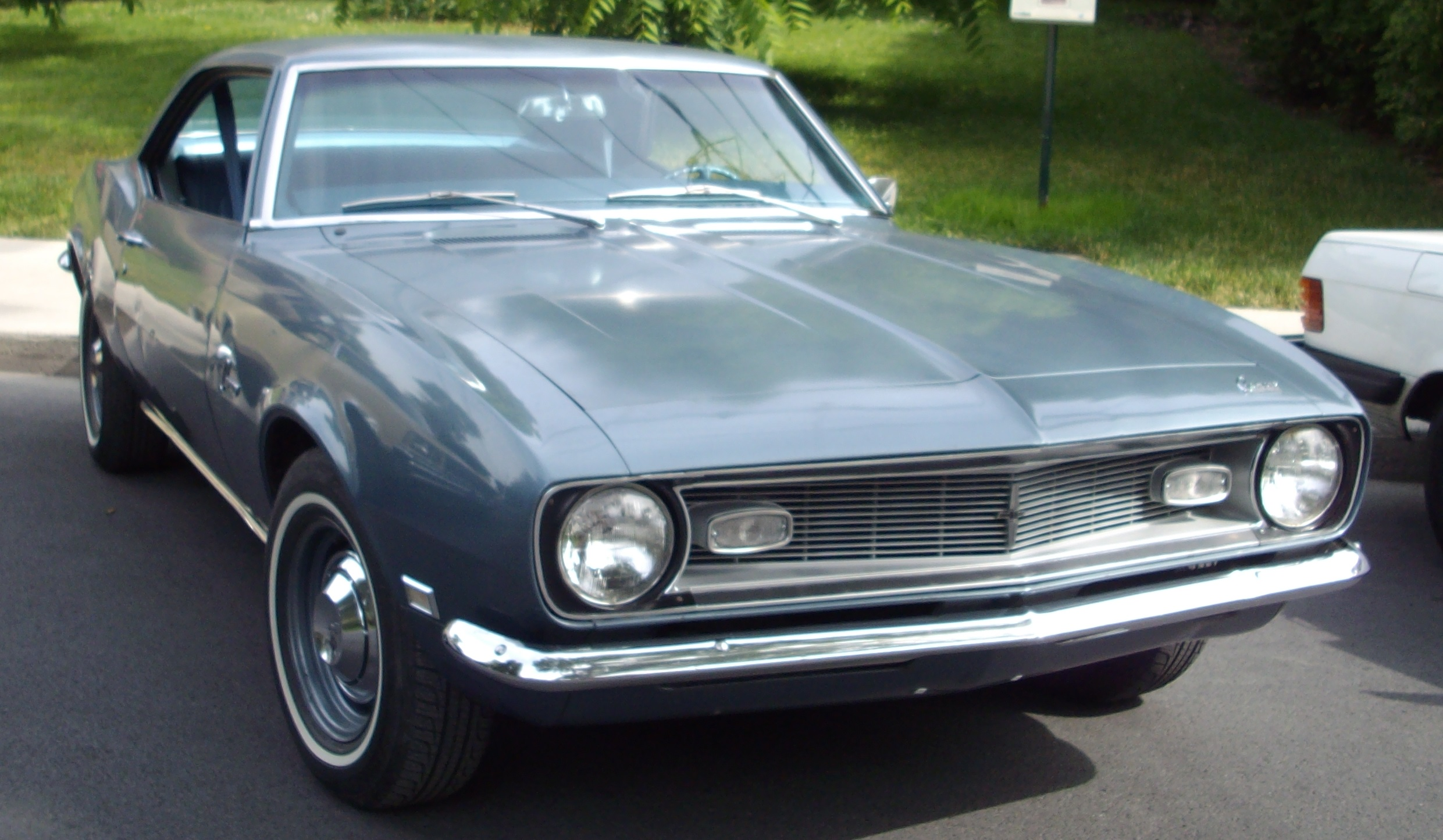
September 29, 1966: The Chevy Camaro goes on sale nationwide. Pictured, a 1968 or 1969 model

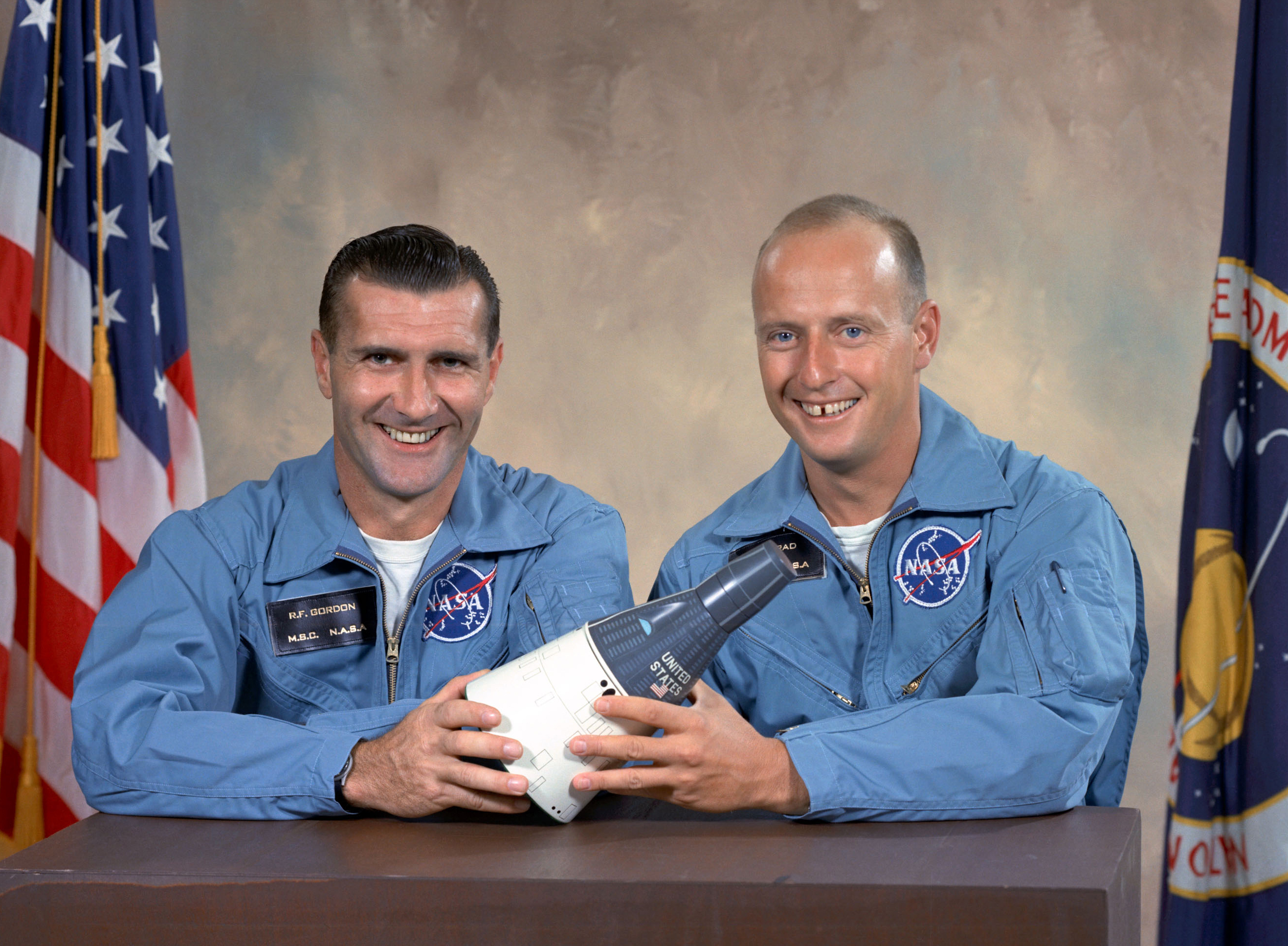
September 12, 1966: Gemini 11's Gordon and Conrad reach 850 miles altitude, higher than anyone had gone before

The following events occurred in September 1966:

== September 1, 1966 (Thursday) ==
- Britannia Airways Flight 105, a chartered plane, crashed as it was making the approach to the city of Ljubljana, in Yugoslavia, killing 98 people, nearly all of them British tourists who had departed, the night before, from the Luton Airport near London. A later investigation would conclude that the pilot had failed to adjust the altimeter setting to reflect the QFE directions from the controller on the elevation of the airfield, and came in 125 feet (38 m) lower than the instruments showed.
- China's Prime Minister Zhou Enlai ordered members of the Red Guards to stop their attacks on Mrs. Soong Ching-ling, the widow of the founder of China's republic and first President, Sun Yat-sen. Chou informed them that Mrs. Soong (who had parted ways with her sister Soong Mei-ling, the wife of Taiwan's President Chiang Kai-shek) had been designated as "a heroine of the Chinese Communist revolution" and that disrespect to her would not be tolerated. In addition, Chou told the Red Guards to halt their violence against Chinese citizens and to quit destroying artwork, noting that "objects of no use for China" could still be exported and sold to pay for technical equipment. His speech would be published nationwide on September 16, bringing some control over the violence of the Cultural Revolution.
- At 3:00 am in Dayton, Ohio, one or more white assailants murdered Lester Mitchell, an African-American man, in a drive-by shooting. Mitchell's killing triggered the 1966 Dayton race riot, the largest in the city's history, which resulted in 30 injuries and over 100 arrests.
- While waiting at a bus terminal, Ralph H. Baer, an inventor with Sanders Associates, wrote a four-page document which laid out the basic principles for creating a video game to be played on a television set. As Baer, a division manager for Sanders Associates, described it, he had been on New York City's East Side, waiting to board a bus to Boston, when he noticed an advertisement for TV Guide on the wall. Contemplating what a viewer could do with a television set if there was nothing worth watching, he remembered an idea that had occurred to him in 1951, the possibility of playing a game on a TV set, and realized that he now had the resources to develop the concept. His idea would become the Magnavox Odyssey home entertainment system, introduced on January 27, 1972.
- United Nations Secretary-General U Thant declared that he would not seek re-election, because of the failure of U.N. efforts to end the Vietnam War. "Today it seems to me, as it has seemed for many months, that the pressure of events is remorselessly leading toward a major war... In my view the tragic error is being repeated of relying on force and military means in a deceptive pursuit of peace."
- The 24th World Science Fiction Convention (Tricon) opened at the Sheraton-Cleveland in Cleveland, Ohio. The guest of honor was L. Sprague de Camp and the toastmaster was Isaac Asimov.
- Color television was introduced to Canada at 8:30 p.m. Eastern time as the Canadian Broadcasting Corporation (CBC) presented the one-hour special Color Preview '66, followed by its documentary series Telescope. At the time, an estimated 50,000 of the five million sets in Canada were color TVs, so 99 percent of viewers continued to see the programming in black and white. CBC would be followed on September 6 by the CTV Television Network, with the new series Star Trek broadcast in color.
- KUAM-FM, Guam's first FM radio station, began broadcasting under the name FM94.
- Born: Tim Hardaway, American NBA player; in Chicago

== September 2, 1966 (Friday) ==
- Alabama Governor George C. Wallace signed a bill into law, refusing to accept U.S. federal government aid to the state's education program. The new law, intended to prevent the federal government from forcing racial desegregation in Alabama schools, was passed in response to guidelines issued by the U.S. Department of Health, Education and Welfare. Governor Wallace said that he had pushed the bill "in the interest of preserving the freedoms and rights of our people to make the decisions that determine the destiny of their children". Less than three hours earlier, the measure had been approved, 70–18, by the Alabama House of Representatives, after passing the state Senate, 28–7. "The governor's effort only delayed the inevitable", an author would note later, but would note that even in December, after the school segregation was no longer legal, only 2.4% of black students in Alabama were attending formerly all-white schools.
- The United States expelled Soviet diplomat Valentin A. Revin, the Third Secretary of the USSR's embassy in Washington, after accusing him of trying to steal American missile secrets. Twelve days later, the Soviet Union would expel the Second Secretary of the American Embassy in Moscow, Donald R. Lesh, on accusations of espionage.
- Born: Salma Hayek, Mexican-born American film and television actress; in Coatzacoalcos, Veracruz state
- Died: J. Howard McGrath, 62, former U.S. Attorney General and former Governor and U.S. Senator for Rhode Island, died of a heart attack

== September 3, 1966 (Saturday) ==
- The London Midland Region of British Railways closed the former Great Central Railway London Extension to passenger traffic between Aylesbury and Rugby Central, bringing an end to its career as "the last main line".
- Born: Edward Felsenthal, former editor-in-chief and CEO of Time magazine; in Memphis, Tennessee
- Died:
  - Fu Lei, 58, literary scholar who had translated the works of Voltaire and Honoré de Balzac into Chinese. Fu and his wife, Zhu Meifu, hanged themselves in their home after continued humiliation and torture from the Chinese Communist Party and by the Red Guards. His reputation would be rehabilitated in 1979.
  - Chen Mengjia, 55, Chinese archaeologist and professor at Tsinghua University, and his wife, Lucy Chao, committed suicide in his home after being persecuted by the Red Guards.
  - Frank Schmitz, 20, American trampoline gymnast, was killed in a plane crash.
  - Constantin Bakaleinikoff, 70, Russian-born American film score composer
  - Dick Barwegan, 44, American NFL player, suffered a fatal heart attack.
  - Robert Bristow, 85, British engineer
  - Wesley Dennis, 63, American book illustrator

== September 4, 1966 (Sunday) ==
- After having marched for civil rights in the South, the Congress of Racial Equality (CORE) challenged racism in the northern United States, with a 250-person march through the streets of the Chicago suburb of Cicero, Illinois. Chicago Mayor Richard M. Daley dispatched 50 Chicago police to accompany the marchers as far as the boundary with Cicero, and a contingent of Cicero city police took over the rest of the way, assisted by Illinois state troopers, Cook County Sheriff's deputies and 2,700 troops of the Illinois National Guard. A crowd of 200 white people began following the marchers and heckling them at Cicero Avenue, and at the intersection with Cermak Road, a larger mob of 500 confronted the marchers, and rocks and bottles were hurled. By the time the procession made it back to Chicago, 14 people had been injured (including one heckler who was clubbed and six teenagers who were bayoneted, and 32 whites and 7 blacks were arrested).
- The first telecast of The Jerry Lewis MDA Labor Day Telethon concluded as comedian Jerry Lewis raised over one million dollars for the Muscular Dystrophy Association, with $1,002,114 in pledges in the New York City area alone. Gradually, more television stations would begin showing the annual live broadcast, and more celebrities would join Lewis to perform for charity. In its peak year, 2008, the event would bring in $65,031,393.
- The 1966 European Athletics Championships came to a close at the Nép Stadium, Budapest, Hungary, with the Men's marathon.
- Born:
  - Jearl Miles Clark (born Jearl Miles), American Olympic champion athletics competitor; in Gainesville, Florida
  - Yanka Dyagileva, Soviet Russian poet and singer-songwriter; in Novosibirsk (died by drowning, 1991)
  - Biréli Lagrène, French jazz guitarist and bassist; in Soufflenheim, Alsace
  - Jeff Tremaine, American film and television director and producer, co-creator of Jackass; in Durham, North Carolina

== September 5, 1966 (Monday) ==
- Thermus aquaticus, a previously unknown species of bacteria that could tolerate high temperatures, was first gathered by scientists who were researching water samples from the hot springs of Yellowstone National Park in Wyoming. The source was collected from Mushroom Spring, in the Park's Lower Geyser Basin, by microbiologist Thomas D. Brock of Indiana University, and he and Hudson Freeze successfully isolated cultures from the spring. From T. aquaticus, the heat-resistant enzyme Taq polymerase (or Taq) would be developed, revolutionizing genetic engineering.
- Darel Dieringer won the 1966 Southern 500 NASCAR race held at Darlington Raceway in Darlington, South Carolina. Richard Petty, who had avoided a pit stop to replace his car's right-side tires, had maintained a lead until seven laps remained. Then, having raced for several miles "on the cord", he suffered a blowout.
- Flying a MiG-17 jet, Nguyễn Văn Bảy became the first North Vietnamese fighter ace, when he shot down his fifth airplane, a U.S. Navy F-8 fighter. The American pilot, U.S. Air Force Captain Wilfred K. Abbott, ejected to safety, but was captured and would spend more than six years as a prisoner of war.

== September 6, 1966 (Tuesday) ==
- South African Prime Minister Hendrik Verwoerd, 64, the architect of apartheid, was stabbed to death by Dimitri Tsafendas during a parliamentary meeting in Cape Town. Verwoerd had been expected to make a major announcement, and was seated at a table at the front of the chambers. At 2:14 p.m., Tsafendas, a parliamentary messenger, approached Verwoerd as if to deliver a message, then pulled a 6-inch (150 mm) knife from his uniform and stabbed Verwoerd four times in the chest and neck; five physicians (four of them MPs) tried to save the Prime Minister, who was dead on arrival at the Groote Schuur Hospital ten minutes later. Ironically, Tsafendas gave as his motive that the white supremacist Prime Minister was doing too much for nonwhites and not enough for South Africa's white population. On October 21, Tsafendas, who claimed that he was slowly being consumed from the inside by a giant tapeworm, would be found to be mentally unfit to stand trial. After being held at Robben Island, and at the Pretoria Central Prison, he would eventually be housed at Sterkfontein Hospital in Krugersdorp, and would die on October 7, 1999, at the age of 81. Theophilus Eben Dönges, the Minister of Finance, served as acting Prime Minister until Verwoerd's successor could be picked a week later.
- The Commonwealth Prime Ministers' Conference opened in the United Kingdom, hosted by Prime Minister Harold Wilson.
- Although it would debut in the United States on the NBC television network two days later, Star Trek actually appeared for the first time anywhere on Canada's CTV Television Network, at 7:30 p.m. Eastern time. Two of the stars were Canadian natives; William Shatner (Captain Kirk) was from Montreal and James Doohan (Mr. Scott) was from Vancouver.
- Born: Joan Guetschow, American Olympic biathlete; in Akron, Ohio
- Died: Margaret Sanger, 86, American birth control advocate, died of arteriosclerosis

== September 7, 1966 (Wednesday) ==
- In Grenada, Mississippi, Martin Luther King Jr. was being driven through town along with other Southern Christian Leadership Conference leaders, including Bernard Lee and Andrew Young, when a middle-aged white gas pump attendant recognized him when the car was stopped at a traffic light. According to SCLC education director Robert L. Green, who was also in the car, James Belk "began to stride quickly and deliberately to the car... Suddenly, he pulled a pistol from his pocket. Before we could respond, he planted the pistol on Dr. King's temple. 'Martin Luther King!' he shouted, 'I will blow your brains out!'". Green noted later, "Dr. King did not flinch. Instead, he turned to the potential assailant, the gun still on his temple, and said in his always resonant voice, 'Brother, I love you.' The man displayed a look of stunned disbelief. Slowly, he lowered his weapon and walked away." After they drove on, Andrew Young said, "Martin, we've asked you, for safety reasons, to sit in the back seat, in the middle," and King replied that John F. Kennedy "had the Army, Navy, the Air Force, Coast Guard and the Secret Service, and they killed him. When they are ready, they will get me."
- The profession of clinical pharmacy, a branch of pharmacy medicine where a certified pharmacist works with the physician in planning the optimum use of medicines in the prevention and treatment of illness, was launched. According to the University of California, San Francisco, on the 8th Floor of the UCSF Medical Science Building, "it was here... that clinical pharmacy officially came in the world", the product of an effort between three UCSF College of Medicine professors and UCSF Chief Pharmacist Eric Owyang.
- The U.S. Department of Defense announced what would be the largest draft call of the Vietnam War, calling for 49,200 registered men to be inducted into military service for the month of October, the highest numbers since the Korean War.
- Born:
  - Toby Jones, English film actor; in Hammersmith
  - Gunda Niemann-Stirnemann, German Olympic speed skating gold medalist and winner of eight world championships between 1991 and 1999; in Sondershausen, East Germany

== September 8, 1966 (Thursday) ==
- Angry over being denied a governmental post after leading a 1966 coup d'état in Syria, Colonel Salim Hatum attempted to take control of the nation by taking several of the nation's leaders hostage while they were at Ba'athist Party Headquarters in the Druze Muslim city of As-Suwayda. The military strongman, General Salah Jadid, and President Nureddin al-Atassi, were taken hostage while Hatum made his demands and threatened to execute them. Defense Minister Hafez al-Assad, however, was still in Damascus, and, after warning Hatum and his mutineers to lay down their weapons, bombed the city's citadel, and sent tanks and men of the 70th Armored Command to retake the city. Hatum was able to flee to neighboring Jordan, and 400 Syrian Army officers were dismissed. Assad consolidated further power as the guarantor of the regime's safety and would seize control of Syria in 1970. As for the notoriously ruthless Colonel Hatum, he would be sentenced to death in absentia but would make the mistake of returning to Syria in 1967, where he would be arrested and shot shortly after crossing the border.
- Star Trek, the new science fiction television series from NBC, was broadcast for the first time on American television, with its first episode "The Man Trap" showing at 8:30 p.m. Eastern time, following the premiere of NBC's Tarzan (two seasons), starring Ron Ely. (However, Star Trek, which starred Canadian-born William Shatner, had actually been televised first in Canada two days earlier, at 7:30 p.m. on the CTV network.) The show was the first in what would become an ongoing franchise active more than 50 years later, and the basis for films and for eleven additional shows, as well as books, games and memorabilia.
- Premiering on the same evening was That Girl, which would last for five seasons, an ABC sitcom starring Marlo Thomas. Initial reaction to That Girl was generally positive, while UPI critic Rick Du Brow said that "'Star Trek', a science fiction opus centering around a mammoth space ship, is so absurd that it is almost entertaining." Two unsuccessful shows introduced that evening were The Hero, an NBC sitcom starring Richard Mulligan, which would be canceled in mid-season; and The Tammy Grimes Show, an ABC sitcom airing at 8:30 p.m., which would be canceled after four episodes.
- The Severn Road Bridge was opened, crossing the Severn estuary between Wales and England. At the opening ceremony, Queen Elizabeth II of the United Kingdom hailed it as the dawn of a new economic era for South Wales.
- International Literacy Day, proclaimed by UNESCO to be celebrated annually each September 8, was observed for the first time in events worldwide.
- Born: Carola Häggkvist, Swedish pop singer; in Stockholm

== September 9, 1966 (Friday) ==
- The National Traffic and Motor Vehicle Safety Act became law after the signing of two bills (the Traffic Safety Act and the Highway Safety Act) by U.S. President Lyndon B. Johnson at a ceremony at the White House Rose Garden. Johnson commented, "The automobile industry has been one of our nation's most dynamic and inventive industries. I hope— and I believe— that its skill and imagination will be able to build in more safety without building on more costs; for safety is no luxury item, no optional extra. It must be the normal cost of doing business." The bills had passed unanimously in the U.S. Senate on June 24 (76–0) and in the House of Representatives on August 17 (371–0).
- According to a complaint registered by the People's Republic of China on September 16, two American F-105 jets strayed from North Vietnam and into the Guangxi Autonomous Region of China and "wantonly strafed Chinese villages and commune members who were working there", wounding three people, until "Aircraft of the Chinese People's Air Force promptly took off to intercept the enemy planes and damaged one of them." U.S. Secretary of State Dean Rusk said that he had no information about such an encounter and said that the U.S. was "looking into it".
- The television series, The Green Hornet, had its first episode broadcast on ABC. Based on the radio series of the same name, the series starred Van Williams as the titled character and Bruce Lee as Hornet's crime-fighting sidekick Kato. Despite it only lasting one season, the series has gained a cult following from Bruce Lee fans and is credited for introducing Asian-style martial arts to an American audience.
- China detonated its third nuclear weapon, a 100-kiloton atomic bomb dropped from a Tu-16 bomber over the Lop Nor desert test site. Scientists outside China noted that the bomb not only contained uranium-235, but the isotope lithium-6 as well, "which attested to China's readiness to test a thermonuclear explosion", the hydrogen bomb. China's "H-bomb" would be exploded nine months later, on June 17, 1967.
- The scheduled launch of Gemini 11 was postponed when a pinhole leak was discovered in the stage I oxidizer tank of the launch vehicle shortly after propellants had been loaded. The decision to repair the leak required rescheduling the launch for September 10.
- NATO moved the Supreme Headquarters Allied Powers Europe (SHAPE) to Belgium, after the organization was evicted from France, and made plans to build a permanent headquarters at the village of Casteau.
- Born:
  - Georg Hackl, German luge world champion in 1989, 1990 and 1997, and Olympic gold medalist in 1992, 1994 and 1998; in Berchtesgaden, West Germany
  - Adam Sandler, American film actor and comedian; in Brooklyn

== September 10, 1966 (Saturday) ==
- Heavyweight boxer Muhammad Ali defended his world title in Frankfurt, West Germany, in a challenge by the European heavyweight champion, Karl Mildenberger, who had not lost a bout in four years. Although Mildenberger was cut above both eyes in the fourth round, and knocked down by Ali in the fifth, the American boxer slowed his pace, giving the German champ time to recover. Finally, in the 12th round, Ali won by a technical knockout (TKO) after the referee stepped in to stop the fight.
- U.S. Air Force Captain Douglas "Pete" Peterson was flying an F-4 Phantom over North Vietnam when he was shot down. Held as a prisoner of war in the "Hanoi Hilton" for six and a half years, he would be released on March 4, 1973, and, after serving as a U.S. Representative from Florida for six years, would return to Hanoi in 1997, as the first United States Ambassador to Vietnam. On his drive to and from the Embassy, Peterson would make it a point to drive past the former POW camp.
- All three American TV networks debuted their Saturday morning lineup of children's cartoons. CBS capitalized on the popularity of superheroes with The New Adventures of Superman and with new heroes created for television by Hanna-Barbera Productions, notably Space Ghost and Frankenstein Jr. and The Impossibles.
- Muhammad Sedki Sulayman was made the new Prime Minister of Egypt, replacing Zakaria Mohieddin, whom President Gamal Abdel Nasser was preparing to be his eventual successor.
- The scheduled Atlas-Agena launch was postponed because of apparent problems with the target launch vehicle autopilot. Launch was rescheduled for September 12.
- Hendrik Verwoerd's state funeral, attended by a quarter of a million people (almost entirely white), was held in Pretoria, South Africa.
- Died: Emil Gumbel, 75, German mathematician and political commentator who had fled the Nazi government in 1932 after his demotion from Heidelberg University.

== September 11, 1966 (Sunday) ==
- France's President Charles de Gaulle closed out his world tour with a visit to French Polynesia, personally witnessing France's third nuclear test at the Mururoa Atoll near Tahiti while wearing a radiation suit. De Gaulle had spent the night on the navy cruiser De Grasse after unfavorable winds had forced a 24-hour postponement of the test. Despite continued winds that would blow the fallout west toward inhabited islands, rather than south to Antarctica, the test took place so that the President could see it before he went to his next scheduled stop. As a result, nuclear fallout and radioactive contamination swept across Tahiti, the Cook Islands, Niue, the Samoan Islands, Tonga, Wallis and Futuna, Fiji and Tuvalu, as monitored by stations in New Zealand.
- Elections took place for the 82-member National Assembly in the Kingdom of Cambodia, with 425 candidates running for office. Among the future leaders elected to seats were future Prime Ministers Long Boret and Khieu Samphan, and former Prime Ministers Sim Var and Yem Sambaur. Longtime Defense Minister Lon Nol, who would abolish the monarchy in 1970 and declare himself the first President of the Khmer Republic, became the 23rd Prime Minister of Cambodia. Khieu would later become the President of Democratic Kampuchea and become one of the architects of the Cambodian genocide between 1975 and 1979.
- Elections were held in South Vietnam for the first time since the installation of a military regime in 1963. Despite attacks on polling places by the Viet Cong, 80.8% of the 5,288,512 registered voters turned out to elect members of a constituent assembly that would draw up a new constitution. There were 540 candidates for the 117 assembly seats, and 96 independents. Foremost among the winners was Phan Khac Suu, who had served briefly as South Vietnam's head of state. A new constitution would be drawn up, and multi-party presidential elections would be held on September 3, 1967.
- Pitcher Nolan Ryan played his first Major League Baseball game, beginning a career that would last 27 years and 807 games (773 of them as the starting pitcher), after being called up directly by the New York Mets from its farm team in the Class A Western Carolinas League, the Greenville (SC) Mets. He would end his playing career 27 years and 11 days later, by pitching for the Texas Rangers on September 22, 1993. In 1966, at age 19, he was the second-youngest major league player, and when he finished in 1993 at age 46, he was the oldest.
- Giacomo Agostini won the first of 15 Grand Prix motorcycle racing world championships, including seven consecutive 500 cc motorcycle world titles.
- Died:
  - Eva Justin, 57, German Nazi anthropologist who contributed to the genocide of the Romani people during the Holocaust;, died of cancer.
  - Charlie Cantor, 68, American comedian and radio actor
  - Collett E. Woolman, 76, co-founder of Delta Air Lines

== September 12, 1966 (Monday) ==
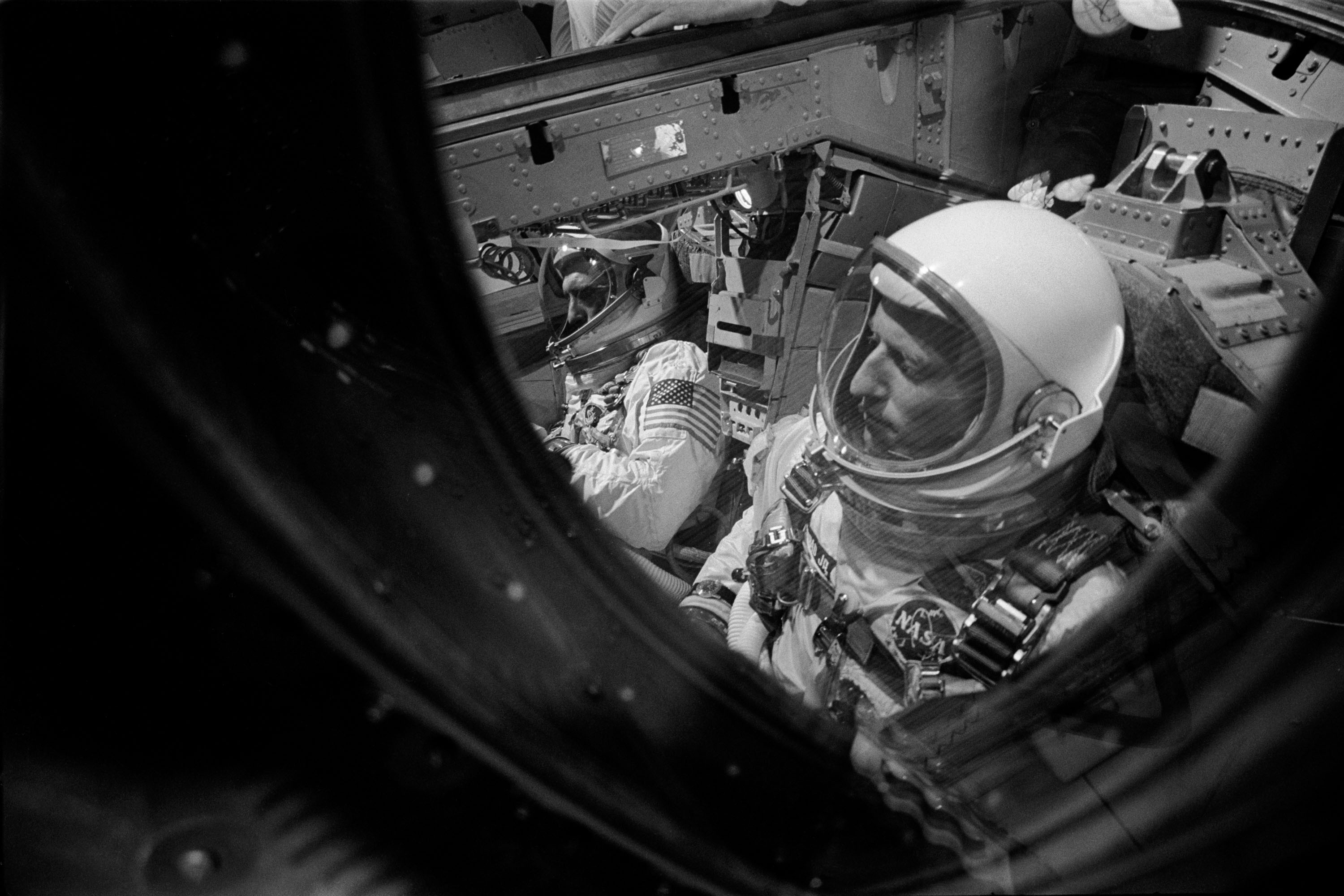
September 12, 1966: Gordon and Conrad in the Gemini 11 spacecraft

- The crew of Gemini 11 docked with an Agena target vehicle on their first try. The mission began with the launch of the Gemini Atlas-Agena target vehicle from complex 14 at Cape Kennedy at 8:05 a.m., EST. The Gemini space vehicle, carrying command pilot Astronaut Charles Conrad, Jr., and pilot Astronaut Richard F. Gordon, Jr., was launched from complex 19 at 9:42 a.m. At 11:07, using the space program's jargon of M being the number of orbits that it would take to effect a docking (and mimicking a catchphrase from the then-popular TV series Get Smart), Conrad radioed to his chief, Flight Director Chris Kraft, "Would you believe... M equals one?" The two vehicles docked nine minutes later.

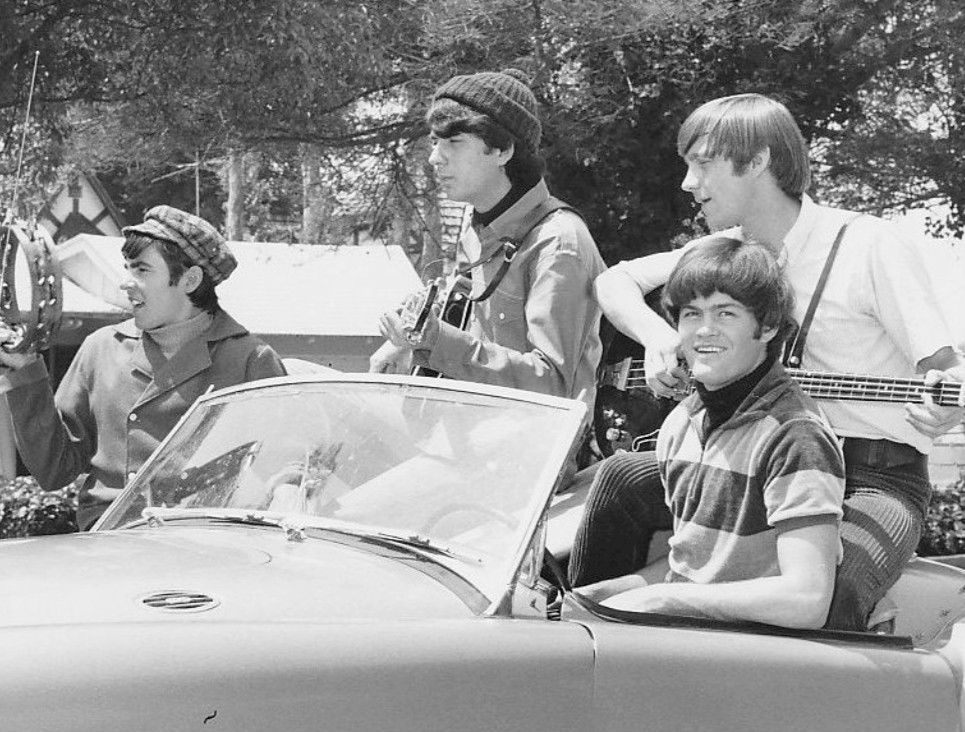
Jones, Tork, Nesmith and Dolenz as The Monkees

- The first episode of the television series The Monkees was broadcast on the NBC network, introducing a rock band that had been assembled as part of the casting of a situation comedy, but whose records would become bestsellers. The group, composed of Davy Jones, Micky Dolenz, Michael Nesmith and Peter Tork, went on to have seven gold records, starting with "Last Train to Clarksville", released on August 16, a month before the show's debut.
- On the first day of school in Grenada, Mississippi, African-American children were allowed to attend a previously all-white public school for the first time. Integration took place without incident at Lizzie Horn Elementary School, and at least 50 black students had walked into John Rundle High School peacefully, until a mob of about 150 whites arrived and began barring any additional blacks from walking into Rundle High. Thirty-five students, who attempted to bypass the mob, were beaten, and bottles, bricks and pipes were thrown at demonstrators. Richard Sigh, a 12-year-old boy, was hospitalized after his leg was broken. The U.S. Justice Department charged the town's mayor, city council, and police chief with "willful failure and refusal" to protect the students, and on October 4, eight members of the United Klans of America would be indicted for conspiracy to violate civil rights, but would be acquitted in June.
- The situation comedy Family Affair, starring Brian Keith and Sebastian Cabot, premiered later in the evening on the CBS network and would run for 138 episodes and five seasons.
- Born:
  - Ben Folds, American singer-songwriter, musician and composer; in Winston-Salem, North Carolina
  - Francine Gálvez, Cameroonian-born Spanish television presenter and news anchor; in Nkongsamba
- Died: Florence E. Allen, 82, the first American woman to serve on a state's highest court; from 1923 to 1934, she was on the Ohio Supreme Court, and from 1956 to 1959, was Chief Judge of the U.S. Court of Appeals for the Sixth Circuit.

== September 13, 1966 (Tuesday) ==
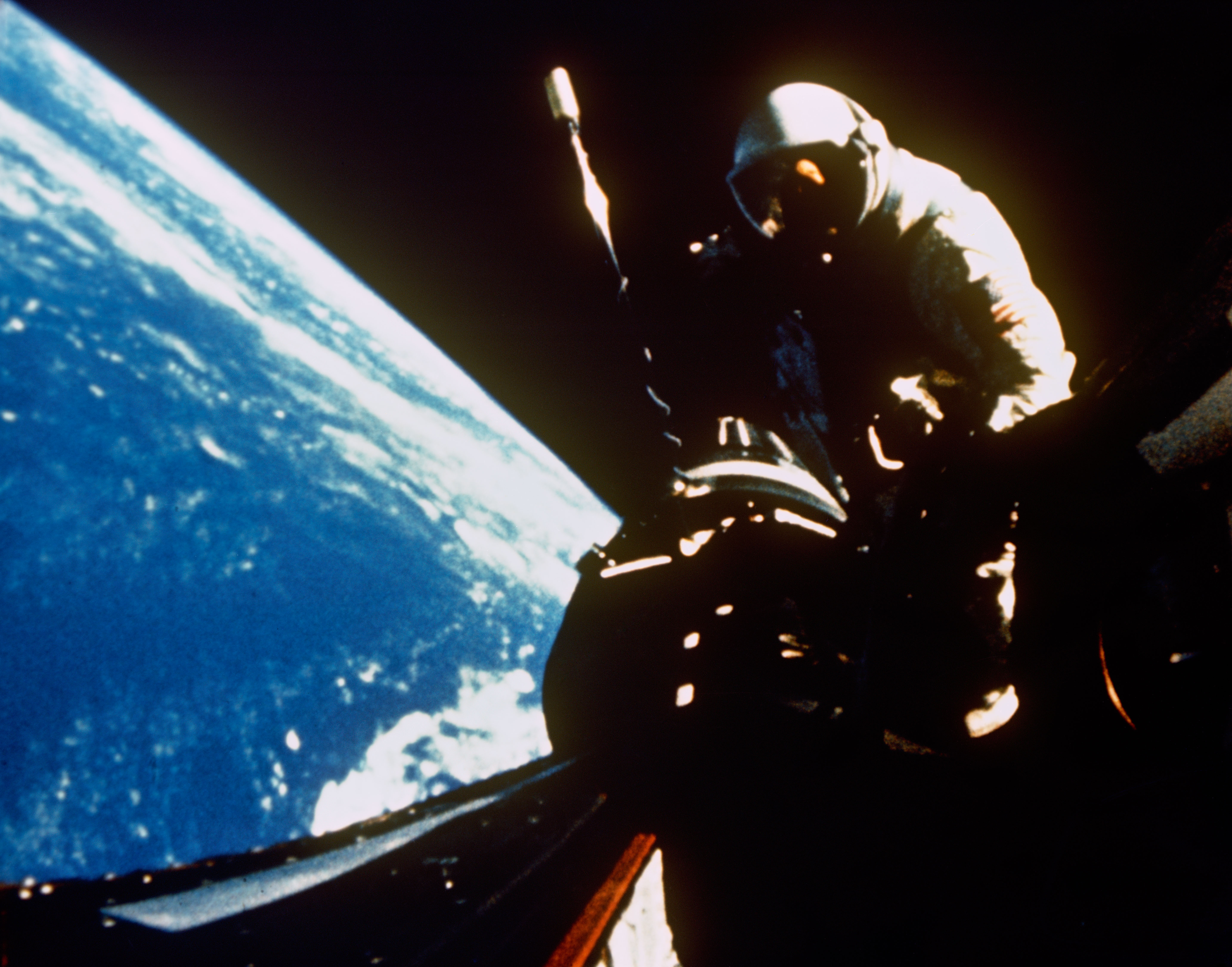
September 13, 1966: Richard F. Gordon Jr. during EVA

- American astronaut Richard F. Gordon Jr. attached a tether between Gemini 11 and Agena for later orbital mechanics testing and commenced extravehicular activity. Gordon became fatigued while attaching the tether from the GATV to the spacecraft docking bar. His work overloaded the spacesuit cooling system, and his vision became obscured by a fogged visor and sweat in his eyes, making it nearly impossible for him to see. Command Pilot Pete Conrad curtailed the planned activities, and Gordon returned to the spacecraft.
- NASA Headquarters Saturn/Apollo Applications Program Office defined mission requirements and Center responsibilities to successfully carry out a Saturn/Apollo Applications 209 mission, a 28-day, crewed, Earth-orbiting flight. Candidate experiments for the mission included 13 engineering, 7 medical, and 6 technology-related experiments.
- Balthazar Vorster was sworn in as the new Prime Minister of South Africa, after being unanimously elected as the new leader of the Nationalist Party to succeed Prime Minister Verwoerd, who had been assassinated a week earlier.
- The first issue of the new daily newspaper, the New York World Journal Tribune, was published eight days after a settlement of the 132-day newspaper strike had been reached.
- Born: Josh Stein, American politician, 76th Governor of North Carolina, in Washington, DC
- Died: Tomoshige Samejima, 77, former Admiral of the Imperial Japanese Navy

== September 14, 1966 (Wednesday) ==
- The West German Navy submarine U-Hai, launched in 1957 as the first German sub since the end of World War II, foundered and sank during exercises in the North Sea, killing 20 of the 21-member crew. The British trawler St. Martin rescued the lone survivor about 200 miles (320 km) east of Tynemouth. The U-Hai had been the U-boat U-2365 in Nazi Germany's Kriegsmarine during World War II, and was scuttled in 1945 after the German surrender. It had been raised and repaired and, on August 15, 1957, recommissioned as the first submarine in West Germany's Bundesmarine fleet. When "a welded seam of the prefabricated boat split", the compartment instantly flooded.
- The Gemini 11 crew activated the engines of the Agena vehicle to raise themselves to a record altitude of 848 miles (1,365 km) above the Earth. Pete Conrad, becoming the first person to see an entire continent in one glance, told ground controllers, "You wouldn't believe it. I can see all of Australia and all around the top of the world." The crew then prepared for Richard F. Gordon, Jr. to perform a stand-up EVA from Gemini 11, extending through the hatch to take astronomical photos. Pilot Pete Conrad reported that the spacewalk was so relaxing they both fell asleep for a moment after sunrise.
- Born: Aamer Sohail, Pakistani cricketer with 122 caps for the national team in Test cricket and 80 in One Day International play; in Lahore
- Died:
  - Nikolay Cherkasov, 63, Soviet film star who portrayed Prince Alexander Nevsky, Alexander Stepanovich Popov, Maxim Gorky, Don Quixote, Ivan the Terrible and (in The Battle of Stalingrad) President Franklin D. Roosevelt.
  - Gertrude Berg, 66, American comedian, stage and television actress, and producer best known for creating and starring in The Goldbergs on radio and television, where she portrayed Molly Goldberg.
  - Hiram Wesley Evans, 84, American white supremacist who was, as the Imperial Wizard of the Ku Klux Klan, the organization's national leader from 1922 to 1939.
  - Cemal Gürsel, 71, President of Turkey from 1960 until March 28, 1966

== September 15, 1966 (Thursday) ==
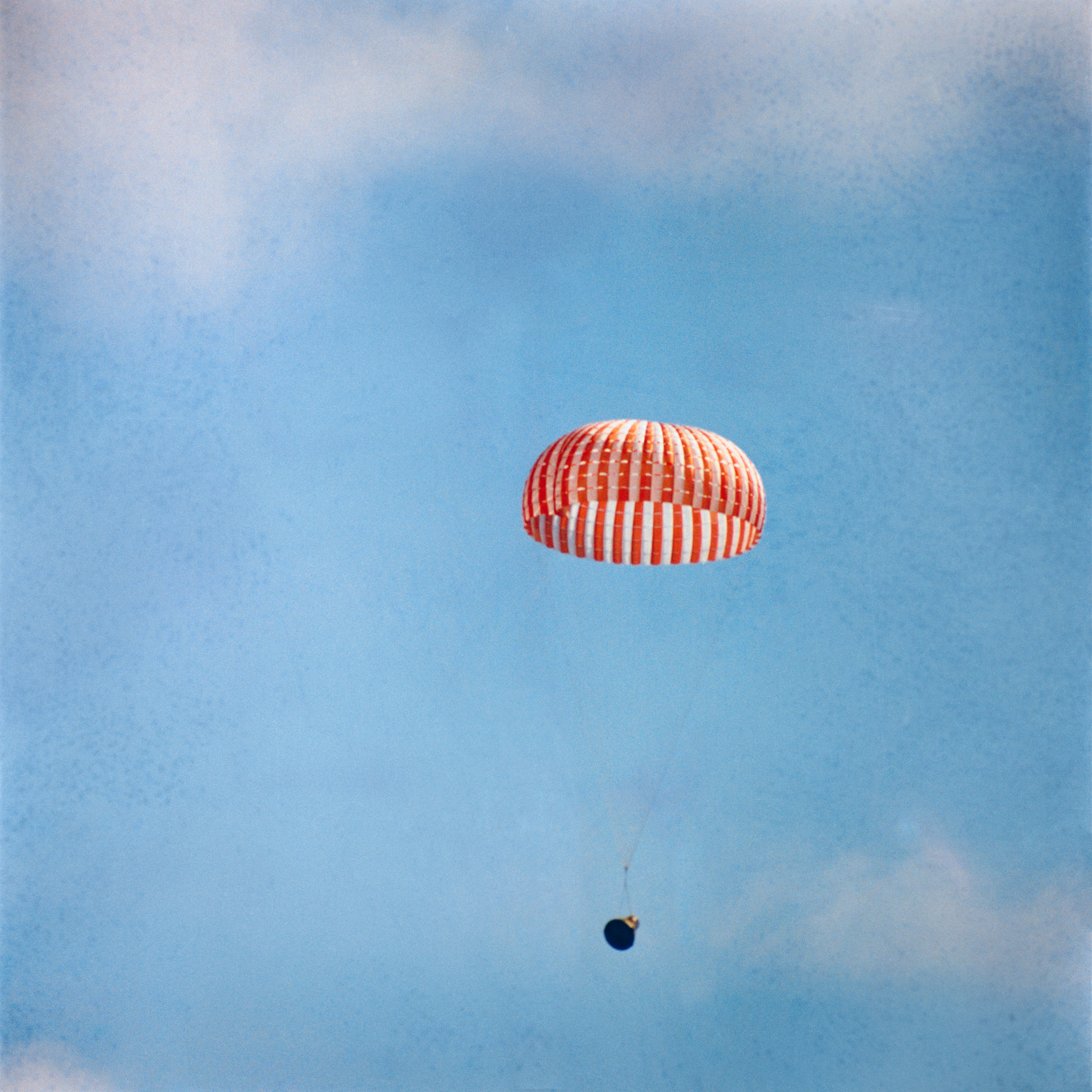
September 15, 1966: Gemini 11 approaches splashdown

- The Gemini 11 crew accomplished a rerendezvous with the Agena target vehicle at 66 hours 40 minutes ground elapsed time, and then prepared for reentry. The spacecraft landed less than 3 miles (4.8 km) from the planned landing point at 71 hours 17 minutes after liftoff. The crew was retrieved by helicopter, and the spacecraft was brought aboard the prime recovery ship, the amphibious assault ship USS Guam (LPH-9), about an hour after landing.
- The Royal Navy launched its first submarine capable of firing nuclear missiles, as the United Kingdom's new Polaris sub, HMS Resolution, departed from the shipyard at Barrow-in-Furness. HMS Resolution would fire its first test missile on February 15, 1968, and begin patrols later that year. Capable of carrying 16 nuclear-tipped Polaris missiles, each with a range of 2,500 miles (4,000 km), the sub was soon joined by HMS Repulse, HMS Renown and HMS Revenge.
- Died: Leonard Brockington, 78, Chairman of the Canadian Broadcasting Corporation from 1936 to 1939

== September 16, 1966 (Friday) ==
- A Japanese freighter, the August Moon, broke apart after striking a reef about 200 miles (320 km) southeast of Hong Kong, after encountering heavy seas caused by Typhoon Elsie. However, all 44 crewmen were saved by helicopters dispatched from the aircraft carrier USS Oriskany (CV-34) and taken to safety to the British frigate HMS Loch Fada (K390). Ironically, 44 crewmen of the Oriskany would die the following month in an onboard fire.
- U.S. Secretary of State Dean Rusk and Philippines Foreign Affairs Secretary Narciso Ramos signed the Ramos-Rusk Agreement, amending the terms of the 99-year leases that the United States had signed in 1947 for military bases in the Philippines. Under the terms of the pact, the remaining term of the leases was changed from 80 years to 25 years, and all leases would expire on September 16, 1991, rather than in the year 2046.
- In South Vietnam, after national elections took place as scheduled for the constitutional revision, Buddhist leader Thích Trí Quang ended a 100-day hunger strike that had started after the government had crushed the Buddhist uprising in June. During that time, the 42-year-old monk had gone from 130 pounds (59 kg) to only 68 pounds (31 kg).
- A British research expedition reported that it had found the bodies of 12 U.S. Navy officers whose plane had disappeared almost five years earlier. The Neptune P-2V had been lost after taking off from Keflavik airport in Iceland on January 12, 1962.
- The Canada–United States Automotive Products Agreement, signed on January 16, 1965, and commonly referred to as "The Auto Pact", came into effect, setting equal standards for the trade of automobiles and motor vehicle equipment.
- The Metropolitan Opera House opened at Lincoln Center in New York City with the world premiere of Samuel Barber's opera Antony and Cleopatra.
- Died: Lawrence Joseph Bader, 39, American amnesia victim, died of a brain tumor. Bader disappeared during a storm while on a fishing trip in 1957, and assumed a new identity as "Fritz Johnson", serving as a news announcer and then a sports director for a Nebraska television station, KETV of Omaha, until he was rediscovered in 1965. Funerals were held for him in Omaha in memory of John "Fritz" Johnson, and in his hometown of Akron, Ohio, where he was buried.

== September 17, 1966 (Saturday) ==
- The American television show Mission: Impossible made its debut, appearing on the CBS network. The premise was that a U.S. intelligence agency, the Impossible Mission Force, would secretly intervene against hostile foreign governments. "As the Vietnam protests mounted in strength," an observer would write later, "the idea of American agents toppling foreign governments became less popular, and the scripts changed, with the team now attacking organized crime." The "missions" of the IMF would continue for seven seasons, until 1973.
- Raumpatrouille Orion (literally "Space Patrol Ship Orion"), West Germany's first science fiction television series and its most expensive production up to that time, made its debut. Conceived and produced independently from Star Trek, its first appearance came a week after the American show, and also featured the adventures of the military crew of a faster-than-light space vessel. Despite being a cult favorite, the German show would run for only seven episodes.
- The 1966 International Gold Cup motor race was won by Jack Brabham in a Brabham BT19. Denny Hulme crossed the line a fraction of a second behind Brabham, driving a slightly newer Brabham model, the BT20.
- Born: Doug E. Fresh, Barbados-born American beat-box rapper; as Douglas E. Davis in Christ Church, Barbados
- Died: Fritz Wunderlich, 35, German operatic tenor, died after falling from a stairway during a hunting vacation. A biographer would later note that "[H]e was struck down in his prime by an avoidable accident. Had he lived longer, he might have become one of the great lyric tenors of the century."

== September 18, 1966 (Sunday) ==
- Valerie Percy, 21, daughter of U.S. Senate candidate Charles H. Percy, was murdered in the family mansion in the Chicago suburb of Kenilworth, Illinois. She had been stabbed to death in her bed. Percy would win election to the Senate in November, but nobody would ever be charged with the murder, and the crime would remain unsolved at the time of his death 45 years later. In 2014, a new book on the murder would identify the late William Thoresen III, who lived with his wealthy family less than two blocks from the Percy home, as the likely suspect. Ironically, Thoresen suffered a fate similar to that of Miss Percy, murdered while lying in his bed.
- The Punjab Reorganisation Act, 1966 was passed into law in India, separating the Hindi language population in the southern portion of the Punjab state from the Punjabi language speakers. On November 1, Haryana would become the 17th state of India.
- Amir Mohammad Khan was replaced as Governor of West Pakistan by General Muhammad Musa Khan Hazara, appointed by President Muhammad Ayub Khan.

== September 19, 1966 (Monday) ==
- Peter Kalitenko, one of two Soviet citizens who had defected to the United States 13 months earlier, returned to the Soviet Union voluntarily, three days after American officials interviewed him to determine that he was returning willingly. On August 7, 1965, Kalitenko and Gregory Sarapushkin got lost while sailing a small boat along the Siberian coast, and landed on a beach near Wales, Alaska. Sarapushkin returned to Russia less than three months later, but Kalitenko had been working in Detroit before becoming homesick.
- At a press conference at the New York Advertising Club, Timothy Leary announced the formation of the League for Spiritual Discovery, which he described as a new "psychedelic religion". "Like every great religion of the past," Leary said, "we seek to find the divinity within and to express this revelation in a life of glorification and the worship of God. These ancient goals we define in the metaphor of the present – turn on, tune in, drop out."
- In London, Ronald "Buster" Edwards, one of the suspects in the Great Train Robbery of August 8, 1963, voluntarily surrendered to detectives from Scotland Yard. After hiding for more than three years, Edwards had exhausted his £150,000 share of the loot from the robbery. Edwards and his partner in crime, James White, would be sentenced to 15 years in prison, but would be paroled on April 2, 1975.
- Indonesia announced that it would resume participation in the United Nations, reversing its January 20, 1965, decision to withdraw. The Indonesian delegation would return on September 28.
- The University of Maryland, Baltimore County (UMBC) held its very first classes as it opened at Catonsville, Maryland, on land formerly owned by Spring Grove State Hospital.
- The U.S. Navy's first attack helicopter unit began operations, supporting U.S. Navy riverine forces operating in South Vietnam's Mekong Delta.
- Born:
  - Eric Rudolph, also known as the "Olympic Park Bomber", American domestic terrorist convicted for a series of bombings across the Southern United States between 1996 and 1998; in Merritt Island, Florida
  - Soledad O'Brien, American broadcast journalist and producer; as Maria de la Soledad Teresa O'Brien in St. James, New York
- Died:
  - Wan Xiaotang, 60, First Secretary of the Communist Party for Tianjin Province, died after being kidnapped and beaten by the Red Guards during the Cultural Revolution.
  - Albert van der Sandt Centlivres, 79, Chief Justice of South Africa from 1950 to 1957

== September 20, 1966 (Tuesday) ==
- The Motion Picture Association of America (MPAA) adopted a new code for film production, eliminating many of the prohibitions that had been in effect for 36 years. MPAA President Jack Valenti initially said that there would be two levels of classification, one ("G") for general releases, and another one ("M") for "mature audiences". "What we are saying," Valenti commented, "is 'Look, Mr. Parent, this may not be a picture you want your child to see!'". In a break from the past, the new Production Code declared that "Censorship is an odious enterprise. We oppose censorship and classification by law because they are alien to the American tradition of Freedom." Ten new standards were now applied in judging a film, including "The basic dignity and value of human life shall be respected and upheld."; "Evil, sin, crime and wrongdoing shall not be justified."; "Detailed and protracted acts of brutality, cruelty, physical violence, torture and abuse shall not be presented."; "Indecent or undue exposure of the human body shall not be presented." "Obscene speech, gestures or movements shall not be presented." and "Excessive cruelty to animals shall not be portrayed and animals shall not be treated inhumanely."
- The American probe Surveyor 2 was launched toward the Moon for purposes of making a soft landing there, but began tumbling out of control after one of its three thruster rockets failed to ignite for a 10-second course alteration. Rather than making the soft landing that had been planned for, the Surveyor probe crashed into the lunar surface on September 23.
- Abdul Rahman Pazhwak of Afghanistan was elected as President of the United Nations General Assembly by a vote of 112–1. The lone dissenting vote was for Salvador P. Lopez of the Philippines.
- Died:
  - William Baragwanath, 88, Australian geologist who discovered the 400 million year old fossils of an extinct plant of the genus Baragwanathia, named in his honor.
  - Fritz Delius; 75, German silent film actor

== September 21, 1966 (Wednesday) ==
- Prompted by recent operational difficulties involving extravehicular activity during Gemini flights 9A, 10, and 11, Deputy Project Manager Kenneth S. Kleinknecht recommended to Saturn/Apollo Applications Program officials in Washington a redesigned forward dome hatch in the S-IVB hydrogen tank; i.e., one that could be more readily removed. He urged installing a flexible type of airlock seal prior to launch of the stage. These changes, Kleinknecht said, would go far toward minimizing astronaut workload for activating the spent stage once in orbit.
- By a vote of 49–37, the United States Senate failed to give the necessary two-thirds approval for a proposed amendment to the U.S. Constitution that would have permitted voluntary prayer in public schools. The resolution had been proposed by Senator Everett Dirksen of Illinois and would have required yes votes from 58 of the 86 Senators present before it could be sent to the individual states for ratification.
- CF Barcelona won the 1966 Inter-Cities Fairs Cup Final, defeating Real Zaragoza 4–3 on aggregate, with Zaragoza winning the first game 1–0, and Barcelona the second one, 4–2. The annual soccer football competition, a predecessor to the UEFA Cup, was set up to promote the concept of international trade fairs. Played between 1955 and 1971, the series consisted of exhibition games ("friendlies") between teams from cities holding trade fairs.
- The last peacekeeping forces from the Organization of American States were withdrawn from the Dominican Republic, slightly less than 17 months after the U.S. Army's intervention in the Dominican Civil War on April 30, 1965. The last troop contingents had been from the United States, Brazil, Costa Rica, El Salvador, Honduras, Nicaragua and Paraguay.
- Died: Paul Reynaud, 87, Prime Minister of France during the surrender to Nazi Germany in 1940

== September 22, 1966 (Thursday) ==
- All 24 people on board Ansett-ANA Flight 149 were killed when an in-flight engine fire caused the left wing to fall apart. The airplane, a Viscount 832, crashed on a sheep farm near Winton, Queensland, in Australia. The plane had departed the Queensland mining town of Mount Isa shortly after twelve o'clock noon, en route to the airfield at Longreach, where it was to pick up more passengers with a final destination of Brisbane. At 1:03, the aircraft crashed into scrubland at Nadjayamba Station.
- Born:
  - Mike Richter, American NHL goaltender and member of U.S. Hockey Hall of Fame; in Abington, Pennsylvania
  - Moustafa Amar, Egyptian musician; in Alexandria

== September 23, 1966 (Friday) ==
- U.S. President Johnson signed the Fair Labor Standards Amendments of 1966 into law, extending a minimum wage (of at least $1.00 per hour) for the first time to workers on farms, in restaurants, hotels and motels, laundries and dry cleaners, and to state and local government employees of schools, hospitals and nursing homes, effective February 1, 1967. The raise had been approved by the U.S. House of Representatives, 259–89, and on September 14 by the U.S. Senate, 55–38. In addition, the minimum wage for other occupations would be raised 28% over the next 17 months, from $1.25 an hour to $1.40 in 1967, and $1.60 in 1968.
- The untethered astronaut maneuvering unit (AMU), installed on September 17 for the Gemini 12 mission for November was canceled. Persistent problems in performing EVA on earlier flights had slowed the originally planned step-by-step increase in the complexity of EVA for spacewalks. While three EVA would be performed by Buzz Aldrin on the Gemini 12 mission on November 12, 13, and 14, all would be done with Aldrin tethered to the spacecraft.
- The British cargo airline ACE Freighters ceased operations and was placed in liquidation after having run up large debts for fuel.
- Born: Janet Albrechtsen, Australian journalist; in Adelaide, South Australia

== September 24, 1966 (Saturday) ==
- Japan was hit by Tropical Storm Helen in the south at the island of Kyushu, and a few hours later in the central region on the island of Honshu by Typhoon Ida, bringing record winds that were measured at up to 205 miles per hour (330 km/h) on Mount Fuji. Rain and winds from Ida caused landslides on Mount Fuji that destroyed two villages on the mountain's slope, killing 317 people, primarily in the Yamanashi Prefecture. The highest death toll was in the village of Ashiwada, where 170 were dead or missing; Ashiwada is now part of the city of Fujikawaguchiko.
- The Embassy of Portugal to Congo was invaded by a mob of 400 people in Kinshasa, and the ranking diplomat, Chargé d'Affaires Ressano Garcia, was kidnapped and beaten after being dragged from his living quarters. Garcia, who was freed after President Mobutu ordered the Kinshasa police chief to intervene at the headquarters of the "Volunteers for the Congo" group, was hospitalized with a torn ear and a head injury. The mob attack came after Radio Kinshasa had broadcast a report that accused Portugal of having plotted the attempted murder of Angolan rebel Holden Roberto.
- Sirhan Bishara Sirhan, a 22-year-old horse exerciser in Pasadena, California, sustained head injuries after falling from a horse at the Altfillisch Ranch in Corona. According to testimony that would be offered two years later at Sirhan's trial for the assassination of Robert F. Kennedy, his personality seemed to change; he became increasingly resentful of authority and self-obsessed.
- On an airplane flight across the Atlantic to London, backup guitarist James Marshall Hendrix, who had played using the stage name Jimmy James (and had launched his own group, Jimmy James and the Blue Flames), agreed with his manager Chas Chandler that he should launch his solo recording career with a new stage name, as Jimi Hendrix.
- In the 1966 VFL grand final, the St Kilda Saints defeated the Collingwood Magpies by a single point, 74 to 73, in front of 101,655 spectators at the Melbourne Cricket Ground.

== September 25, 1966 (Sunday) ==
- The city of Kisangani was reclaimed from separatist rebels by troops of the Congolese Army after nearly two months of fighting that had started on July 29. During nearly two months of fighting, more than 3,000 people had been killed.
- The rivalry between the American film industry and American television reached a major turning point when an estimated 60,000,000 viewers (a 38.3 rating and a 61 share) tuned in to ABC Sunday Night at the Movies to watch The Bridge on the River Kwai, more than had ever seen a feature film on TV. ABC had paid Columbia Pictures two million dollars for the rights for two showings of the 1957 hit film (which had had a second successful run in cinemas in 1964) and reaped $1.8 million in commercials on the first night, as the Ford Motor Company sponsored the entire film. The result was that the three American networks entered a bidding war as they sought to get the rights to as many motion pictures as possible. The ailing film industry, which had steadily lost customers to television, found the TV networks to be a major source of revenue, and began to budget more for its productions than ever before.
- Gloria Ehret won the 1966 LPGA Championship golf tournament, played at the Stardust Country Club in Las Vegas. With a score of 282 for 72 holes, she finished three strokes ahead of four-time champion Mickey Wright.
- Jubilee, a bestselling American Civil War novel by African-American author Margaret Walker, was first published, as an imprint by Houghton Mifflin.
- Born: Jason Flemyng, English actor; in Putney
- Died:
  - Clifton Cushman, 28, U.S. Air Force pilot who won a silver medal in the 400m hurdles at the 1960 Summer Olympics, was killed when he was shot down in Vietnam.
  - Johannes Van Rensburg, 68, South African lawyer and politician

== September 26, 1966 (Monday) ==
- In a protest over the continuing administration of South West Africa by the apartheid government of South Africa, only 28 of the 118 members of the United Nations had representatives who listened to the address given by South Africa's ambassador, D. P. de Villiers. The boycott began with a walkout by the delegations of 32 of the 36 African nations. However, four of the five members of the UN Security Council— the United States, the Soviet Union, the United Kingdom and France, as well as the African nations of Ethiopia and Liberia (which had sponsored the resolution to end South Africa's mandate), and Malawi and Mauritania, remained to listen to de Villiers.
- Prescott College, a private liberal arts college in Prescott, Arizona, held its first classes, opening with a student body of 80.
- Died:
  - Helen Kane, 62, American popular singer and actress who unsuccessfully sued the creators of the "Betty Boop" cartoons for appropriating her likeness; she was famous for the hit song "I Wanna Be Loved by You" in 1928.
  - Gus Edson, 65, American cartoonist who drew the long running comic strips The Gumps and Dondi

== September 27, 1966 (Tuesday) ==
- Francisco Cuevas Garcia, a 17-year-old boy from Queretaro, Mexico, stowed away on Avianca Flight 80 from Bogotá, Colombia, to Mexico City, but he did it by hiding in the wheel well of the Boeing 707 jet before the plane took off. Cuevas was found by airport workers who arrived to service the plane when it landed, and they pried his leg loose. "The wheels started coming up and I thought I was going to be crushed," the teenager told reporters, and explained that he had been homesick. The jet flew to an altitude as high as 34,000 feet (10,000 m) during the four-hour flight, and Cuevas endured thin air and a lack of heat, with outside temperatures as low as -45 °F (-43 °C). After being turned over by doctors to immigration authorities, who verified his citizenship, Cuevas was placed on a bus for Queretaro. Other young men who read of his story attempted to imitate Cuevas, with one dying in a fall from the wheel well of a jet, and another who would fly from Havana to Madrid in 1969.
- Nien Cheng, a 51-year-old adviser to the British managers of the recently closed Royal Dutch Shell oil company in Shanghai, was arrested and placed in the city's prison, the "Number One Detention House", where she would spend the next six and a half years. As she would recount more than 20 years later in her best-selling memoir of the Cultural Revolution, Life and Death in Shanghai, she would be told upon her release that her offense had been that she had "divulged the grain supply situation in Shanghai" in a letter written in 1957 to a friend in England, and had "defended the traitor Liu Shaoqi".
- A Ku Klux Klansman, who had been charged with the 1965 murder of civil rights worker Viola Liuzzo, was acquitted by a jury in Hayneville, Alabama. Eugene Thomas, who had been sentenced to ten years in prison on a federal court conviction of conspiracy to violate the civil rights of participants in the Selma to Montgomery marches, was found not guilty by a state jury of eight African-Americans and four whites. Alabama Attorney General Richmond Flowers, Sr. had prosecuted the case personally, but had elected not to call the state's two star witnesses.
- A three-day riot broke out at Hunter's Point in San Francisco when a white police officer, Alvin Johnson, shot and killed a 16-year-old African-American boy, Matthew Johnson, who was fleeing the scene of a stolen car. The teenager reportedly was left bleeding for more than an hour, and was dead before an ambulance arrived; over the next three days, 31 police cars and 10 fire department vehicles were damaged or destroyed, and 146 rioters were arrested, 42 of whom were injured in the process, including 10 who were shot by the police.
- Two U.S. Marine jets mistakenly bombed a village in the mountains of South Vietnam's Quảng Ngãi Province, killing 28 Montagnard civilians and wounding 17 others. During the war, the Montagnards were staunch allies of the American fight against the Viet Cong.
- Born: Stephanie Wilson, American engineer and astronaut; in Boston

== September 28, 1966 (Wednesday) ==
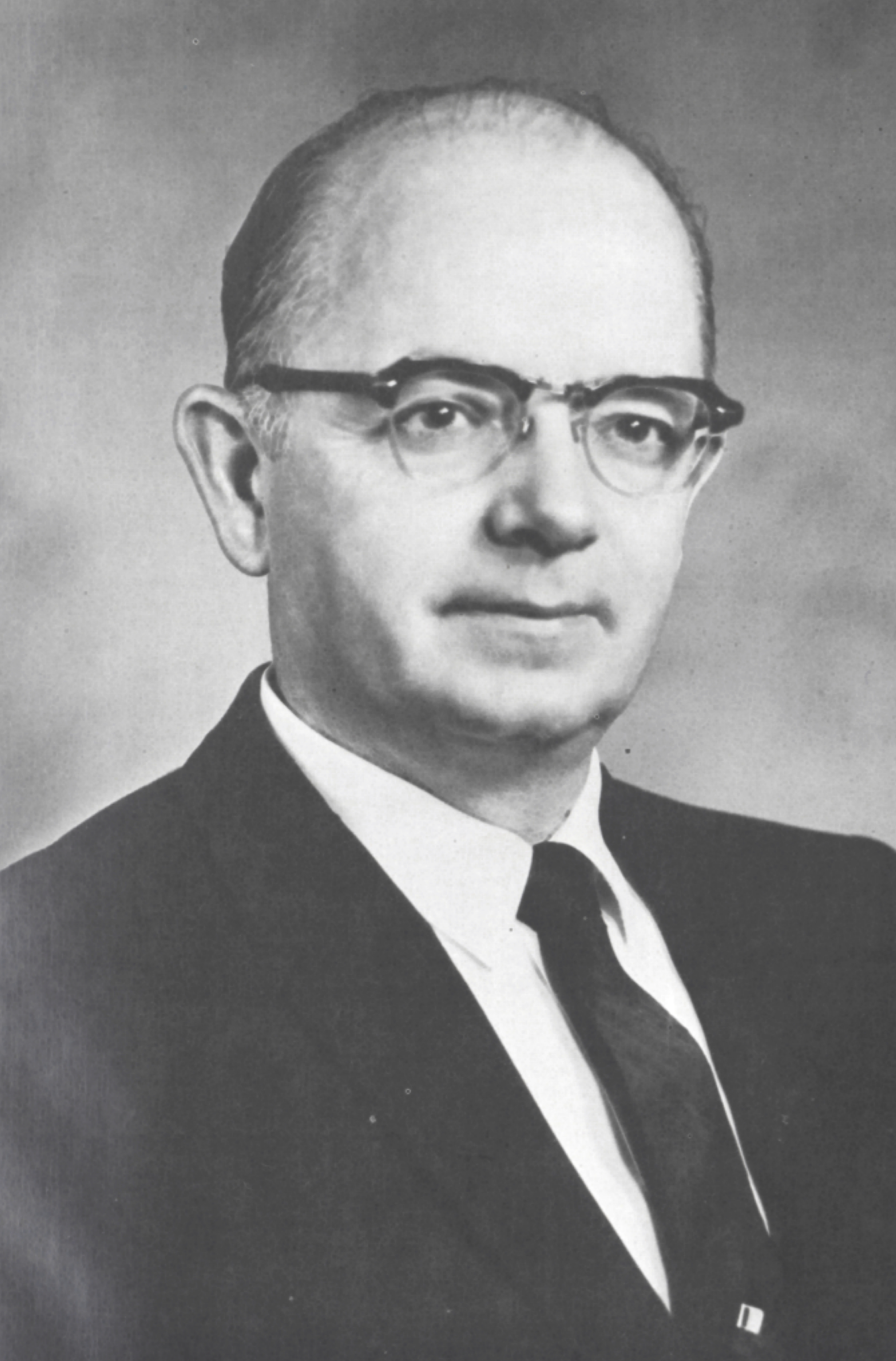
Maddox

- Lester G. Maddox, a restaurant operator and a hardline supporter of racial segregation, scored a surprise victory in a runoff election to determine the Democratic nomination for Governor of Georgia, a guarantee of the governorship in the state when there were few Republican voters. The win was seen as an upset, because Maddox's opponent, former Governor Ellis Arnall, had finished ahead of Maddox while running on a liberal platform, with a plurality of the votes in the September 14 primary.
- Dardo Cabo and Maria Christina Varrier led the hijacking of Aerolíneas Argentinas Flight 648 en route from Buenos Aires to the resort of Río Gallegos. Of the 32 passengers on board, 19 were members of the extremist group "Operativo Cóndor", who diverted the plane to land on a horse racing track in Stanley, Falkland Islands, where they took several islanders hostage before addressing an assembled crowd to denounce British administration of the islands. According to reports later, the mostly British crowd "found the ceremony entertaining, although few of them spoke Spanish." After 36 hours, the hijackers freed the hostages and surrendered to a Roman Catholic priest who gave them sanctuary in St. Mary's Church. They were extradited to Argentina on 1 October.
- Gunmen in Argentina fired machine guns at the British ambassador's residence in Buenos Aires while Prince Philip, the husband of Queen Elizabeth II, was preparing for a dinner held for the diplomats of the British Commonwealth embassies. According to Argentine press reports, an extremist group planned to kidnap Prince Philip, with the ransom being the Falkland Islands, claimed by Argentina, but governed as a British colony since 1833.

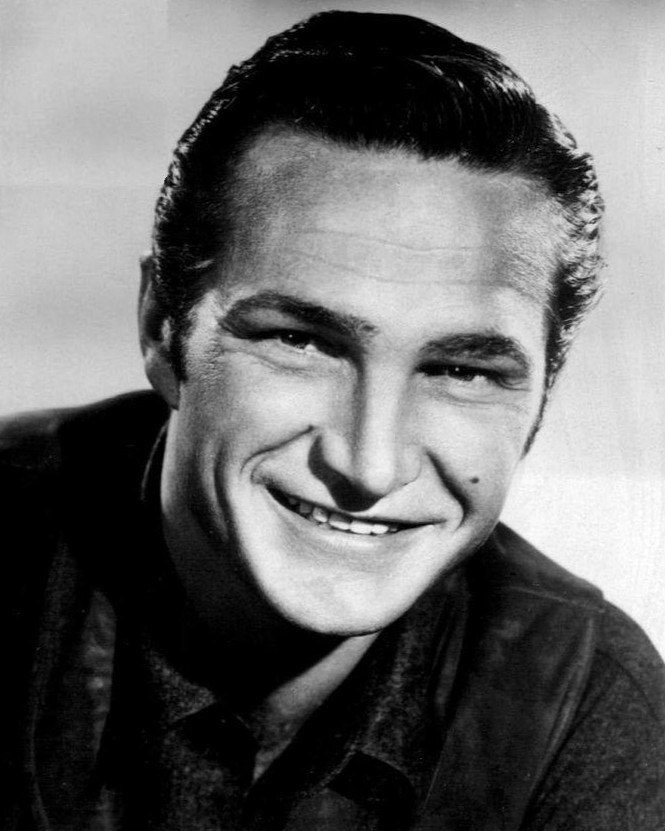
Eric Fleming

- Died:
  - Eric Fleming, 41, an American actor who had starred in the television western Rawhide, drowned while paddling a canoe on the Huallaga River in Peru. He was in the Leoncio Prado Province, near Tingo María, where he was filming the pilot for an ABC adventure series, High Jungle. His body, partially consumed by piranhas, would not be located until October 3.
  - Allen Redstone, 6, an Australian schoolboy who was kidnapped and murdered, having disappeared the previous day. Redston's assailant was never caught and Redstone's murder remains an infamous cold case in Canberra to this day.
  - Lillian Smith, 68, American author from the Deep South known for her bestselling and controversial interracial romance, Strange Fruit, in 1944
  - Charles Lawrence Bishop, 90, who served in the Senate of Canada since from 1945, died five days after his resignation.
  - André Breton, 70, French surrealist writer, and author of the First Surrealist Manifesto in 1924.

== September 29, 1966 (Thursday) ==
- "Black Thursday" marked the beginning of a five-day-long massacre of Igbo refugees who had fled the Eastern Region of Nigeria to the Northern Region, where the Hausa residents, with attacks against merchants, civil servants and civilians. At least 1,000 people were slaughtered before the central government stepped in, with 300 Ibos killed in the city of Kano. Other estimates place the death toll at 30,000.
- The Chevrolet Camaro, one of the most popular sports cars in the United States, went on sale at Chevrolet dealerships nationwide. The name itself, according to a Chevrolet press release was "a French word meaning comrade, pal or buddy", adapted from the French camarade.
- Hurricane Inez made landfall on the island of Hispaniola, hitting Haiti and the Dominican Republic. More than 1,000 Haitian people were killed and another 60,000 were left homeless.
- The Malta Workers' Union was founded, under the name "Malta Government Clerical Union" (MGCU).
- Born: Bujar Nishani, President of Albania from 2012 to 2017; in Durrës (d.2022)
- Died: Bernard Gimbel, 81, American department store magnate who built a chain of 52 upscale Saks Fifth Avenue and Gimbels stores

== September 30, 1966 (Friday) ==
Botswana, formerly Bechuanaland

- The Republic of Botswana, formerly the Bechuanaland Protectorate, was granted independence from the United Kingdom. Sir Seretse Khama was sworn in as the first President of Botswana. The nation remains "the oldest democracy on the continent of Africa".
- The Times, the London newspaper that had been publishing since 1785, was acquired by the publishing empire operated by Roy Thomson, 1st Baron Thomson of Fleet, a Canadian-born multimillionaire who had been elevated to the nobility in 1964.
