= Halleophyton =

Halleophyton Temporal range: Early Devonian

Scientific classification
- Kingdom: Plantae
- Clade: Tracheophytes
- Clade: Lycophytes
- Class: Lycopodiopsida (?)
- Genus: †Halleophyton; C.S.Li & D.Edwards

Species
- H. zhichangense C.S.Li & D.Edwards

Extinct genus of spore-bearing plants

Halleophyton is a genus of extinct vascular plants of the Early Devonian (Pragian, around 410 million years ago). Fossils were first found in the Posongchong Formation of eastern Yunnan, China. The plant had leafy aerial stems. The leaf bases completely covered the stems forming rhomboidal to hexagonal patterns, except where spore-forming organs or sporangia were present where the leaves thinned out somewhat. The tapered undivided leaves curved inwards and appear to have had a central vein. The sporangia were mixed with leaves and were more-or-less circular in outline, consisting of two valves which split to release the spores. Halleophyton has similarities with Drepanophycus, but a lack of detailed knowledge of some features of that genus persuaded Li and Edwards to create a new genus for their specimens. Although considered to be related to the lycophytes, the exact placement of the genus was left open by its authors. Hao and Xue in 2013 listed the genus as a lycopsid.
