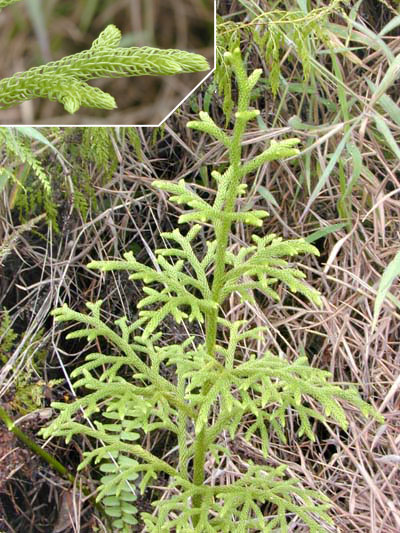
- Palhinhaea cernua with close-up of branch

Scientific classification
- Kingdom: Plantae
- Clade: Tracheophytes
- Clade: Lycophytes
- Class: Lycopodiopsida; Bartl.

Orders
- Isoetales (quillworts); Lycopodiales (clubmosses, firmosses); Selaginellales (spikemosses); †Lepidodendrales (arborecent lycophytes/scale trees)

Synonyms
- See Table 1.

= Lycopodiopsida =

Lycopodiopsida Temporal range: Devonian–Recent

Class of vascular plants

Lycopodiopsida is a class of vascular plants also known as lycopsids, lycopods, or lycophytes. Members of the class are also called clubmosses, firmosses, spikemosses and quillworts. They have dichotomously branching stems bearing simple leaves called microphylls and reproduce by means of spores borne in sporangia on the sides of the stems at the bases of the leaves. Although living species are small, during the Carboniferous, extinct tree-like forms (Lepidodendrales) formed huge forests that dominated the landscape and contributed to coal deposits.

The nomenclature and classification of plants with microphylls varies substantially among authors. A consensus classification for extant (living) species was produced in 2016 by the Pteridophyte Phylogeny Group (PPG I), which places them all in the class Lycopodiopsida, which includes the classes Isoetopsida and Selaginellopsida used in other systems. (See Table 2.) Alternative classification systems have used ranks from division (phylum) to subclass. In the PPG I system, the class is divided into three orders, Lycopodiales, Isoetales and Selaginellales.

== Characteristics ==
Club-mosses (Lycopodiales) are homosporous, but the genera Selaginella (spikemosses) and Isoetes (quillworts) are heterosporous, with female spores larger than the male. As a result of fertilisation, the female gametophyte produces sporophytes. A few species of Selaginella such as S. apoda and S. rupestris are also viviparous; the gametophyte develops on the mother plant, and only when the sporophyte's primary shoot and root is developed enough for independence is the new plant dropped to the ground. Many club-moss gametophytes are mycoheterotrophic and long-lived, residing underground for several years before emerging from the ground and progressing to the sporophyte stage.

Lycopodiaceae and spikemosses (Selaginella) are the only vascular plants with biflagellate sperm, an ancestral trait in land plants otherwise only seen in bryophytes. The only exceptions are Isoetes and Phylloglossum, which independently has evolved multiflagellated sperm cells with approximately 20 flagella (sperm flagella in other vascular plants can count at least thousand at most, but the number is generally much lower, and flagella are completely absent in seed plants except for Ginkgo and cycads). Because only two flagella puts a size limit on the genome, the largest known genomes in the clade are in Isoetes, as multiflagellated sperm is not exposed for the same selection pressure as biflagellate sperm in regard to size.

== Taxonomy ==
=== Phylogeny ===
The extant lycophytes are vascular plants (tracheophytes) with microphyllous leaves, distinguishing them from the euphyllophytes (plants with megaphyllous leaves). The sister group of the extant lycophytes and their closest extinct relatives are generally believed to be the zosterophylls, a paraphyletic or plesion group. Ignoring some smaller extinct taxa, the evolutionary relationships are as shown below.

- tracheophytes (vascular plants)
  - lycophytes (broadly defined)
    - †zosterophylls
      (multiple branches, incertae sedis)
    - lycopodiopsida
      living lycophytes and
      their extinct close relatives
  - euphyllophytes
    - ferns & horsetails
    - spermatophytes
      (seed plants)

As of 2019, there was broad agreement, supported by both molecular and morphological evidence, that the extant lycophytes fell into three groups, treated as orders in PPG I, and that these, both together and individually, are monophyletic, being related as shown in the cladogram below:

- extant lycophytes
  - Lycopodiales
  - - Isoetales
    - Selaginellales

=== Classification ===
The rank and name used for the taxon holding the extant lycophytes (and their closest extinct relatives) varies widely. Table 1 below shows some of the highest ranks that have been used. Systems may use taxa at a rank lower than the highest given in the table with the same circumscription; for example, a system that uses Lycopodiophyta as the highest ranked taxon may place all of its members in a single subclass.

Table 1: Alternative highest ranks used which include only extant species and their closest relatives
Highest rank	Name	Example sources
Division (phylum)	Lycophyta	Taylor et al. (2009), Mauseth (2014)
Division (phylum)	Lycopodiophyta	Niklas (2016)
Subdivision (subphylum)	Lycopodiophytina	Ruggiero et al. (2015)
Class	Lycopsida	Kenrick & Crane (1997)
Class	Lycopodiopsida	PPG I (2016)
Subclass	Lycopodiidae	Chase & Reveal (2009)

Some systems use a higher rank for a more broadly defined taxon of lycophytes that includes some extinct groups more distantly related to extant lycophytes, such as the zosterophylls. For example, Kenrick & Crane (1997) use the subdivision Lycophytina for this purpose, with all extant lycophytes falling within the class Lycopsida. Other sources exclude the zosterophylls from any "lycophyte" taxon.

In the Pteridophyte Phylogeny Group classification of 2016 (PPG I), the three orders are placed in a single class, Lycopodiopsida, holding all extant lycophyte species. Older systems have used either three classes, one for each order, or two classes, recognizing the closer relationship between Isoetales and Selaginellales. In these cases, a higher ranked taxon is needed to contain the classes (see Table 1). As Table 2 shows, the names "Lycopodiopsida" and "Isoetopsida" are both ambiguous.

Table 2: Alternative arrangements of the orders of extant lycophytes into classes
Order	3 classes e.g. IUCN Red List, 2004	2 classes e.g. Yatsentyuk et al. (2001)	1 class PPG I
Lycopodiales	Lycopodiopsida	Lycopodiopsida	Lycopodiopsida
Isoetales	Isoetopsida	Isoetopsida	Lycopodiopsida
Selaginellales	Sellaginellopsida	Isoetopsida	Lycopodiopsida

=== Subdivisions ===
The PPG I system divides up the extant lycophytes as shown below.

- Class Lycopodiopsida Bartl. (3 orders)

- Order Lycopodiales DC. ex Bercht. & J.Presl (1 extant family)

- Family Lycopodiaceae P.Beauv. (16 extant genera)

- Order Isoetales Prantl (1 extant family)

- Family Isoetaceae Dumort. (1 extant genus)

- Order Selaginellales Prantl (1 extant family)

- Family Selaginellaceae Willk (1 extant genus)

Some extinct groups, such as zosterophylls, fall outside the limits of the taxon as defined by the classifications in Table 1 above. However, other extinct groups fall within some circumscriptions of this taxon. Taylor et al. (2009) and Mauseth (2014) include a number of extinct orders in their division (phylum) Lycophyta, although they differ on the placement of some genera. The orders included by Taylor et al. are:

- Order †Drepanophycales (including Baragwanathia, Drepanophycus and Asteroxylon)
- Order †Protolepidodendrales
- Order †Lepidodendrales
- Order †Pleuromeiales

Mauseth uses the order †Asteroxylales, placing Baragwanathia in the Protolepidodendrales.

The relationship between some of these extinct groups and the extant ones was investigated by Kenrick and Crane in 1997. When the genera they used are assigned to orders, their suggested relationship is:

- - †Drepanophycales (†Asteroxylon, †Baragwanathia, †Drepanophycus)
  - - Lycopodiales
    - - †Protolepidodendrales (†Leclercqia, †Minarodendron)
      - - Selaginellales (Selaginella, including subg. Stachygynandrum and subg. Tetragonostachys)
        - - Isoetales (Isoetes)
          - †Lepidodendrales (†Paralycopodites)

== Evolution ==
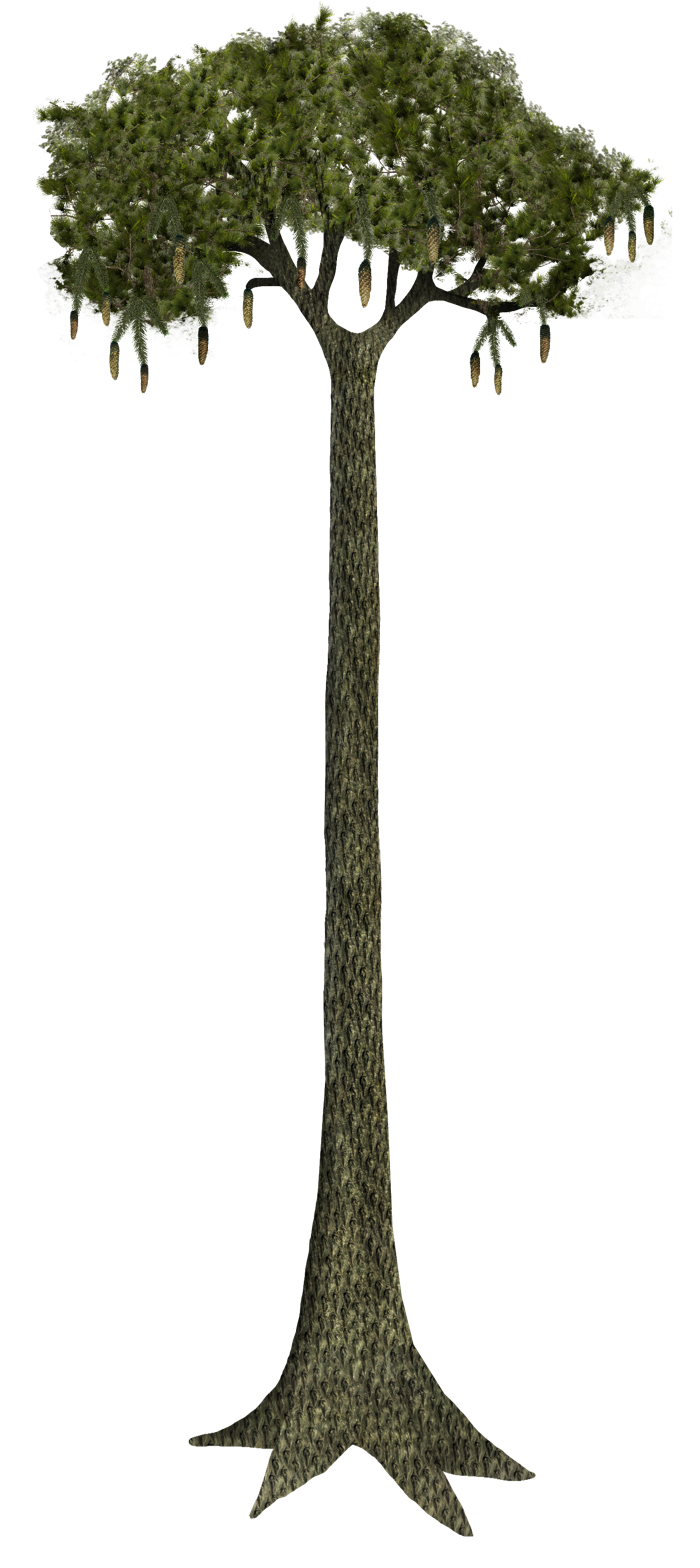
Artist's impression of a Lepidodendron

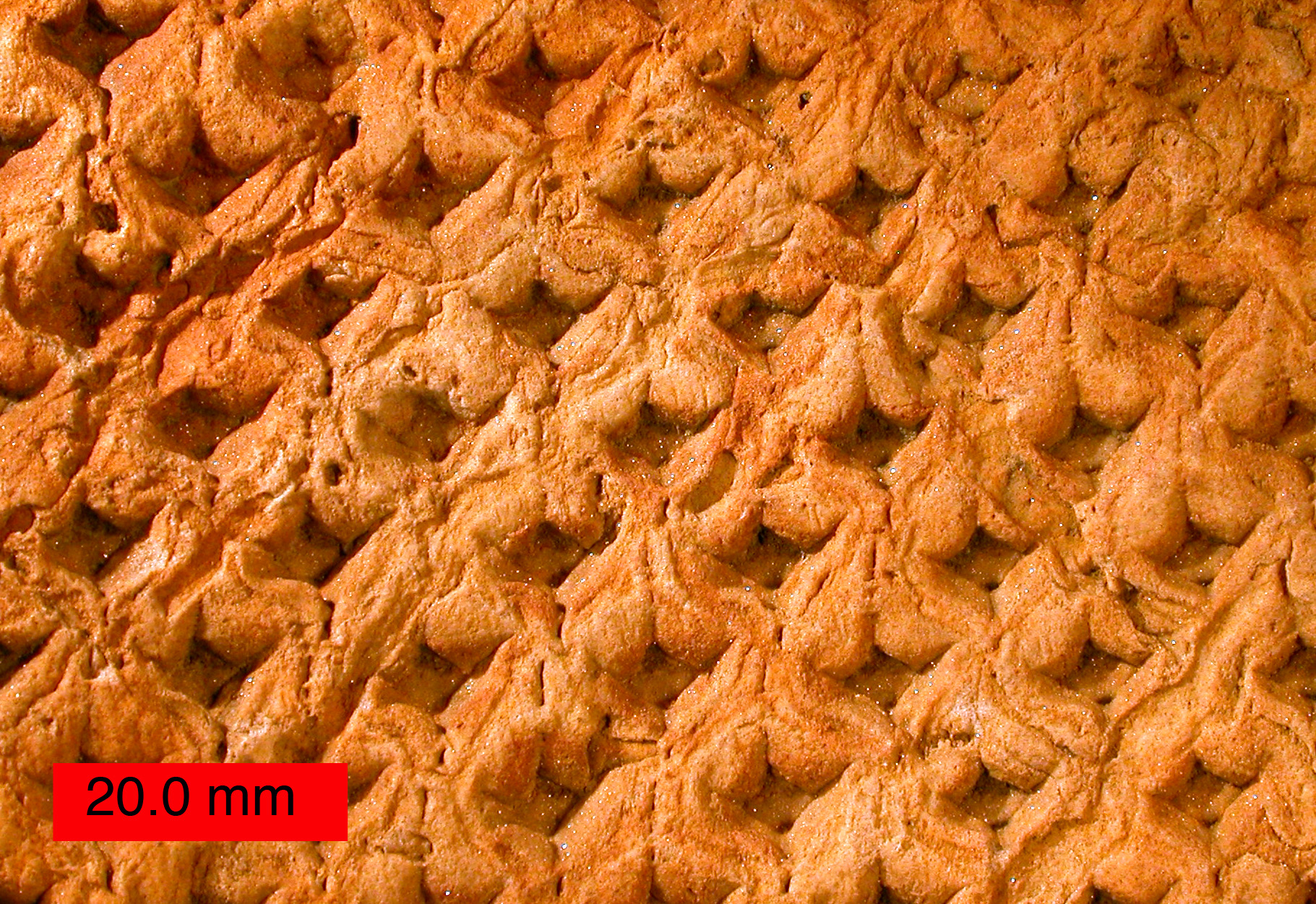
External impression of Lepidodendron from the Upper Carboniferous of Ohio

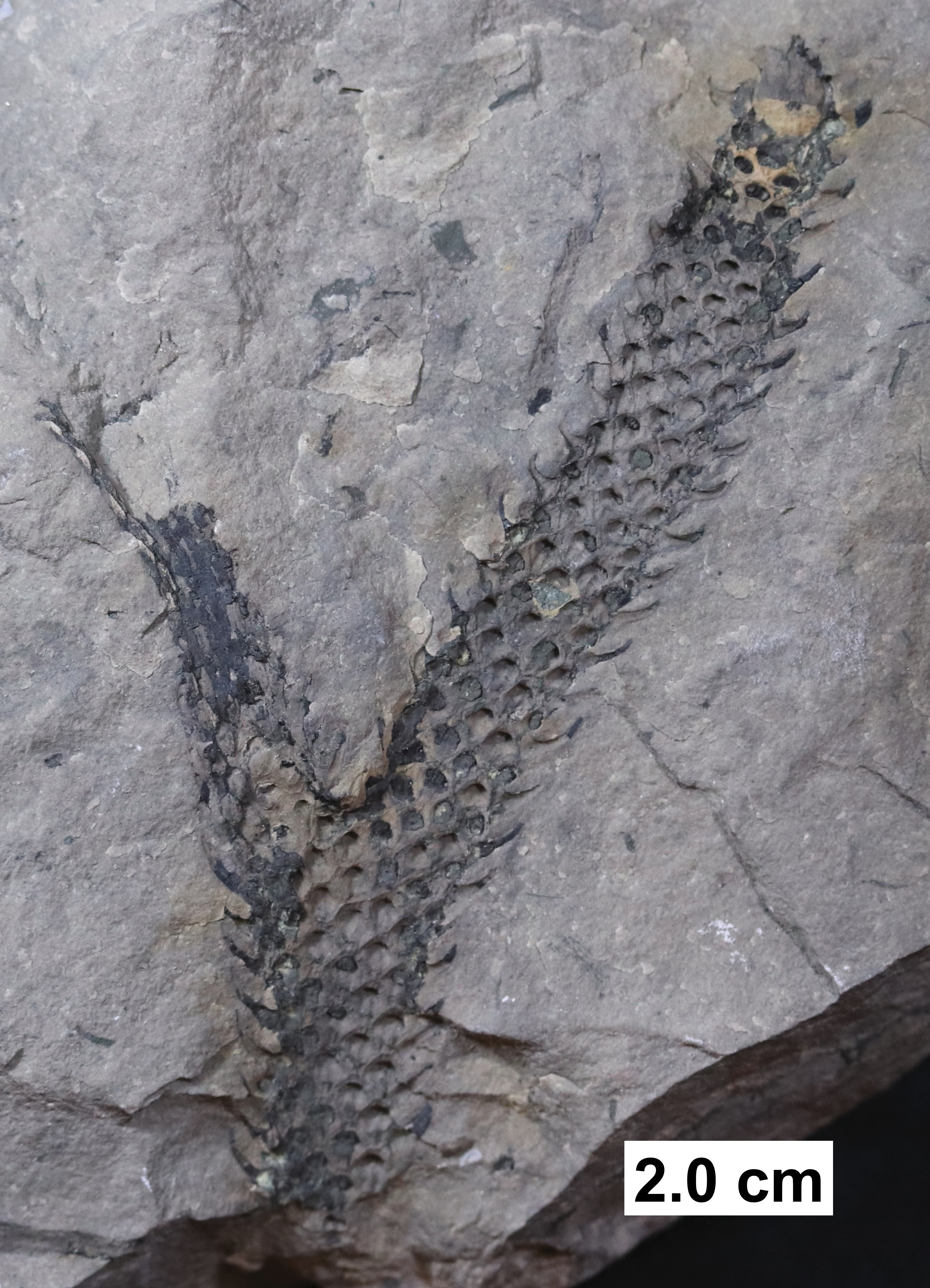
Axis (branch) from Archaeosigillaria or related lycopod from the Middle Devonian of Wisconsin

The Lycopodiopsida are distinguished from other vascular plants by the possession of microphylls and by their sporangia, which are lateral as opposed to terminal and which open (dehisce) transversely rather than longitudinally. In some groups, the sporangia are borne on sporophylls that are clustered into strobili. Phylogenetic analysis shows the group branching off at the base of the evolution of vascular plants and they have a long evolutionary history. Fossils are abundant worldwide, especially in coal deposits. Fossils that can be ascribed to the Lycopodiopsida first appear in the Silurian period, along with a number of other vascular plants. The Silurian Baragwanathia longifolia is one of the earliest identifiable species. Lycopodolica is another Silurian genus which appears to be an early member of this group. The group evolved roots independently from the rest of the vascular plants.

From the Devonian onwards, some species grew large and tree-like. Devonian fossil lycopsids from Svalbard, growing in equatorial regions, raise the possibility that they drew down enough carbon dioxide to change the Earth's climate significantly. During the Carboniferous, tree-like plants (such as Lepidodendron, Sigillaria, and other extinct genera of the order Lepidodendrales) formed huge forests that dominated the landscape. Unlike modern trees, leaves grew out of the entire surface of the trunk and branches, but fell off as the plant grew, leaving only a small cluster of leaves at the top. The lycopsids had distinctive features such as Lepidodendron lycophytes, which were marked with diamond-shaped scars where they once had leaves. Quillworts (order Isoetales) and Selaginella are considered their closest extant relatives and share some unusual features with these fossil lycopods, including the development of both bark, cambium and wood, a modified shoot system acting as roots, bipolar and secondary growth, and an upright stance. The remains of Lepidodendron lycopods formed many fossil coal deposits. In Fossil Grove, Victoria Park, Glasgow, Scotland, fossilized lycophytes can be found in sandstone.

The Lycopodiopsida had their maximum diversity in the Pennsylvanian (Upper Carboniferous), particularly tree-like Lepidodendron and Sigillaria that dominated tropical wetlands. The complex ecology of these tropical rainforests collapsed during the Middle Pennsylvanian due to a change in climate. In Euramerica, tree-like species apparently became extinct in the Late Pennsylvanian, as a result of a transition to a much drier climate, giving way to conifers, ferns and horsetails. In Cathaysia (now South China), tree-like species survived into the Permian. Nevertheless, lycopodiopsids are rare in the Lopingian (latest Permian), but regained dominance in the Induan (earliest Triassic), particularly Pleuromeia. After the worldwide Permian–Triassic extinction event, members of this group pioneered the repopulation of habitats as opportunistic plants. The heterogeneity of the terrestrial plant communities increased markedly during the Middle Triassic when plant groups like horsetails, ferns, pteridosperms, cycads, ginkgos and conifers resurfaced and diversified quickly.

== Microbial associations ==
Lycophytes form associations with microbes such as fungi and bacteria, including arbuscular mycorrhizal and endophytic associations.

Arbuscular mycorrhizal associations have been characterized in all stages of the lycophyte lifecycle: mycoheterotrophic gametophyte, photosynthetic surface-dwelling gametophyte, young sporophyte, and mature sporophyte. Arbuscular mycorrhizae have been found in Selaginella spp. roots and vesicles.

During the mycoheterotrophic gametophyte lifecycle stage, lycophytes gain all of their carbon from subterranean glomalean fungi. In other plant taxa, glomalean networks transfer carbon from neighboring plants to mycoheterotrophic gametophytes. Something similar could be occurring in Huperzia hypogeae gametophytes which associate with the same glomalean phenotypes as nearby Huperzia hypogeae sporophytes.

Fungal endophytes have been found in many species of lycophyte, however the function of these endophytes in host plant biology is not known. Endophytes of other plant taxa perform roles such as improving plant competitive fitness, conferring biotic and abiotic stress tolerance, promoting plant growth through phytohormone production or production of limiting nutrients. However, some endophytic fungi in lycophytes do produce medically relevant compounds. Shiraia sp Slf14 is an endophytic fungus present in Huperzia serrata that produces Huperzine A, a biomedical compound which has been approved as a drug in China and a dietary supplement in the U.S. to treat Alzheimer's disease. This fungal endophyte can be cultivated much more easily and on a much larger scale than H. serrata itself which could increase the availability of Huperzine A as a medicine.

== Uses ==
The spores of lycopods are highly flammable and so have been used in fireworks. Lycopodium powder, the dried spores of the common clubmoss, was used in Victorian theater to produce flame effects. A blown cloud of spores burned rapidly and brightly, but with little heat. (It was considered safe by the standards of the time.)

== See also ==
- Clevelandodendron
- Lepidodendrales
- Isoetales
