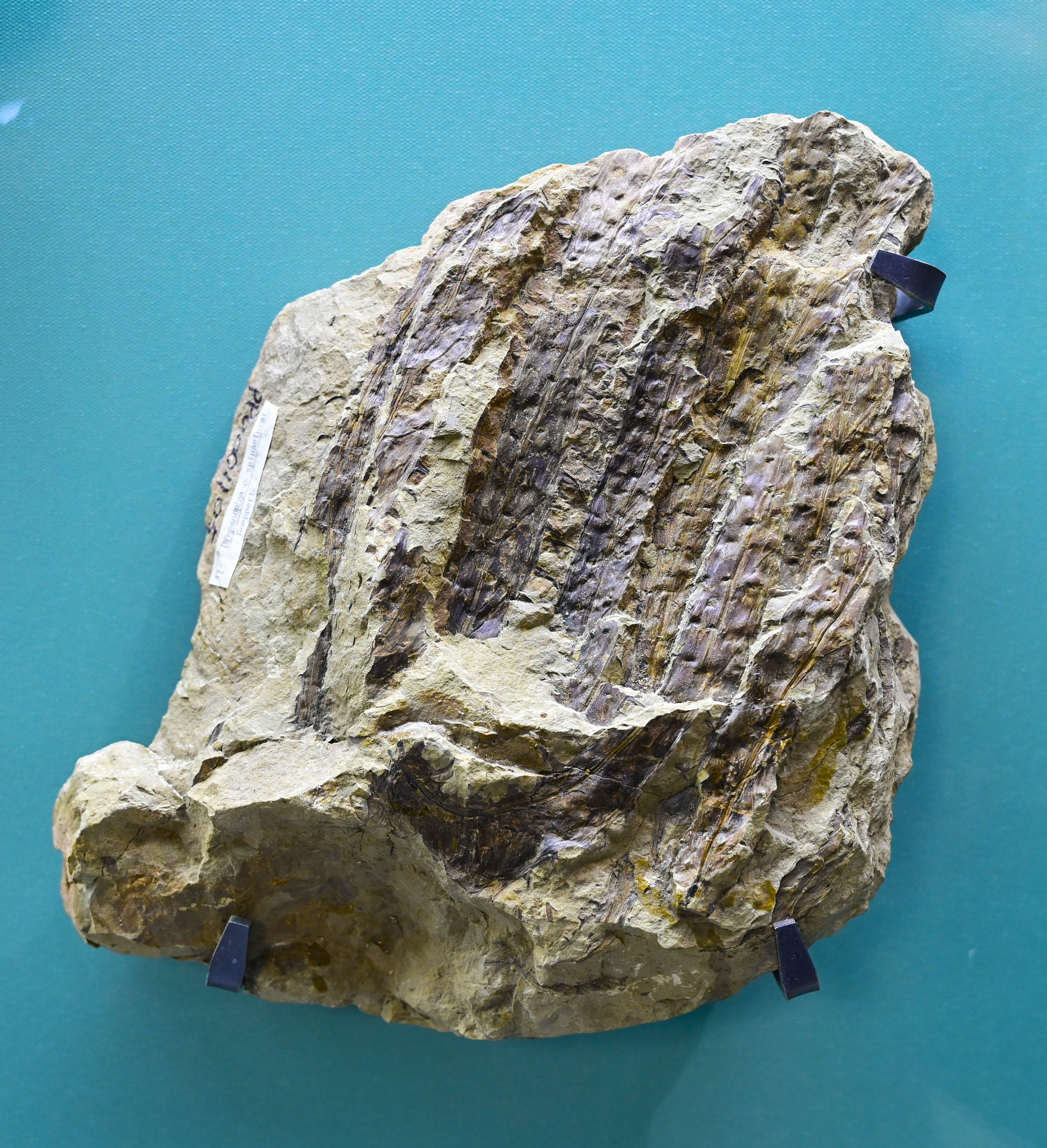
- Fossil specimen, National Natural History Museum of China

Scientific classification
- Kingdom: Plantae
- Clade: Tracheophytes
- Clade: Lycophytes
- Order: †Drepanophycales
- Family: †Drepanophycaceae
- Genus: †Drepanophycus; Göpp., 1852

Species
- Drepanophycus spinaeformis Göpp. (Type species); Drepanophycus crepini (Gilkinet); Drepanophycus qujingensis C.S.Li & D.Edwards; Drepanophycus gaspianus (Dawson) Kräusel & Weyland; Drepanophycus spinosus; Another species has been described: Drepanophycus colophyllus Grierson & Banks - but this has since been removed to the genus Haskinsia.

= Drepanophycus =

Drepanophycus Temporal range: Devonian: Lochkovian - Frasnian

Extinct genus of spore-bearing plants

Drepanophycus is a genus of extinct plants of the division Lycopodiophyta of Early to Late Devonian age (around 420 to 370 million years ago), found in Eastern Canada and Northeast US, China, Russia, Egypt and various parts of Northern Europe and Britain.

== Description ==
Extinct terrestrial vascular plants of the Devonian period. Stem of the order of several mm to several cm in diameter and several cm to a metre long, erect or arched, dichotomizing occasionally, furnished with true roots at the base. Vascular bundle actinostele, tracheids of primitive annular or helical type (so-called G-type). Leaves are unbranched thorn-shaped (i.e. with a wide base, tapering to a blunt point) microphylls several mm long with a single prominent vascular thread, arranged spirally to randomly on the stem. Sporangia borne singly on the upper leaf surface.

Drepanophycus has similarities to the genus Halleophyton. It differs from a closely related genus of the same period, Baragwanathia, in the position of the sporangia, and the arrangement and shape of the leaves; see Drepanophycaceae for more details. It is more derived than the coexisting genus Asteroxylon, which has enations lacking vascules, in contrast to the true leaves of Drepanophycus.

Drepanophycus spinaeformis was first discovered in Scotland; fossils have since been recovered in Russia (around Lake Shunet in the republic of Khakassia), in the Yunnan province of the People's Republic of China, and in Egypt. They were among the earliest land plants, growing to approximately 80 cm in height. The species is notably differentiated from other plants in the genus by its thicker stems. Foliage is described as firm and spiny, though recovered fossils rarely retain leaf detail. The stomata of D. spinaeformis look similar to that of Lycopodium japonicum. They both consist of two large guard cells and pore, and are anomocytic. There were two small guard cells surrounded by two large similarly shaped subsidiary cells (paracytic) deriving from a pronounced elliptical cuticular ledge on the surface of the guard cells surrounding a thickened circumpolar area.

Complex underground rhizome systems of Drepanophycus have been reported from Yunnan's Xujiachong Formation (Early Devonian); these are the earliest rooted paleosols in Asia, and predate the first trees with deep roots by 20 million years.
