= Lycopodolica =

Lycopodolica Temporal range: Late Silurian

Scientific classification
- Kingdom: Plantae
- Clade: Tracheophytes
- Clade: Lycophytes
- Class: Lycopodiopsida
- Genus: †Lycopodolica; T.A. Ishchenko

Species
- L. tsegelnjucki T.A. Ishchenko

Extinct genus of spore-bearing plants

Lycopodolica is a genus of extinct plants of the Late Silurian (Přídolí, around 430 to 420 million years ago). Fossils were found in the Rashkov Beds in Podolia in modern Ukraine. Plants there are preserved as compressions without internal detail. Lycopodolica had stems (axes) which appear to have branched and which are covered with lax, hair- or thread-like outgrowths. Considered to be a lycophyte, Lycopodolica differs from Baragwanathia in the nature of its outgrowths or enations. It was listed as a lycopsid by Hao and Xue in 2013.
