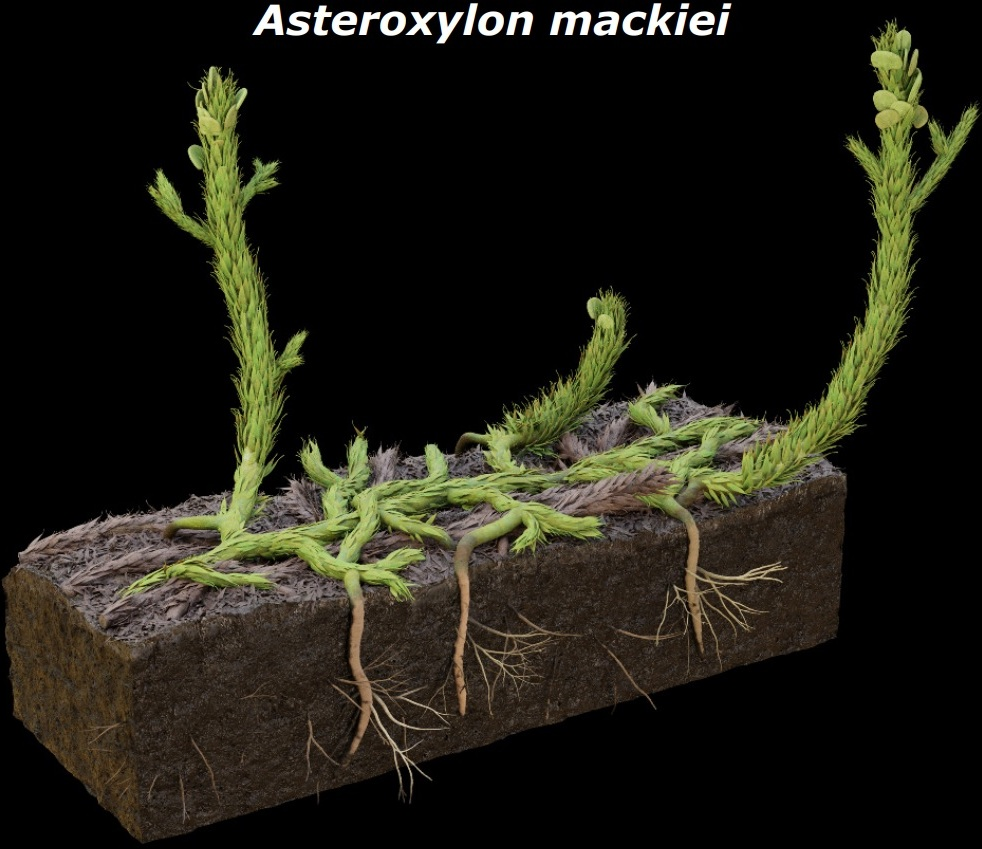
- Life restoration

Scientific classification
- Kingdom: Plantae
- Clade: Tracheophytes
- Clade: Lycophytes
- Order: †Drepanophycales
- Family: †Asteroxylaceae; Kidston & Lang
- Genus: †Asteroxylon; Kidston & Lang 1920

Type species
- Asteroxylon mackiei Kidston & Lang

= Asteroxylon =

Asteroxylon Temporal range: Early Devonian

Extinct genus of spore-bearing plants

Asteroxylon ("star-shaped wood") is an extinct genus of vascular plants of the Division Lycopodiophyta known from anatomically preserved specimens described from the famous Early Devonian Rhynie chert and Windyfield chert in Aberdeenshire, Scotland. Asteroxylon is considered a basal member of the Lycopsida.

== Description ==
Asteroxylon is a genus of terrestrial vascular plant which flourished in the Early Devonian period. This plant consisted of aerial, isotomously and anisotomously branching stems that reached 12 mm in diameter and 40 cm in length. The possibly procumbent aerial stems arose from a leaf-less rhizome which bore smaller-diameter, positively geotropic root-like branches. The rhizomes, which represent an independent origin of roots, reached a depth of up to 20 cm below the surface. A 407 million-year-old fossil from the Rhynie chert shows the roots formed through a modified version of a mechanism called “dichotomous branching”, where one of the branches that formed from a shoot-like axis buried into the soil. This method of root formation no longer exists. The xylem or conducting tissue at the center of the aerial stems is distinctly star-shaped in cross-section and has been considered an early actinostele or an "Asteroxylon-type" protostele. The tracheids are of the primitive annular or helical type (so-called G-type). "Leaves" – not true leaves, but protrusions – were of the form of unbranched strap-shaped enations up to 5 mm long; a single vascular trace branched from the main bundle in the centre of the stem to terminate at the base of each enation. Enations and axes bore stomata, indicating that their tissues were capable of photosynthesis.

"Sporangia, consisting of two kidney-shaped valves, are interspersed among the nonvascularized leaflike appendages and attached to the axis with a short pedicel. The sporangia are curved and lie close to the axis." Fertile regions of the axes alternate with sterile regions, suggesting periodic episodes of fertility.

Asteroxylon differs from other similar Early Devonian lycopsids such as Drepanophycus and Baragwanathia in that the singular vascular leaf trace in these latter plants extends into the leaf. The leaves of Drepanophycus and Baragwanathia are therefore considered to be true microphylls or, alternatively, small leaves.

== Species ==
The type species is Asteroxylon mackiei. One other species has been described, Asteroxylon elberfeldense, but this is now considered to be generically distinct and assigned to Thursophyton. A fossil originally named as Asteroxylon setchellii is now considered to be a fern, and is known as Stenokoleos setchellii.

== Taxonomy ==
A 2021 reanalysis found that Asteroxylon was more closely related to crown lycophytes than the more basal zosterophylls and Nothia.

== See also ==
- Drepanophycales
- Devonian
- List of Early Devonian land plants
- Polysporangiophytes
