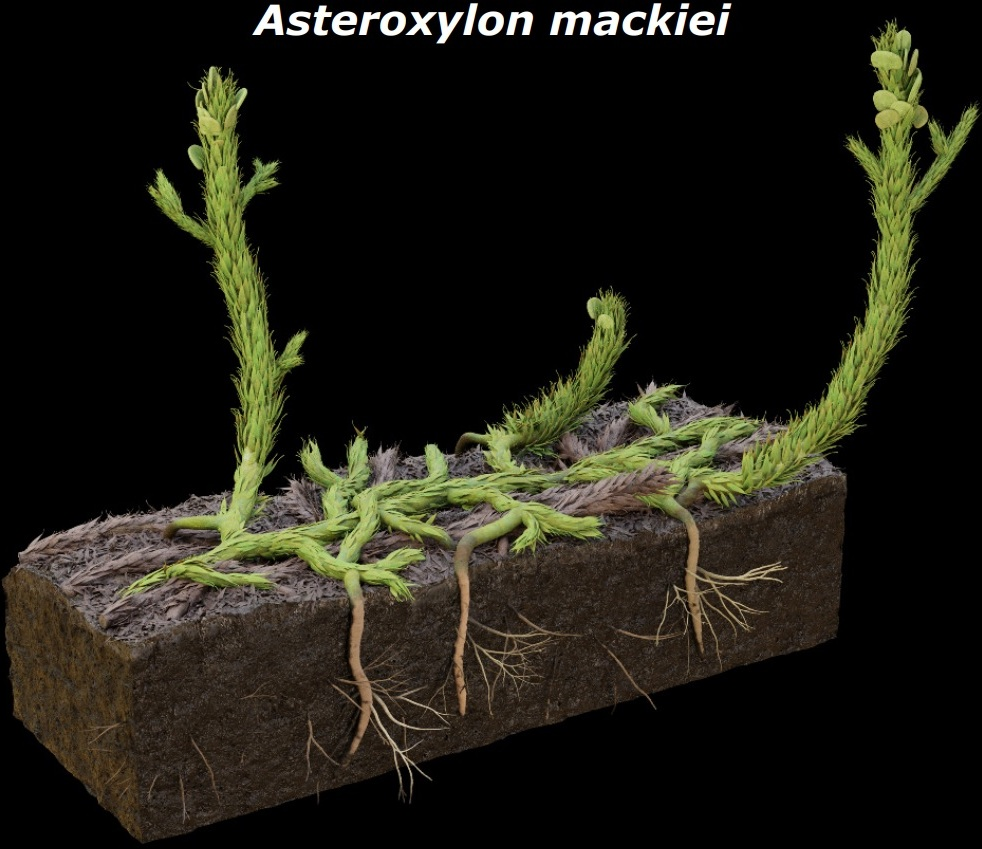
- Life restoration of Asteroxylon mackiei

Scientific classification
- Kingdom: Plantae
- Clade: Tracheophytes
- Clade: Lycophytes
- Order: †Drepanophycales; Novák, 1961

Families
- Asteroxylaceae; Drepanophycaceae

= Drepanophycales =

Drepanophycales Temporal range: late Silurian–Devonian

Extinct order of spore-bearing plants

Drepanophycales is an order of extinct lycophyte plants of Late Silurian to Late Devonian age (around 430 to 360 million years ago), found in North America, China, Russia, Europe, and Australia. Sometimes known as the Asteroxylales or Baragwanathiales.

== Description ==
Extinct terrestrial vascular plants of the Silurian to Devonian periods. Stem of the order of several mm to several cm in diameter and several cm to several metres long, erect or arched, dichotomizing occasionally, furnished with true roots at the base. Vascular bundle an exarch actinostele, tracheids of primitive annular or helical type (so-called G-type). Stem clothed in either microphylls (leaves with a single vascular thread or 'vein'), or with leaf-like enations (unvascularized projections) with a vascular trace into the base of each enation. Homosporous, with sporangia borne singly and dehiscing by a single slit.

== List of families ==
The following families have, at various times, been segregated within the Drepanophycales. However, Kenrick and Crane (1997) in their cladistic study place Asteroxylon in the clade Drepanophycaceae. Taylor, Taylor & Krings (2009) do not use the family at all, only the order Drepanophycales, and say that Asteroxylon is sometimes included in the Drepanophycales.

The anatomical details for the genera in the included families are tabulated by Gensel (1992)

- Drepanophycaceae Kräusel & Weyland
  - stem with microphylls
    - genus Drepanophycus Göppert
      - microphylls short, tapering rapidly from wide base (thorn-shaped)
      - microphylls arranged spirally or randomly on stem
      - sporangia borne on upper surface of microphylls
    - genus Baragwanathia Lang & Cookson
      - microphylls long, not tapering over most of length (strap-shaped)
      - microphylls arranged spirally on stem
      - sporangia borne axially (whether on microphylls or on stem is not known)
  - genus Sengelia Matsunaga & Tomescu
- Asteroxylaceae Kidston & Lang
  - stem with unvascularized enations
    - genus Asteroxylon Kidston & Lang

A large unnamed drepanophylacean is also known from the Early Devonian Hunsrück Slate of Germany.
