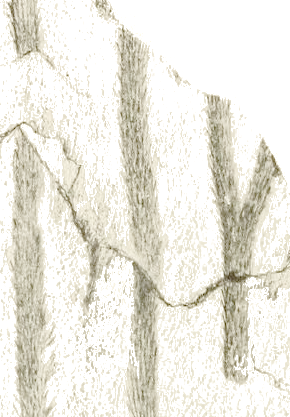
- Axes of Thursophyton milleri, detail from Nathorst (1915), Fig. 7

Scientific classification
- Kingdom: Plantae
- Clade: Tracheophytes
- Order: incertae sedis
- Genus: †Thursophyton; Nath. 1915

Type species
- Thursophyton milleri (J.W.Salter) Nath.

= Thursophyton =

Thursophyton Temporal range: Middle Devonian

Extinct genus of vascular plants

Thursophyton ("plant from Thurso") is a form genus of extinct vascular plants known from anatomically preserved specimens originally described from the Givetian (Middle Devonian) of Scotland, and since reported from other parts of northern Europe. The taxonomic position of Thursophyton has been uncertain; most authors have considered it too imperfectly known to place, or have assigned it to the Lycopodiophyta. Unpublished research suggests similarities with spiny genera of the Zosterophyllopsida.

== Description ==
Thursophyton is a genus of terrestrial vascular plants which flourished in the Middle Devonian period. These plants consisted of aerial stems branching dichotomously, trichotomously or pseudomonopodially, at least the main axes clothed in spirally arranged spines up to 7 mm long, which are not leaves as they are not vascularised and leave no scar when removed. The stems contain an elliptical exarch xylem having both annular and spirally thickened tracheids; very little is known about the sporangia.

== Species ==
The type species is Thursophyton milleri. Other species have been suggested (e.g. T. reidii, T. eberfeldense, T. hostimense, T. vahlbergianum) which are usually regarded as synonyms of T. milleri. Because of the poor preservation of much of this plant material from the Devonian period, it is likely that other synonyms exist e.g. Euthursophyton hamperbachense Mustafa from Germany.

== See also ==
- Devonian
