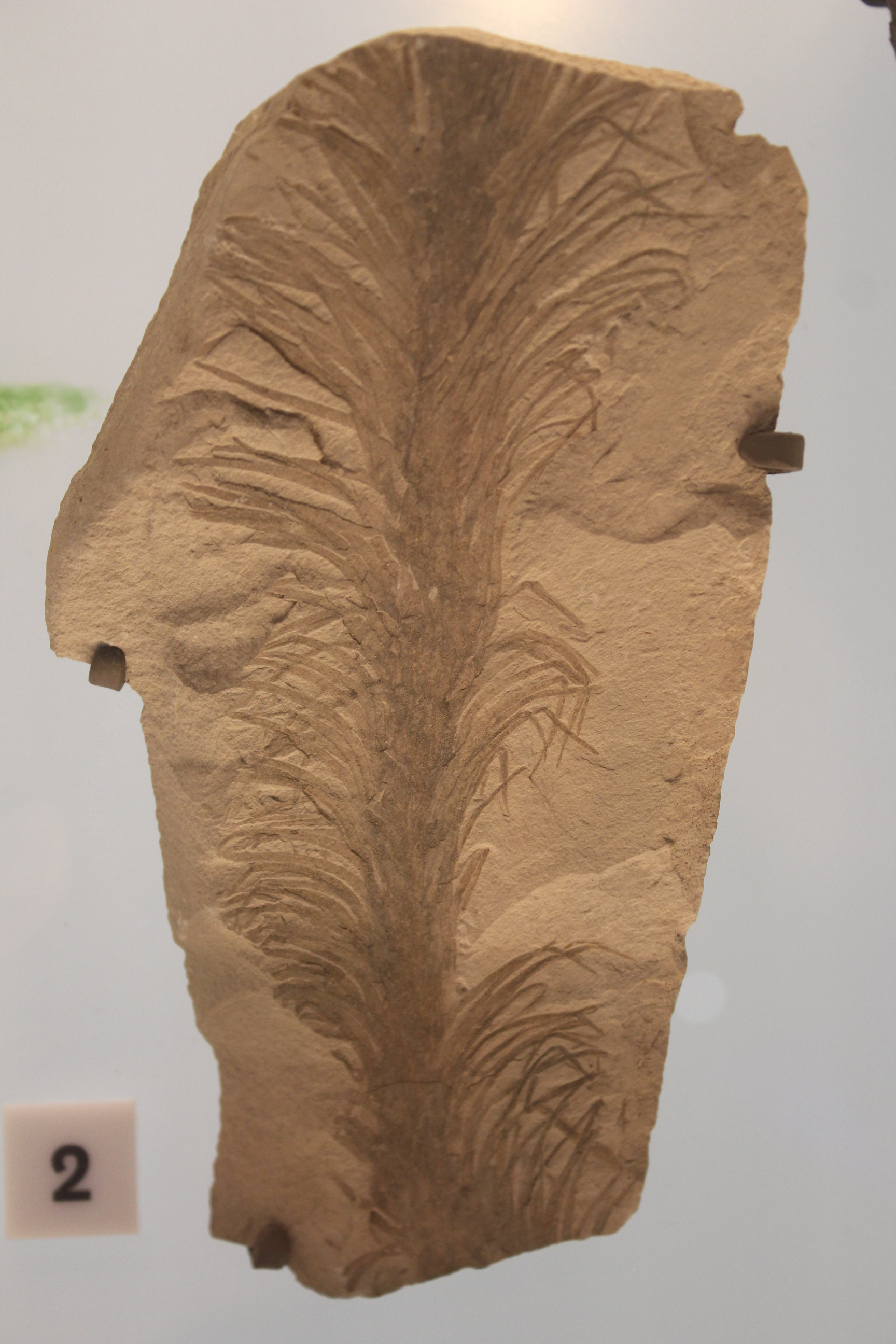
- B. longifolia fossil, National Museum of Natural History

Scientific classification
- Kingdom: Plantae
- Clade: Tracheophytes
- Clade: Lycophytes
- Order: †Drepanophycales
- Family: †Drepanophycaceae
- Genus: †Baragwanathia; W.H.Lang & Cookson, 1935

Species
- Baragwanathia longifolia W.H.Lang & Cookson (Type species); Baragwanathia abitibiensis Hueber; Baragwanathia brevifolia Kraft & Kvaček; Baragwanathia sp. Hao & Gensel

= Baragwanathia =

Baragwanathia Temporal range: Early Ludlow (Gorstian, late Silurian) - Early Devonian

Extinct genus of spore-bearing plants

Baragwanathia is a genus of extinct lycopsid plants of Late Silurian to Early Devonian age (427 to 393 million years ago), fossils of which have been found in Australia, Canada, China and Czechia. The name derives from William Baragwanath who discovered the first specimens of the type species, Baragwanathia longifolia, at Thomson River (Victoria, Australia).

== Description ==
Baragwanathia differed from such taxa as Asteroxylon by the presence of vascular tissue in its leaves—Asteroxylon had enations without vascular tissue. The sporangia were borne in the axils of the leaves, which were spirally arranged. By comparison, the closely related genus Drepanophycus of the same period (see Drepanophycaceae for more details) bore its sporangia on the upper surface of specialized leaves known as sporophylls. Baragwanathia varied in size, with stems up to a few cm in diameter and up to a few metres in length. They were erect or arched, dichotomized (forked) occasionally, and had adventitious roots arising directly from prostrate stems. As in Asteroxylon the vascular bundle in the stems was an exarch actinostele, with a star-shaped arrangement of tracheids of a primitive annular or helical type (so-called G-type). Leaves were unbranched strap-shaped microphylls (4 cm long in B. longifolia) with a single prominent vascular thread, arranged spirally on the stem. The sporangia were borne in the axils of the leaves, broader than long, dehiscing by a transversely orientated slit. Spores were trilete isospores. The gametophyte of Baragwanathia is currently unknown.

The species Baragwanathia brevifolia, described in 2017 from a single fossil specimen, had smaller microphylls than other species of Baragwanathia. It had marine species (bryozoans and brachiopods) attached to it, and apparently growing on it, showing that at least the lower part of the plant grew in marine water. As it is one of the oldest lycophyte fossils, the implication is that land-based lycophytes evolved from aquatic precursors.

== Age ==
The age of Baragwanathia has been uncertain because the fossils described by Lang and Cookson (1935) at first appeared to be of Late Silurian age, associated as they were with the graptolite genus Monograptus. This would make the species by far the most advanced known plant of the time. However, the Silurian (Ludlovian) dating of the deposit in Victoria, Australia which produced the type specimens of Baragwanathia longifolia was later disproved, as Monograptus (and in particular the species present at that site) was later proved to persist into the Early Devonian. Since then, specimens from a different Victorian locality have been found that occur with veritable Late Silurian graptolites. The species Baragwanathis brevifolia has been dated to the lower Pridoli, about 422 million years ago. The genus Baragwanathia persisted at least until the Emsian (Late Lower Devonian) and probably had a worldwide distribution.

== See also ==
- Yea Flora Fossil Site
- List of Early Devonian land plants
