= William Baragwanath =

William Baragwanath OBE
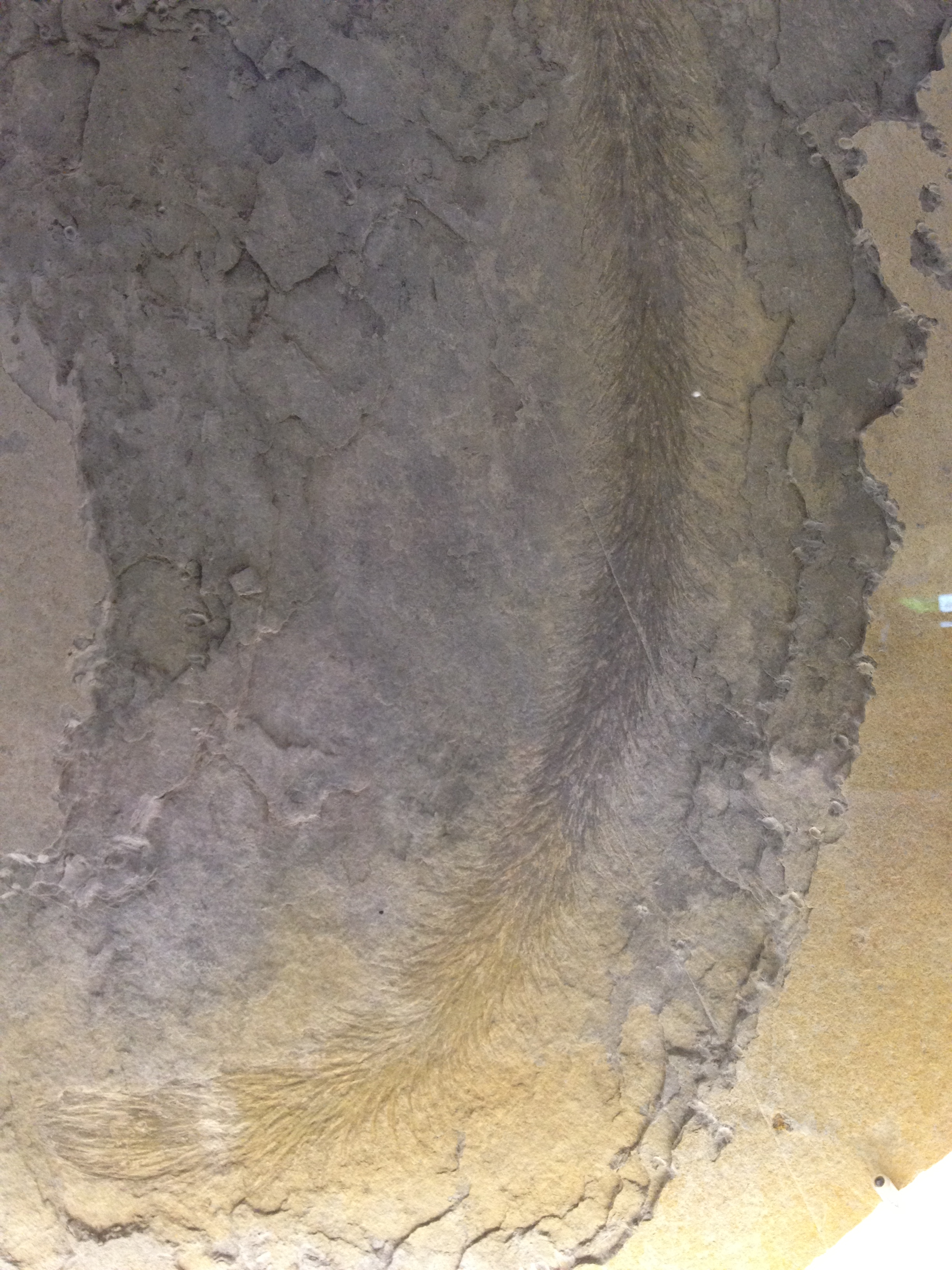
- Baragwanathia fossil
- Born: 1 August 1878; Durham Lead, Victoria, Australia
- Died: 20 September 1966 (aged 88); Prahran, Victoria, Australia
- Occupations: Geologist, surveyor

William Baragwanath OBE (1 August 1878 – 20 September 1966) was an Australian surveyor, geologist and public servant.

== Biography ==
The son of Cornish gold rush immigrants, Baragwanath was born in Ballarat in 1871 to William Baragwanath, a surveyor, and his wife Margaret Hunter. Baragwanath married Clara Ethel, née Jones, on 9 May 1900 at a Presbyterian Church in Flemington. Together they had nine children; seven girls and two boys.

Baragwanath earned his surveying credentials at the Ballarat School of Mines in 1903 and graduated with a certificate of Geology in 1911. In 1922, he was appointed director of the Geological Survey of Victoria, and in 1932 Secretary for Mines. He was exceptionally knowledgeable about the geology of the Australian state of Victoria and was instrumental in the expansion of the brown coal industry.

Baragwanath discovered fossils of Baragwanathia, a genus of extinct plants named in his honour by paleobotanist Isabel Cookson and at the time these were considered the most ancient land plant known.

Baragwanath was active in scientific organisations, sitting on the council of the Ballarat School of Mines (1916-1950), the Council for Scientific and Industrial Research (1920-1949) and was also President of the Royal Society of Victoria.

== Awards ==
In 1952 Baragwanath was appointed as an Officer of the Order of the British Empire. He was made a fellow of the Victorian Institute of Surveyors in 1958.
