= Microphylls and megaphylls =

Plant leaf type

In plant anatomy and evolution a microphyll (or lycophyll) is a type of plant leaf with one single, unbranched leaf vein. Plants with microphyll leaves occur early in the fossil record, and few such plants exist today. In the classical concept of a microphyll, the leaf vein emerges from the protostele without leaving a leaf gap. Leaf gaps are small areas above the node of some leaves where there is no vascular tissue, as it has all been diverted to the leaf. Megaphylls, in contrast, have multiple veins within the leaf and leaf gaps above them in the stem.

== Leaf vasculature ==
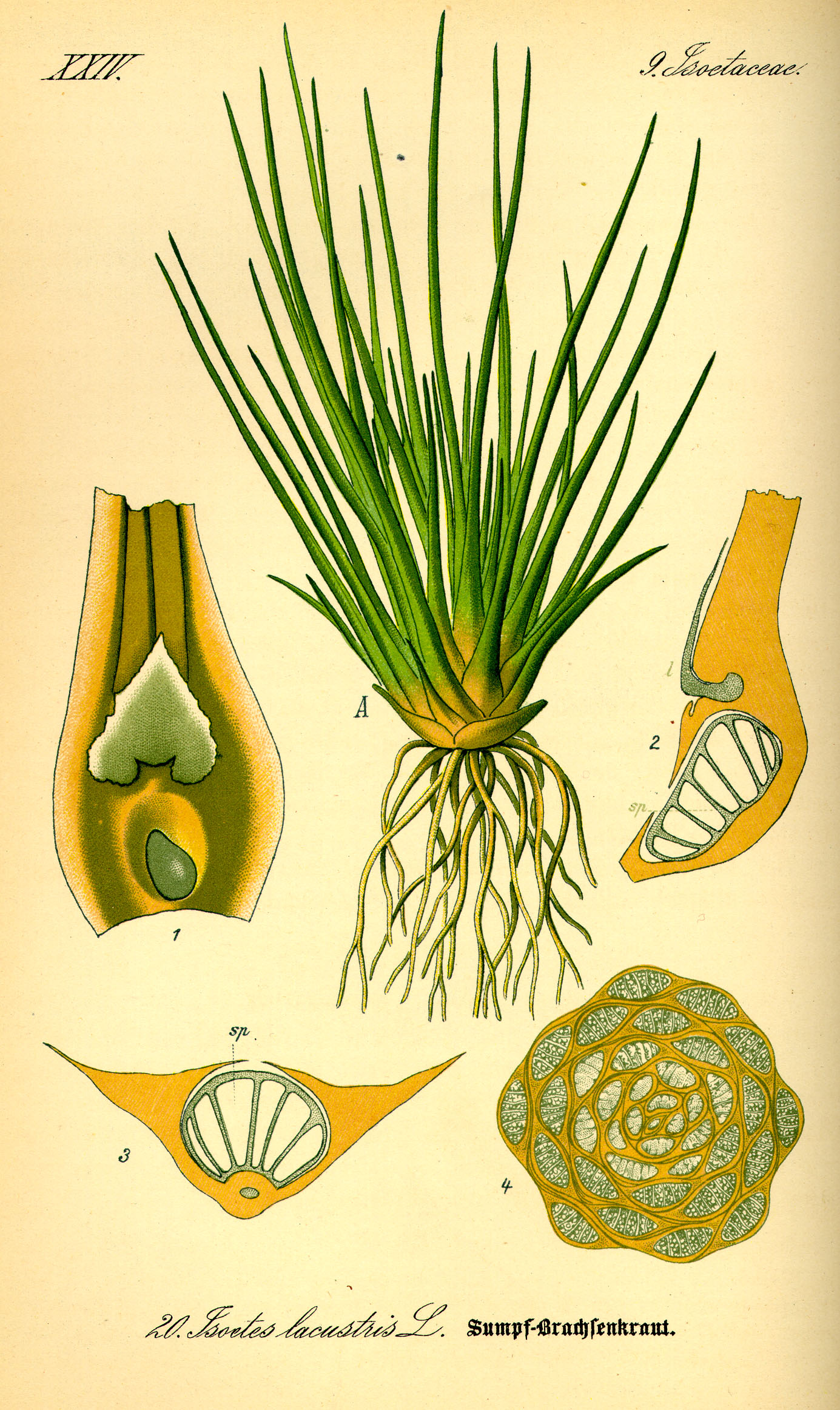
Microphylls contain a single vascular trace.

The clubmosses and horsetails have microphylls, as in all extant species there is only a single vascular trace in each leaf. These leaves are narrow because the width of the blade is limited by the distance water can efficiently diffuse cell-to-cell from the central vascular strand to the margin of the leaf. Despite their name, microphylls are not always small: those of Isoëtes can reach 25 centimetres in length, and the extinct Lepidodendron bore microphylls up to 78 cm long.

=== Evolution ===
The enation theory of microphyll evolution posits that small outgrowths, or enations, developed from the side of early stems (such as those found in the Zosterophylls). Outgrowths of the protostele (the central vasculature) later emerged towards the enations (as in Asteroxylon), and eventually continued to grow fully into the leaf to form the mid-vein (such as in Baragwanathia). The fossil record appears to display these traits in this order, but this may be a coincidence, as the record is incomplete. The telome theory proposes instead that both microphylls and megaphylls originated by the reduction; microphylls by reduction of a single telome branch, and megaphylls by evolution from branched portions of a telome.

The simplistic evolutionary models, however, do not correspond well to evolutionary relationships. Some genera of ferns display complex leaves that are attached to the pseudostele by an outgrowth of the vascular bundle, leaving no leaf gap. Horsetails (Equisetum) bear only a single vein, and appear to be microphyllous; however, the fossil record suggests that their forebears had leaves with complex venation, and their current state is a result of secondary simplification. Some gymnosperms bear needles with only one vein, but these evolved later from plants with complex leaves.

An interesting case is that of Psilotum, which has a (simple) protostele, and enations devoid of vascular tissue. Some species of Psilotum have a single vascular trace that terminates at the base of the enations. Consequently, Psilotum was long thought to be a "living fossil" closely related to early land plants (rhyniophytes). However, genetic analysis has shown Psilotum to be a reduced fern.

It is not clear whether leaf gaps are a homologous trait of megaphyllous organisms or have evolved more than once.

While the simple definitions (microphylls: one vein, macrophylls: more than one) can still be used in modern botany, the evolutionary history is harder to decipher.

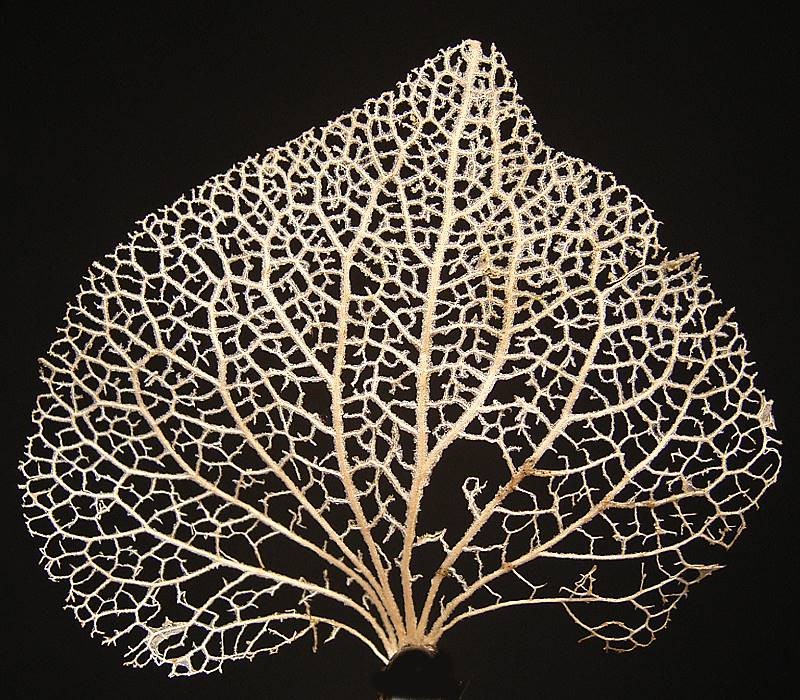
Megaphylls have a complex network of veins.

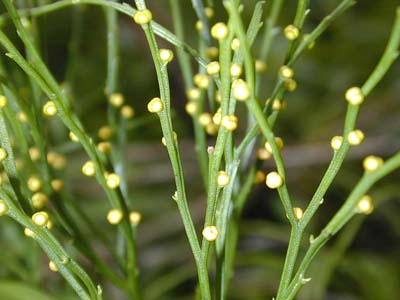
Psilotum has secondarily lost leaves, and bears enations resembling the microphylls of early land plants.

== See also ==
- Vegetation classification
