= Enation =

Scaly leaflike structures, differing from leaves in their lack of vascular tissue

An enation is a scaly leaflike structure, differing from a leaf in its lack of vascular tissue. Enations are created by some leaf diseases and occur normally on Psilotum. They are also found on some early plants such as Rhynia of the Devonian period, where they are hypothesized to have aided in photosynthesis.
