= List of Selaginella species =

The following is an alphabetical list of all 752 species of Selaginella that are accepted by Plants of the World Online as of October 2026.

== A ==
- Selaginella aboriginalis C.Schulz & Homberg
- Selaginella acanthonota Underw.
- Selaginella acanthostachys Baker
- Selaginella achotalensis Shelton & Caluff
- Selaginella aculeatifolia Valdespino
- Selaginella acutifolia (Stolze) Valdespino
- Selaginella adunca A.Braun ex Hieron.
- Selaginella aenea Warb.
- Selaginella afrorum (Milde) Hieron.
- Selaginella agioneuma Valdespino & C.López
- Selaginella aitchisonii Hieron.
- Selaginella alampeta M.Kessler & A.R.Sm.
- Selaginella albociliata P.S.Wang
- Selaginella albolineata A.R.Sm.
- Selaginella albomarginata Warb.
- Selaginella algida Jie Yang bis & X.C.Zhang
- Selaginella alligans Hieron.
- Selaginella alopecuroides Baker
- Selaginella alstonii G.Heringer, Salino & Valdespino
- Selaginella altheae Valdespino
- Selaginella alutacea Spring
- Selaginella amazonica Spring
- Selaginella amblyphylla Alston
- Selaginella amoena Linden
- Selaginella anaclasta Alston ex Crabbe & Jermy
- Selaginella anceps (C.Presl) C.Presl
- Selaginella andrewsii Jermy & J.S.Holmes
- Selaginella angustifolia Valdespino
- Selaginella angustiramea F.Muell. & Baker
- Selaginella apoda (L.) Spring
- Selaginella apoensis Hieron.
- Selaginella applanata A.Braun
- Selaginella arbuscula (Kaulf.) Spring
- Selaginella arbusculoides J.W.Moore
- Selaginella arenaria Baker
- Selaginella arenicola Underw.
- Selaginella argentea (Wall. ex Hook. & Grev.) Spring
- Selaginella aristata Spring
- Selaginella arizonica Maxon
- Selaginella armata Baker
- Selaginella arrecta A.R.Sm.
- Selaginella arsenei Weath.
- Selaginella arsiclada Valdespino
- Selaginella arthritica Alston
- Selaginella articulata (Kunze) Spring
- Selaginella asperula Mart. ex Spring
- Selaginella asplundii Crabbe & Jermy
- Selaginella asprella Maxon
- Selaginella atimonanensis B.C.Tan & Jermy
- Selaginella atirrensis Hieron.
- Selaginella auquieri Bizzarri
- Selaginella auriculata Spring
- Selaginella australiensis Baker
- Selaginella austro-orientalis H.J.Wei & X.M.Zhou
- Selaginella axillifolia Alderw.
- Selaginella ayitiensis Valdespino

== B ==
- Selaginella bahiensis Spring
- Selaginella balansae (A.Braun) Hieron.
- Selaginella balfourii Baker
- Selaginella bamleri Hieron.
- Selaginella banksii Alston
- Selaginella baodongii M.H.Zhang & Q.P.Xiang
- Selaginella barnebyana Valdespino
- Selaginella basipilosa Valdespino
- Selaginella beccariana Baker
- Selaginella behrmanniana Hieron.
- Selaginella beitelii A.R.Sm.
- Selaginella bemarahensis Stefanović & Rakotondr.
- Selaginella bernoullii Hieron.
- Selaginella bifida Delmail
- Selaginella biformis A.Braun ex Kuhn
- Selaginella bigelovii Underw.
- Selaginella birarensis Kuhn
- Selaginella bisulcata Spring
- Selaginella blepharodella Valdespino
- Selaginella blepharophylla Alston
- Selaginella bluuensis Alderw.
- Selaginella bodinieri Hieron. ex Christ
- Selaginella bombycina Spring
- Selaginella boninensis Baker
- Selaginella boomii Valdespino
- Selaginella boschai Hieron.
- Selaginella bracei Hieron. ex O.C.Schmidt
- Selaginella brachyblepharis Alderw.
- Selaginella braunii Baker
- Selaginella breedlovei Valdespino
- Selaginella brevifolia Baker
- Selaginella brevipes A.Braun
- Selaginella breweriana A.R.Sm.
- Selaginella breynii Spring
- Selaginella breynioides Baker
- Selaginella brigitteana Valdespino
- Selaginella brisbanensis F.M.Bailey
- Selaginella brooksii Hieron.
- Selaginella bryophila M.Kessler & A.R.Sm.
- Selaginella bryopteris (L.) Baker
- Selaginella buchholzii Hieron.
- Selaginella buergersiana Hieron.
- Selaginella burbidgei Baker
- Selaginella burkei Hieron.

== C ==
- Selaginella cabrerensis Hieron.
- Selaginella calceolata Jermy
- Selaginella calcicola Hieron.
- Selaginella calostachya (Hook. & Grev.) Alston
- Selaginella calosticha Spring
- Selaginella caluffii Shelton
- Selaginella canaliculata (L.) Spring
- Selaginella cardiophylla Valdespino
- Selaginella carinata R.M.Tryon
- Selaginella carioi Hieron.
- Selaginella carnea Alderw.
- Selaginella carnerosana T.Reeves
- Selaginella cataphracta (Willd.) Spring
- Selaginella cataractarum Alston
- Selaginella cathedrifolia Spring
- Selaginella caudata (Desv. ex Poir.) Spring
- Selaginella cavernaria Caluff & Shelton
- Selaginella cavifolia A.Braun
- Selaginella cesatii Hieron.
- Selaginella chaetoloma Alston
- Selaginella chaii Jermy
- Selaginella cheiromorpha Alston
- Selaginella chevalieri Hieron. ex Bonap.
- Selaginella chiangdaoensis (X.M.Zhou, Y.P.Hu & Chantanaorr.) comb. ined.
- Selaginella chiapensis A.R.Sm.
- Selaginella chionoloma Alston ex Crabbe & Jermy
- Selaginella christii Hieron.
- Selaginella chrysocaulos (Hook. & Grev.) Spring
- Selaginella chrysoleuca Spring
- Selaginella chrysorrhizos Spring
- Selaginella chuweimingii X.M.Zhou, Z.R.He, Liang Zhang & Li Bing Zhang
- Selaginella ciliaris (Retz.) Spring
- Selaginella cinerascens A.A.Eaton
- Selaginella coarctata Mart. ex Spring
- Selaginella cochleata (Hook. & Grev.) Spring
- Selaginella commutata Alderw.
- Selaginella concinna (Sw.) Spring
- Selaginella conduplicata Spring
- Selaginella conferta Veitch ex R.Hogg
- Selaginella confusa Spring
- Selaginella congoensis Alston
- Selaginella contigua Baker
- Selaginella convoluta (Arn.) Spring
- Selaginella coonooriana R.D.Dixit
- Selaginella copelandii Hieron.
- Selaginella corallina (Riddell) Wilbur & Whitson
- Selaginella cordifolia (Desv.) Spring
- Selaginella coriaceifolia X.M.Zhou, N.T.Lu & Li Bing Zhang
- Selaginella correae Valdespino
- Selaginella corrugis Mickel & Beitel
- Selaginella crassipes Spring
- Selaginella crinita Valdespino
- Selaginella cristalensis Shelton & Caluff
- Selaginella cruciformis Crabbe & Jermy
- Selaginella culverwellii N.R.Crouch
- Selaginella cumingiana Spring
- Selaginella cuneata Mickel & Beitel
- Selaginella cuprea Ridl.
- Selaginella cupressina (Willd.) Spring
- Selaginella curtisii Ridl.
- Selaginella cyclophylla A.R.Sm.

== D ==
- Selaginella dahlii Hieron.
- Selaginella darmandvillei Alderw.
- Selaginella dasyloma Alston
- Selaginella davidii Franch.
- Selaginella decipiens Warb.
- Selaginella decomposita Spring
- Selaginella decurrens Hieron.
- Selaginella deflexa Brack.
- Selaginella delicatissima A.Braun
- Selaginella delicatula (Desv.) Alston
- Selaginella dendricola Jenman
- Selaginella densa Rydb.
- Selaginella densiciliata X.M.Zhou, Liang Zhang & Bo Xu bis
- Selaginella densifolia Spruce ex Hook.
- Selaginella denticulata (L.) Spring
- Selaginella denudata (Willd.) Spring
- Selaginella devolii H.M.Chang, P.F.Lu & W.L.Chiou
- Selaginella dianzhongensis X.C.Zhang
- Selaginella dielsii Hieron.
- Selaginella diffusa Spring
- Selaginella digitata Spring
- Selaginella distachya Cordem.
- Selaginella distans Warb.
- Selaginella doederleinii Hieron.
- Selaginella dolichoclada Alston
- Selaginella dorsicola Hosok.
- Selaginella dosedlae Gilli
- Selaginella douglasii (Hook. & Grev.) Spring
- Selaginella dregei (C.Presl) Hieron.
- Selaginella drepanophylla Alston
- Selaginella x dualis Caluff & Shelton

== E ==
- Selaginella eatonii Hieron. ex Small
- Selaginella echinata Baker
- Selaginella eclipes W.R.Buck
- Selaginella ecuadoriana Gilli
- Selaginella effusa Alston
- Selaginella elegantissima Warb.
- Selaginella elmeri Hieron.
- Selaginella engleri Hieron.
- Selaginella epipubens Caluff & Shelton
- Selaginella epirrhizos Spring
- Selaginella erectifolia Spring
- Selaginella eremophila Maxon
- Selaginella erythropus (Mart.) Spring
- Selaginella eschscholzii Hieron.
- Selaginella estrellensis Hieron.
- Selaginella eublepharis A.Braun ex Hieron.
- Selaginella euclimax Crabbe & Jermy
- Selaginella eurynota A.Braun
- Selaginella exaltata (Kuntze) Spring
- Selaginella exasperata Warb.
- Selaginella exilis J.W.Moore
- Selaginella expansa Sodiro
- Selaginella extensa Underw.

== F ==
- Selaginella falcata (P.Beauv.) Spring
- Selaginella fenixii Hieron.
- Selaginella filicaulis Sodiro
- Selaginella finitima Mickel & Beitel
- Selaginella finium Alderw.
- Selaginella firmula A.Braun
- Selaginella firmuloides Warb.
- Selaginella fissidentoides (Hook. & Grev.) Spring
- Selaginella flabellata (L.) Spring
- Selaginella flabellum (Desv.) Spring
- Selaginella flacca Alston
- Selaginella flagellata Spring
- Selaginella flexuosa Spring
- Selaginella fragilis A.Braun
- Selaginella fragillima Silveira
- Selaginella frondosa Warb.
- Selaginella fruticulosa (Bory ex Willd.) Spring
- Selaginella fuertesii Hieron.
- Selaginella fulcrata (Buch.-Ham. ex D.Don) Spring
- Selaginella fulvicaulis Hieron.
- Selaginella furcillifolia Hieron.

== G ==
- Selaginella ganguliana R.D.Dixit
- Selaginella gastrophylla Warb.
- Selaginella gaudichaudiana Spring
- Selaginella geniculata (C.Presl) Spring
- Selaginella germinans Valdespino & C.López
- Selaginella gigantea Steyerm. & A.R.Sm.
- Selaginella gioiae Valdespino
- Selaginella glossophylla Crabbe & Jermy
- Selaginella goudotiana Spring
- Selaginella grabowskyi Warb.
- Selaginella gracilis T.Moore
- Selaginella gracillima (Kuntze) Spring ex Salomon
- Selaginella grallipes Alston
- Selaginella grandis T.Moore
- Selaginella graniticola Jie Yang bis & X.C.Zhang
- Selaginella griffithii Spring
- Selaginella grisea Alston
- Selaginella guatemalensis Baker
- Selaginella guihaia X.C.Zhang
- Selaginella gynostachya Valdespino
- Selaginella gypsophila A.R.Sm. & T.Reeves

== H ==
- Selaginella haematodes (Kunze) Spring
- Selaginella haenkeana Spring
- Selaginella hainanensis X.C.Zhang & Noot.
- Selaginella hallieri Alderw.
- Selaginella hansenii Hieron.
- Selaginella harrisii Underw. & Hieron.
- Selaginella hartii Hieron.
- Selaginella hartwegiana Spring
- Selaginella helferi Warb.
- Selaginella helicoclada Alston
- Selaginella hellwigii Hieron.
- Selaginella helvetica (L.) Spring
- Selaginella hemicardia Valdespino
- Selaginella heterodonta (Desv.) Hieron. ex Urb.
- Selaginella heterostachys Baker
- Selaginella hewittii Hieron.
- Selaginella hildebrandtii A.Braun ex Kuhn
- Selaginella hindsii Hieron.
- Selaginella hirsuta Alston ex Crabbe & Jermy
- Selaginella hirtifolia Valdespino
- Selaginella hispida (Willd.) A.Br. ex Urb.
- Selaginella hochreutineri Hieron.
- Selaginella hoffmannii Hieron.
- Selaginella hollrungii Hieron.
- Selaginella homaliae A.Braun
- Selaginella hordeiformis Baker
- Selaginella horizontalis (C.Presl) Spring
- Selaginella hosei Hieron.
- Selaginella huehuetenangensis Hieron.
- Selaginella humboldtiana A.Braun
- Selaginella hyalogramma Valdespino

== I ==
- Selaginella idiospora Alston
- Selaginella illecebrosa Alston
- Selaginella imbricans A.R.Sm.
- Selaginella imbricata (Forssk.) Spring ex Decne.
- Selaginella inaequalifolia (Hook. & Grev.) Spring
- Selaginella indica Tryon
- Selaginella ingens Alston
- Selaginella integrifolia Alderw.
- Selaginella intermedia (Blume) Spring
- Selaginella intertexta Spring
- Selaginella involvens (Sw.) Spring
- Selaginella iridescens X.C.Zhang & Y.R.Wang
- Selaginella ivanii Shelton & Caluff

== J ==
- Selaginella jacquemontii Spring
- Selaginella jagorii Warb.
- Selaginella jiulongensis (H.S.Kung, Li Bing Zhang & X.S.Guo) M.H.Zhang & X.C.Zhang
- Selaginella jugorum Hand.-Mazz.
- Selaginella jungermannioides (Gaudich.) Spring

== K ==
- Selaginella kaernbachii Hieron.
- Selaginella kalbreyeri Baker
- Selaginella kanehirae Alston
- Selaginella karimatae Alderw.
- Selaginella karowtipuensis Valdespino
- Selaginella keralensis R.D.Dixit
- Selaginella kerstingii Hieron.
- Selaginella ketra-ayam Alderw.
- Selaginella kittyae Alderw.
- Selaginella kivuensis Bizzarri
- Selaginella kochii Hieron.
- Selaginella kouytcheensis H.Lév.
- Selaginella kraussiana (Kunze) A.Braun
- Selaginella kriegeriana L.A.Góes
- Selaginella krugii Hieron.
- Selaginella kualaensis Shalimov
- Selaginella kunzeana A.Braun
- Selaginella kurzii Baker
- Selaginella kusaiensis Hosok.

== L ==
- Selaginella labordei Hieron. ex Christ
- Selaginella lacerata Warb.
- Selaginella lanceolata Warb.
- Selaginella landii Greenm. & N.Pfeiff.
- Selaginella latifolia (Hook. & Grev.) Spring
- Selaginella latupana Alderw.
- Selaginella lauterbachii Hieron.
- Selaginella laxa Spring
- Selaginella laxifolia Baker
- Selaginella laxistrobila K.H.Shing
- Selaginella lebongtandaiana Alderw.
- Selaginella lechleri Hieron.
- Selaginella ledermannii Hieron.
- Selaginella leonardii O.C.Schmidt
- Selaginella leoneensis Hieron.
- Selaginella lepida Hieron.
- Selaginella lepidophylla (Hook. & Grev.) Spring
- Selaginella leptophylla Baker
- Selaginella leucobryoides Maxon
- Selaginella leucoloma Crabbe & Jermy
- Selaginella leveriana Alston
- Selaginella lewalleana Bizzarri
- Selaginella limbata Alston
- Selaginella lindenii Spring
- Selaginella lindhardtii Hieron.
- Selaginella lineariformis Jermy
- Selaginella lineolata Mickel & Beitel
- Selaginella lingulata Spring
- Selaginella llanosii Hieron.
- Selaginella lobbii Veitch ex A.Braun
- Selaginella longiaristata Hieron.
- Selaginella longiciliata Hieron.
- Selaginella longipes Alderw.
- Selaginella longipinna Warb.
- Selaginella longirostris Alderw.
- Selaginella longissima Baker
- Selaginella lonko-batu Hieron. & Alderw.
- Selaginella loriai Hieron.
- Selaginella ludoviciana (A.Braun) A.Braun
- Selaginella lutchuensis Koidz.
- Selaginella luzonensis Hieron.
- Selaginella lyallii (Hook. & Grev.) Spring
- Selaginella lychnuchus Spring

== M ==
- Selaginella macilenta Baker
- Selaginella macrathera Weath.
- Selaginella macroblepharis Warb.
- Selaginella macrostachya (Spring) Spring
- Selaginella magnafornensis Valdespino & C.López
- Selaginella magnifica Warb.
- Selaginella mairei H.Lév.
- Selaginella mannii Baker
- Selaginella marahuacae A.R.Sm.
- Selaginella marginata (Humb. & Bonpl. ex Willd.) Spring
- Selaginella marinii Stefanović & Rakotondr.
- Selaginella marosensis Alderw.
- Selaginella martensii Spring
- Selaginella maxima Alderw.
- Selaginella mayeri Hieron.
- Selaginella mazaruniensis Jenman
- Selaginella megalura Hieron.
- Selaginella megaphylla Baker
- Selaginella megastachya Baker
- Selaginella melanesica Kuhn
- Selaginella mendoncae Hieron.
- Selaginella menziesii (Hook. & Grev.) Spring
- Selaginella meridensis Alston
- Selaginella mickelii Valdespino
- Selaginella microclada Baker
- Selaginella microdendron Baker
- Selaginella microdonta A.C.Sm.
- Selaginella microphylla (Kunth) Spring
- Selaginella microtus A.Braun
- Selaginella miniatospora (Dalzell) Baker
- Selaginella minima Spring
- Selaginella minutifolia Spring
- Selaginella mittenii Baker
- Selaginella mixteca Mickel & Beitel
- Selaginella moellendorffii Hieron.
- Selaginella molleri Hieron.
- Selaginella molliceps Spring
- Selaginella mollis A.Braun
- Selaginella monodii Alston
- Selaginella monospora Spring
- Selaginella monticola Valdespino
- Selaginella moraniana Valdespino & C.López
- Selaginella moratii W.Hagemann & Rauh
- Selaginella morgani Zeiller
- Selaginella moritziana Spring
- Selaginella mortoniana Crabbe & Jermy
- Selaginella mosorongensis Hieron.
- Selaginella moszkowskii Hieron.
- Selaginella mucronata G.Heringer, Salino & Valdespino
- Selaginella mucugensis Valdespino
- Selaginella muelleri Baker
- Selaginella muscosa Spring
- Selaginella mutica D.C.Eaton
- Selaginella myosuroides (Kaulf.) Spring
- Selaginella myosurus (Sw.) Alston
- Selaginella myriostachya Valdespino, C.López & L.A.Góes

== N ==
- Selaginella nana (Desv.) Spring
- Selaginella nanophylla Valdespino, C.López & L.A.Góes
- Selaginella nanuzae Valdespino
- Selaginella neblinae A.R.Sm.
- Selaginella neei Hieron.
- Selaginella negrosensis Hieron.
- Selaginella neocaledonica Baker
- Selaginella × neomexicana Maxon
- Selaginella neospringiana Valdespino
- Selaginella nipponica Franch. & Sav.
- Selaginella nivea Alston
- Selaginella njamnjamensis Hieron.
- Selaginella nothohybrida Valdespino
- Selaginella novae-guineae Hieron.
- Selaginella novae-hollandiae (Sw.) Spring
- Selaginella novoleonensis Hieron.
- Selaginella nubigena J.P.Roux
- Selaginella nummularia Warb.
- Selaginella nummulariifolia Ching

== O ==
- Selaginella oaxacana Spring
- Selaginella obovata S.Y.Dong
- Selaginella obtusa (P.Beauv.) Spring
- Selaginella odishana Sarv.K.Singh, P.K.Shukla & N.K.Dubey
- Selaginella opaca Warb.
- Selaginella ophioderma Valdespino & C.López
- Selaginella orbiculifolia Shelton & Caluff
- Selaginella oregana D.C.Eaton
- Selaginella orientalichinensis Ching & C.F.Zhang ex Hao Wei Wang & W.B.Liao
- Selaginella orizabensis Hieron.
- Selaginella ornata (Hook. & Grev.) Spring
- Selaginella ornithopodioides (L.) Spring
- Selaginella osaensis A.Rojas
- Selaginella ostenfeldii Hieron.
- Selaginella ovifolia Baker
- Selaginella oviformis Alderw.

== P ==
- Selaginella padangensis Hieron.
- Selaginella palauensis Hosok.
- Selaginella pallescens (C.Presl) Spring
- Selaginella pallida Spring
- Selaginella pallidissima Spring
- Selaginella palmiformis Alston ex Crabbe & Jermy
- Selaginella palu-palu F.M.Bailey
- Selaginella panurensis Baker
- Selaginella papillosa Valdespino
- Selaginella parachrysocaulos M.H.Zhang & X.C.Zhang
- Selaginella parishii Underw.
- Selaginella parkeri (Hook. & Grev.) Spring
- Selaginella parviarticulata W.R.Buck
- Selaginella parvifolia Alderw.
- Selaginella paxii Hieron.
- Selaginella pectopuellensis Valdespino & C.López
- Selaginella pedata Klotzsch
- Selaginella pellucidopunctata Valdespino
- Selaginella pennata (D.Don) Spring
- Selaginella pentagona Spring
- Selaginella permutata Hieron.
- Selaginella perottetii Spring
- Selaginella perpusilla Baker
- Selaginella peruviana (Milde ) Hieron.
- Selaginella pervillei Spring
- Selaginella petelotii Alston
- Selaginella phanotricha Baker
- Selaginella phiara Valdespino, C.López & L.A.Góes
- Selaginella philippina Spring
- Selaginella philipsonii (Jermy & J.M.Rankin) Valdespino
- Selaginella phillipsiana (Hieron.) Alston
- Selaginella picta A.Braun ex Baker
- Selaginella pilifera A.Braun
- Selaginella pilosula Alderw.
- Selaginella plagiochila Baker
- Selaginella plana (Desv.) Hieron.
- Selaginella plumieri Hieron.
- Selaginella plumosa (L.) C.Presl
- Selaginella poeppigiana (Spring) Splitg.
- Selaginella polita Ridl.
- Selaginella polymorpha Badré
- Selaginella polyptera Valdespino
- Selaginella polystachya (Warb.) Hieron.
- Selaginella popayanensis Hieron.
- Selaginella poperangensis Hieron. ex Rech.
- Selaginella porelloides (Lam.) Spring
- Selaginella porphyrospora A.Braun
- Selaginella posewitzii Hieron.
- Selaginella potaroensis Jenman
- Selaginella praestans Alston
- Selaginella praetermissa Alston
- Selaginella prasina Baker
- Selaginella presliana Spring
- Selaginella pricei B.C.Tan & Jermy
- Selaginella procera Alston
- Selaginella producta Baker
- Selaginella prolifera Valdespino
- Selaginella proniflora (Lam.) Baker
- Selaginella propinqua Alderw.
- Selaginella prostrata (H.S.Kung) Li Bing Zhang
- Selaginella protensa Alston
- Selaginella proxima R.M.Tryon
- Selaginella pruskiana Valdespino
- Selaginella pseudonipponica Tagawa
- Selaginella pseudopaleifera Hand.-Mazz.
- Selaginella pseudotamariscina X.C.Zhang & C.W.Chen
- Selaginella pseudovolkensii Hosok.
- Selaginella psittacorrhyncha Valdespino
- Selaginella pubens A.R.Sm.
- Selaginella puberulipes Alderw.
- Selaginella pubescens (Wall. ex Hook. & Grev.) Spring
- Selaginella pubimarginata Valdespino
- Selaginella pulvinata (Hook. & Grev.) Maxim.
- Selaginella pygmaea (Kaulf.) Alston

== Q ==
- Selaginella qingchengshanensis Li Bing Zhang & X.M.Zhou
- Selaginella quadrifaria Alston
- Selaginella quadrivenulosa Alderw.
- Selaginella quartiniana Cufod.

== R ==
Selaginella rachipterygia Valdespino, Cornejo & C.López

- Selaginella radiata (Aubl.) Baker
- Selaginella radicata (Hook. & Grev.) Spring
- Selaginella raiateensis J.W.Moore
- Selaginella ramosii Hieron.
- Selaginella ramosissima Baker
- Selaginella rasoloheryi Rakotondr.
- Selaginella raynaliana Tardieu
- Selaginella rechingeri Hieron.
- Selaginella reflexa Underw.
- Selaginella reineckei Hieron.
- Selaginella remotifolia Spring
- Selaginella repanda (Desv.) Spring
- Selaginella reticulata (Hook. & Grev.) Spring
- Selaginella revoluta Baker
- Selaginella rhodostachya Baker
- Selaginella ribae Valdespino
- Selaginella ridleyi Baker
- Selaginella rivalis Ridl.
- Selaginella robinsonii Alderw.
- Selaginella rodriguesiana Baker
- Selaginella roesickeana Hieron.
- Selaginella rolandi-principis Alston
- Selaginella roraimensis Baker
- Selaginella rosea Alston
- Selaginella rossii (Baker) Warb.
- Selaginella rostrata Valdespino
- Selaginella rothertii Alderw.
- Selaginella rotundifolia Spring
- Selaginella roxburghii (Hook. & Grev.) Spring
- Selaginella royenii Alston
- Selaginella rugulosa Ces.
- Selaginella rupestris (L.) Spring
- Selaginella rupincola Underw.
- Selaginella rzedowskii Lorea-Hern.

== S ==
- Selaginella sajanensis Stepanov & Sonnikova
- Selaginella sakuraii H.Miller
- Selaginella salazariae Valdespino
- Selaginella salinoi L.A.Góes & G.Heringer
- Selaginella saltuicola Valdespino
- Selaginella sambasensis Hieron.
- Selaginella sambiranensis Stefanović & Rakotondr.
- Selaginella sandvicensis Baker
- Selaginella sandwithii Alston
- Selaginella sanguinolenta (L.) Spring
- Selaginella sarawakensis Hieron.
- Selaginella sartorii Hieron.
- Selaginella scabrida Ridl.
- Selaginella scabrifolia Ching & Chu H.Wang
- Selaginella scalariformis A.C.Sm.
- Selaginella schaffneri Hieron.
- Selaginella schatteburgiana Hieron.
- Selaginella schefferi Hieron.
- Selaginella schiedeana A.Braun
- Selaginella schizobasis Baker
- Selaginella schlechteri Hieron.
- Selaginella schultesii Alston ex Crabbe & Jermy
- Selaginella schumannii Hieron.
- Selaginella scopulorum Maxon
- Selaginella sechellarum Baker
- Selaginella seemannii Baker
- Selaginella selaginoides (L.) P.Beauv. ex Schrank & Mart.
- Selaginella selangorensis Bedd. ex Ridl.
- Selaginella sellowii Hieron.
- Selaginella sematophylla Valdespino, G.Heringer & Salino
- Selaginella semicordata (Wall. ex Hook. & Grev.) Spring
- Selaginella sepikensis Hieron.
- Selaginella sericea A.Braun
- Selaginella serpens (Desv.) Spring
- Selaginella serratosquarrosa Quansah
- Selaginella serrulata (Desv.) Spring
- Selaginella sertata Spring
- Selaginella sespillifolia Brownlie
- Selaginella setchellii O.C.Schmidt
- Selaginella shabaensis Bizzarri
- Selaginella shakotanensis (Franch. ex Takeda) Miyabe & Kudô
- Selaginella shen-siensis Christ
- Selaginella siamensis Hieron.
- Selaginella sibirica (Milde ) Hieron.
- Selaginella silvestris Aspl.
- Selaginella simplex Baker
- Selaginella simpokakensis Hieron.
- Selaginella sinensis (Desv.) Spring
- Selaginella singalanensis Hieron.
- Selaginella sinuosa (Desv.) Alston
- Selaginella smithiorum Valdespino
- Selaginella sobolifera A.R.Sm.
- Selaginella societatis J.W.Moore
- Selaginella solomonii Valdespino
- Selaginella soneratii Hieron.
- Selaginella soyauxii Hieron.
- Selaginella spanielema Alston
- Selaginella sparsifolia (Desv.) Badré
- Selaginella speciosa A.Braun
- Selaginella squamulosa Valdespino
- Selaginella squarrosa Baker
- Selaginella standleyi Maxon
- Selaginella stauntoniana Spring
- Selaginella stellata Spring
- Selaginella stenophylla A.Braun
- Selaginella steyermarkii Alston
- Selaginella stipulata (Blume) Spring
- Selaginella stolleana Hieron.
- Selaginella stomatoloma Valdespino
- Selaginella striata Caluff & Shelton
- Selaginella strigosa Bedd.
- Selaginella strobiformis Warb.
- Selaginella suavis (Spring) Spring
- Selaginella subalpina Alderw.
- Selaginella subcalcarata Alderw.
- Selaginella subchaetoloma X.M.Zhou, Li Bing Zhang & Z.R.He
- Selaginella subcordata A.Braun ex Kuhn
- Selaginella subdiaphana (Wall. ex Hook. & Grev.) Spring
- Selaginella subeffusa Shalimov & X.C.Zhang
- Selaginella subisophylla Jermy
- Selaginella submonospora Shalimov & X.C.Zhang
- Selaginella subrugosa Mickel & Beitel
- Selaginella subserpentina Alderw.
- Selaginella subspinulosa Spring
- Selaginella subsplendens C.Presl
- Selaginella substipitata Spring
- Selaginella subtrisulcata Alderw.
- Selaginella subvaginata X.C.Zhang & Shalimov
- Selaginella suffruticosa Alderw.
- Selaginella sulcata (Desv.) Spring ex Mart.
- Selaginella sungemagneana Alderw.
- Selaginella surucucusensis L.A.Góes & E.L.M.Assis

== T ==
- Selaginella tama-montana Seriz.
- Selaginella tamariscina (P.Beauv.) Spring
- Selaginella tanyclada Alston ex Crabbe & Jermy
- Selaginella tarda Mickel & Beitel
- Selaginella taylorii Valdespino
- Selaginella temehaniensis J.W.Moore
- Selaginella tenella (P.Beauv.) Spring
- Selaginella tenera (Hook. & Grev.) Spring
- Selaginella tenerrima A.Braun ex Kuhn
- Selaginella tenuifolia Spring
- Selaginella tenuissima Fée
- Selaginella tereticaulos (Desv.) Spring
- Selaginella terezoana Bautista
- Selaginella thomensis Alston
- Selaginella thurnwaldiana Hieron.
- Selaginella thysanophylla A.R.Sm.
- Selaginella tibetica Ching & S.K.Wu
- Selaginella tomentosa Spring
- Selaginella torricelliana Alderw.
- Selaginella tortipila A.Braun
- Selaginella trachyphylla (Warb.) A.Braun ex Hieron.
- Selaginella trichoclada Alston
- Selaginella trisulcata Aspl.
- Selaginella truncata A.Braun
- Selaginella trygonoides Valdespino
- Selaginella tuberculata Spruce ex Baker
- Selaginella tuberosa B.McAlpin & Lellinger
- Selaginella tyleri A.C.Sm.
- Selaginella tylophora Alderw.

== U ==
- Selaginella uliginosa (Labill.) Spring
- Selaginella umbrosa Lem. ex Hieron.
- Selaginella uncinata (Desv.) Spring
- Selaginella undata Shelton & Caluff
- Selaginella underwoodii Hieron.
- Selaginella unilateralis Spring
- Selaginella urquiolae Caluff & Shelton
- Selaginella usterii Hieron.
- Selaginella utahensis Flowers

== V ==
- Selaginella vaginata Spring
- Selaginella valdepilosa Baker
- Selaginella valida Alston
- Selaginella vanderystii Bizzarri
- Selaginella vardei H.Lév.
- Selaginella velutina Cesati
- Selaginella ventricosa Valdespino & C.López
- Selaginella vernicosa Baker
- Selaginella versatilis A.R.Sm.
- Selaginella versicolor Spring
- Selaginella vestiens Baker
- Selaginella vestita Alderw.
- Selaginella victoriae W.Bull
- Selaginella vieillardii Warb.
- Selaginella viridangula Spring
- Selaginella viridissima Weath.
- Selaginella viridula (Bory ex Willd.) Spring
- Selaginella viticulosa Klotzsch
- Selaginella vogelii Spring
- Selaginella volkensii Hieron.
- Selaginella volubilis Alston
- Selaginella vonroemeri Alderw.

== W ==
- Selaginella wahauensis Hieron.
- Selaginella wallacei Hieron.
- Selaginella wallichii (Hook. & Grev.) Spring
- Selaginella wangpeishanii Li Bing Zhang, H.He & Q.W.Sun
- Selaginella wariensis Hieron.
- Selaginella watsonii Underw.
- Selaginella wattii Baker
- Selaginella weatherbiana R.M.Tryon
- Selaginella weinlandii Hieron.
- Selaginella whitmeei Baker
- Selaginella wightii Hieron.
- Selaginella willdenowii (Desv.) Baker
- Selaginella wilsonii Hieron.
- Selaginella wolfii Sodiro
- Selaginella wrightii Hieron.
- Selaginella wurdackii Alston

Selaginella wuyishanensis

== X ==
- Selaginella xanthoneura Valdespino
- Selaginella xipholepis Baker
- Selaginella xiphophylla Baker

== Y ==
- Selaginella yemensis (Sw.) Spring
- Selaginella yunckeri Alston

== Z ==
- Selaginella zahnii Hieron.
- Selaginella zartmanii Valdespino, C.López & A.M.Sierra
- Selaginella zechii Hieron.
- Selaginella zhangii S.Y.Dong
- Selaginella zollingeriana Spring
