= S. australiensis =

S. australiensis may refer to:

- Scoparia australiensis, a moth in the family Crambidae
- Selaginella australiensis, a plant in the spikemoss family Selaginellaceae
- Semecarpus australiensis, the tar tree, a species of tree in the family Anacardiaceae
- Solinus australiensis, a species of pseudoscorpion in the family Garypinidae
- Storckiella australiensis, a species of large rainforest tree in the family Fabaceae
- Sundochernes australiensis, a species of pseudoscorpion in the family Chernetidae
- Sutorius australiensis, a species of bolete mushroom
