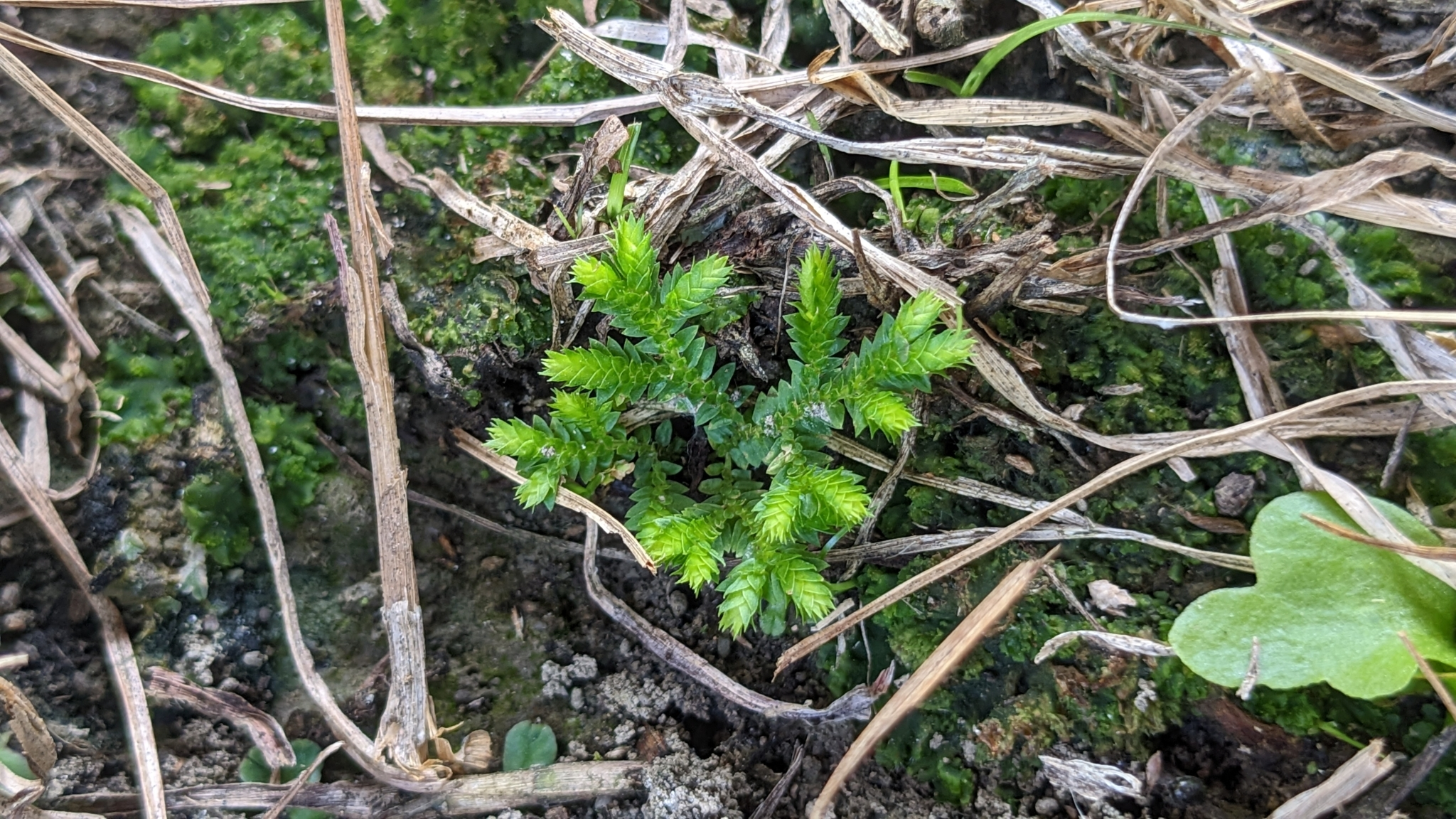

Conservation status
- Least Concern (NCA)

Scientific classification
- Kingdom: Plantae
- Clade: Tracheophytes
- Clade: Lycophytes
- Class: Lycopodiopsida
- Order: Selaginellales
- Family: Selaginellaceae
- Genus: Selaginella
- Species: S. ciliaris

Binomial name
- Selaginella ciliaris (Retz.) Spring

Synonyms
- 20 synonyms: Lycopodium ciliare Retz.; Lycopodioides ciliaris (Retz.) Kuntze; Stachygynandrum ciliare (Retz.) P.Beauv.; Lycopodium belangeri Bory; Lycopodium depressum Sw.; Lycopodium pumilio R.Br.; Lycopodioides depressa (Sw.) Kuntze; Lycopodioides exigua (Spring) Kuntze; Lycopodioides pumilio (R.Br.) Kuntze; Selaginella belangeri (Bory) Spring; Selaginella belangeri f. olivacea Alderw.; Selaginella congregata; Selaginella depressa (Sw.) Spring; Selaginella exigua Spring; Selaginella papana Alderw.; Selaginella proniflora Baker; Selaginella pumilio (R.Br.) Spring; Selaginella ujensis Hieron.; Selaginella winkleri Hieron.; Stachygynandrum depressum (Sw.) Carruth.

= Selaginella ciliaris =

Species of spore-bearing plant

Selaginella ciliaris is a plant in the family Selaginellaceae which is native to areas from India and Nepal eastwards to China and Taiwan, and south to northern Australia.

== Description ==
This is a tiny, low growing herbaceous plant that forms small tufts at the bases of fallen trees and boulders. The creeping stem is up to 10 cm (3.9 in) long and produces roots along its length. It has ascending branches up to 5 cm (2.0 in) long. The leaves are very small, up to 2 mm (0.08 in) in length. The sporangia are borne in the upper leaf axils.

== Taxonomy ==
The family Selaginellaceae is considered to be primitive and is often referred to as a "fern ally". This species has been described numerous times – the first description was published in 1789 by the Swedish botanist Anders Jahan Retzius who gave it the name Lycopodium ciliare. Several other 19th century botanists, including Robert Brown and Carl Ernst Otto Kuntze, also published this species under various binomial combinations. The currently accepted name, Selaginella ciliaris, was provided by Antoine Frédéric Spring and published in 1843.

== Distribution and habitat ==
Plants of the World Online gives the native distribution of this plant as follows: Andaman Islands, Assam, Bangladesh, Caroline Islands, China South-Central, China Southeast, East Himalaya, Hainan, India, Java, Malaya, Maluku, Marianas, Myanmar, Nepal, New Guinea, Nicobar Islands, Northern Territory, Philippines, Queensland, Solomon Islands, Sri Lanka, Sulawesi, Sumatra, Taiwan, Thailand, Vietnam, West Himalaya and Western Australia.

In Australia this species is limited to the northwest of Western Australia, Arnhem Land in the Northern Territory, and northeastern Queensland, and is found in wet habitats dominated by eucalypts.

== Conservation ==
This species is listed by the Queensland Department of Environment and Science as least concern. As of 18 May 2023, it has not been assessed by the International Union for Conservation of Nature (IUCN).
