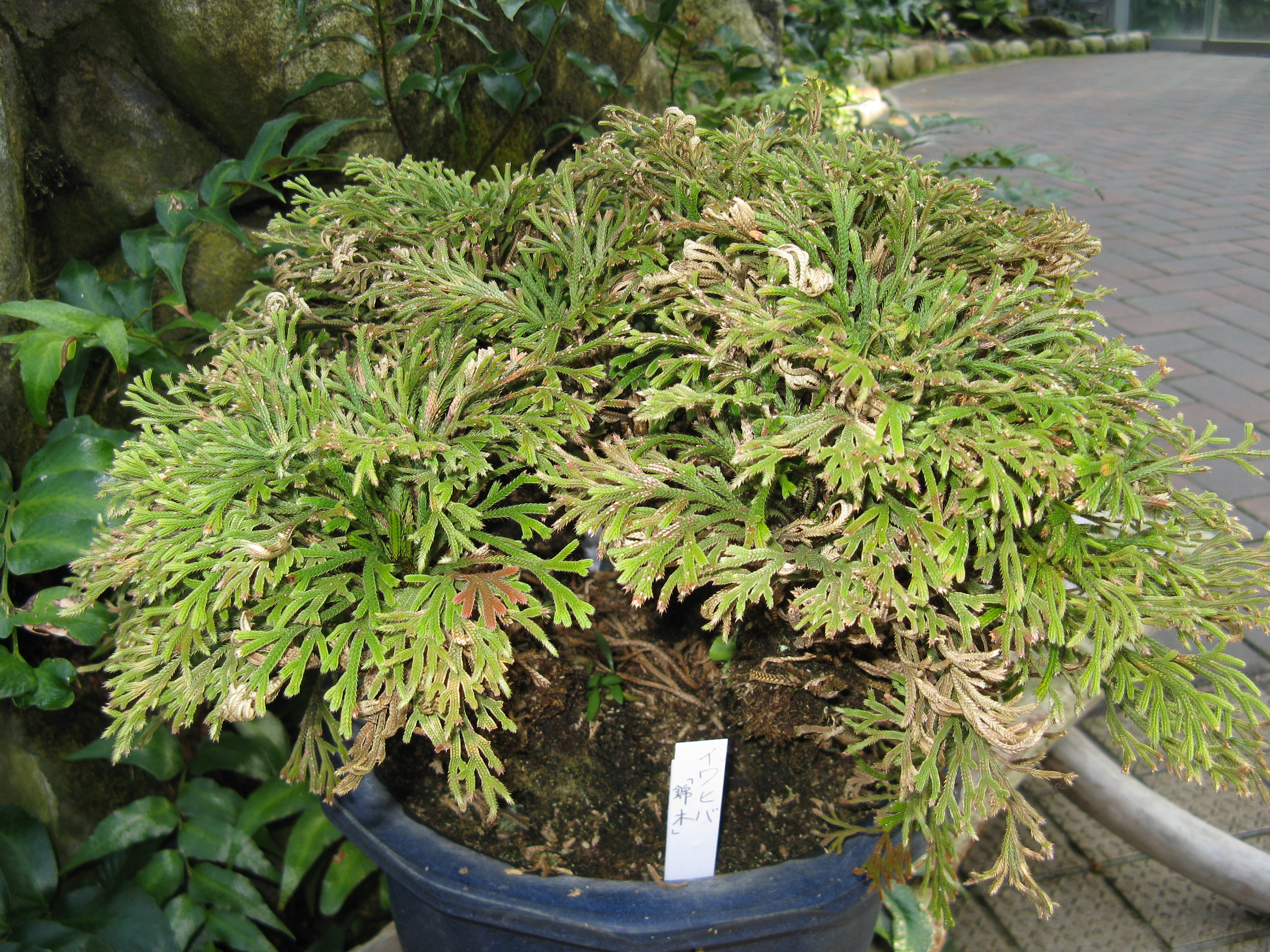

Scientific classification
- Kingdom: Plantae
- Clade: Tracheophytes
- Clade: Lycophytes
- Class: Lycopodiopsida
- Order: Selaginellales
- Family: Selaginellaceae
- Genus: Selaginella
- Species: S. tamariscina

Binomial name
- Selaginella tamariscina (P.Beauv.) Spring

= Selaginella tamariscina =

Species of spore-bearing plant

Selaginella tamariscina is a species of plant in the Selaginellaceae family, endemic to China, India, Japan, Korea, Philippines, Russia (Siberia), Taiwan, and northern Thailand. It was first described in 1804 by Palisot de Beauvois as Stachygynandrum tamariscinum (or possibly in 1805) It was transferred to the genus, Selaginella, in 1843 by Antoine Frédéric Spring.

It is an evergreen perennial growing to 45 cm in height. It is often used as an herbal medicine, and has been used to treat gout and hyperuricemia.

== Synonyms ==
- Lycopodioides tamariscina (P.Beauv.) H.S.Kung
- Lycopodium caulescens Wall. ex Hook. & Grev.
- Lycopodium involvens Sw.
- Lycopodium tamariscinum (P.Beauv.) Desv. ex Poir.
- Selaginella caulescens (Wall. ex Hook. & Grev.) Spring
- Selaginella involvens (Sw.) Spring
- Selaginella tamariscina var. tamariscina
- Selaginella veitchii W.R.McNab
- Stachygynandrum tamariscinum P.Beauv.

== Other sources ==
- The Plant List
- Flora of China
- Plants for a Future
- "Selaginella tamariscina". Germplasm Resources Information Network. Agricultural Research Service, United States Department of Agriculture.
