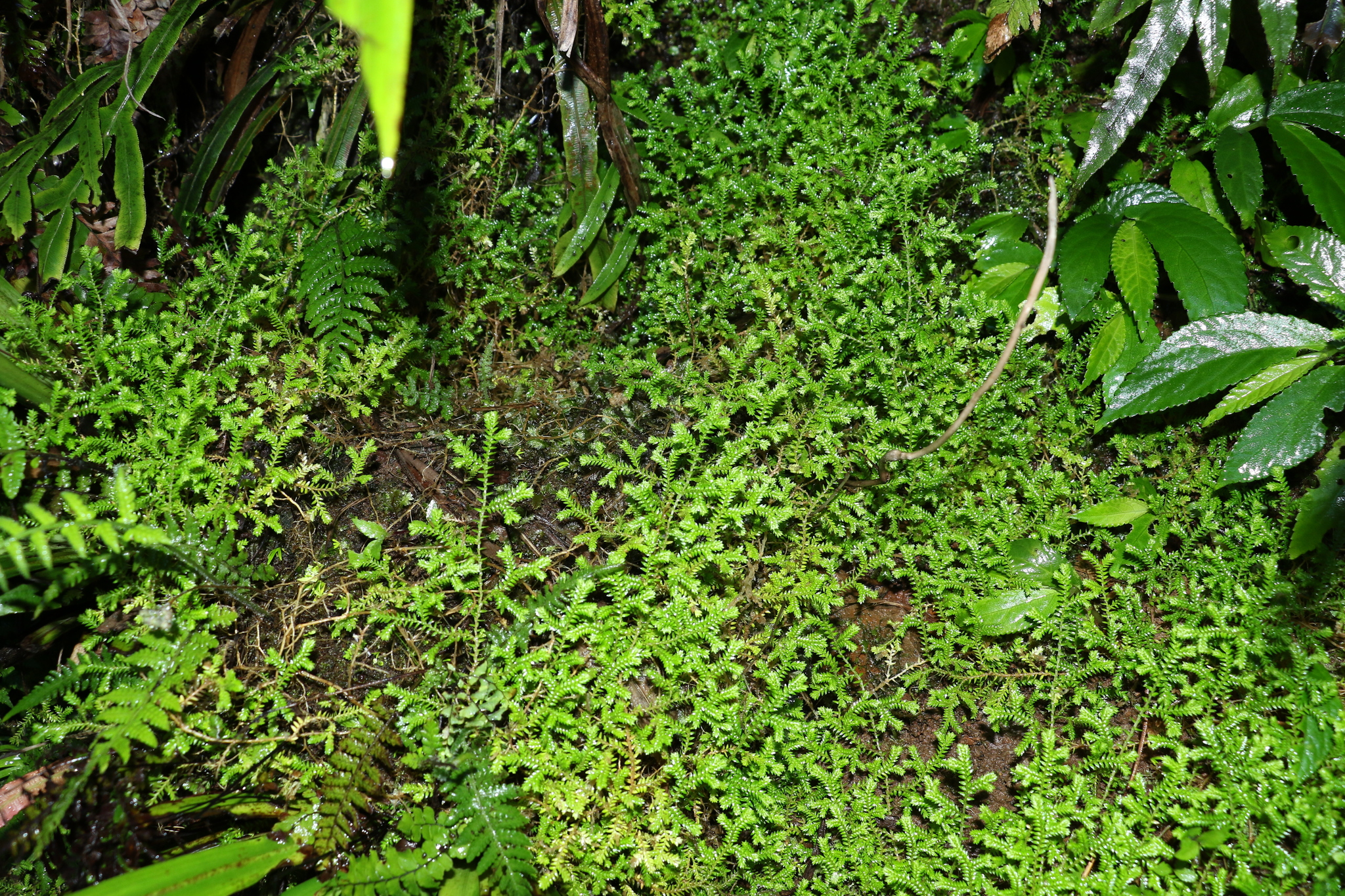

Conservation status
- Least Concern (NCA)

Scientific classification
- Kingdom: Plantae
- Clade: Tracheophytes
- Clade: Lycophytes
- Class: Lycopodiopsida
- Order: Selaginellales
- Family: Selaginellaceae
- Genus: Selaginella
- Species: S. brisbanensis

Binomial name
- Selaginella brisbanensis F.M.Bailey

Synonyms
- Lycopodioides brisbanensis (F.M.Bailey) Kuntze

= Selaginella brisbanensis =

Species of plant

Selaginella brisbanensis is a plant in the spikemoss family Selaginellaceae endemic to northeastern and southeastern Queensland. It grows in rainforest and wet sclerophyll forest in two very disjunct populations, one centred around Cairns and the other around Brisbane, some 1,400 km (870 mi) south. It is a terrestrial plant growing up to 20 cm (7.9 in) high.

== Conservation ==
This species is listed by the Queensland Department of Environment and Science as least concern. As of 8 January 2023, it has not been assessed by the IUCN.

== Gallery ==
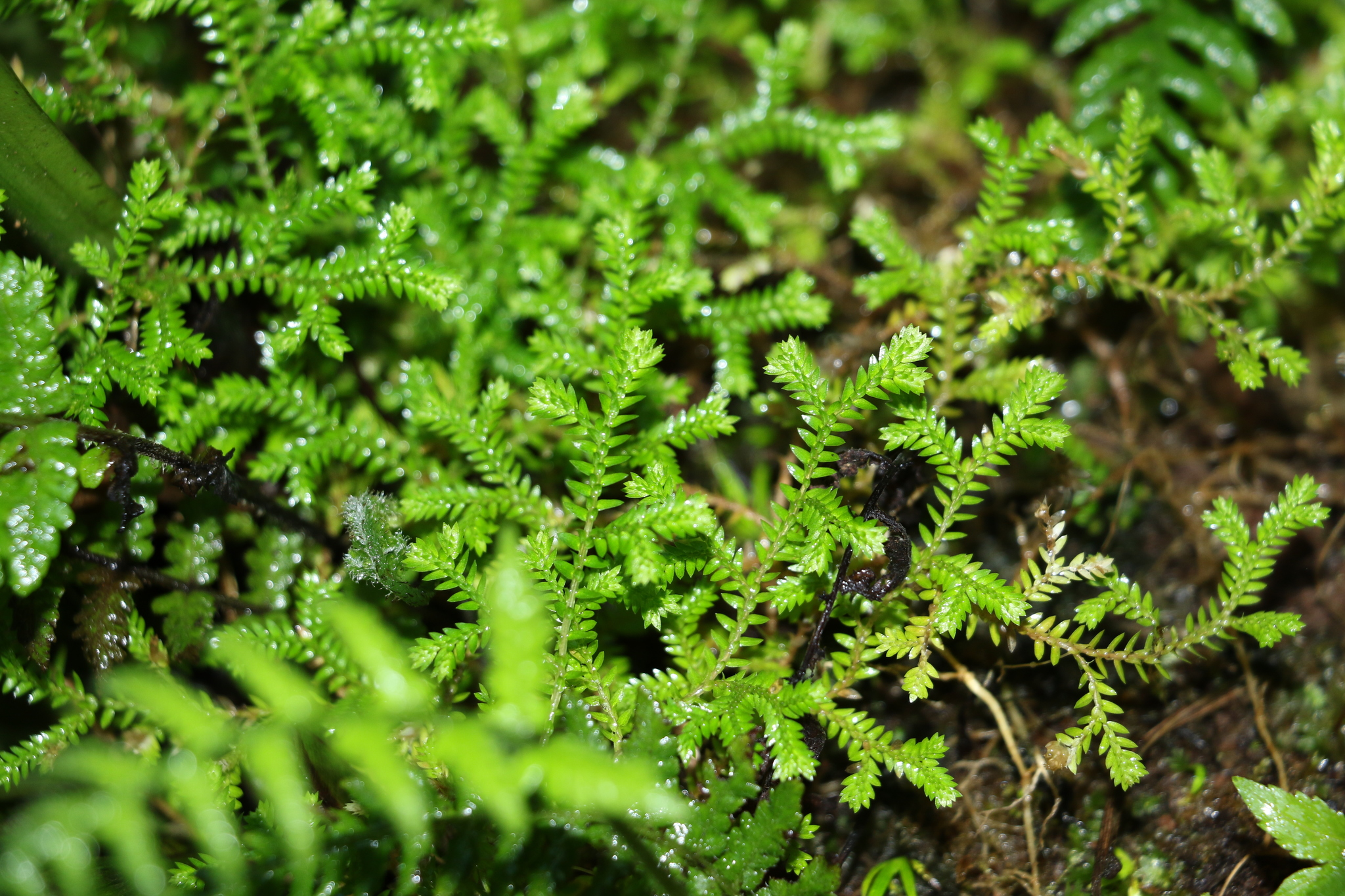

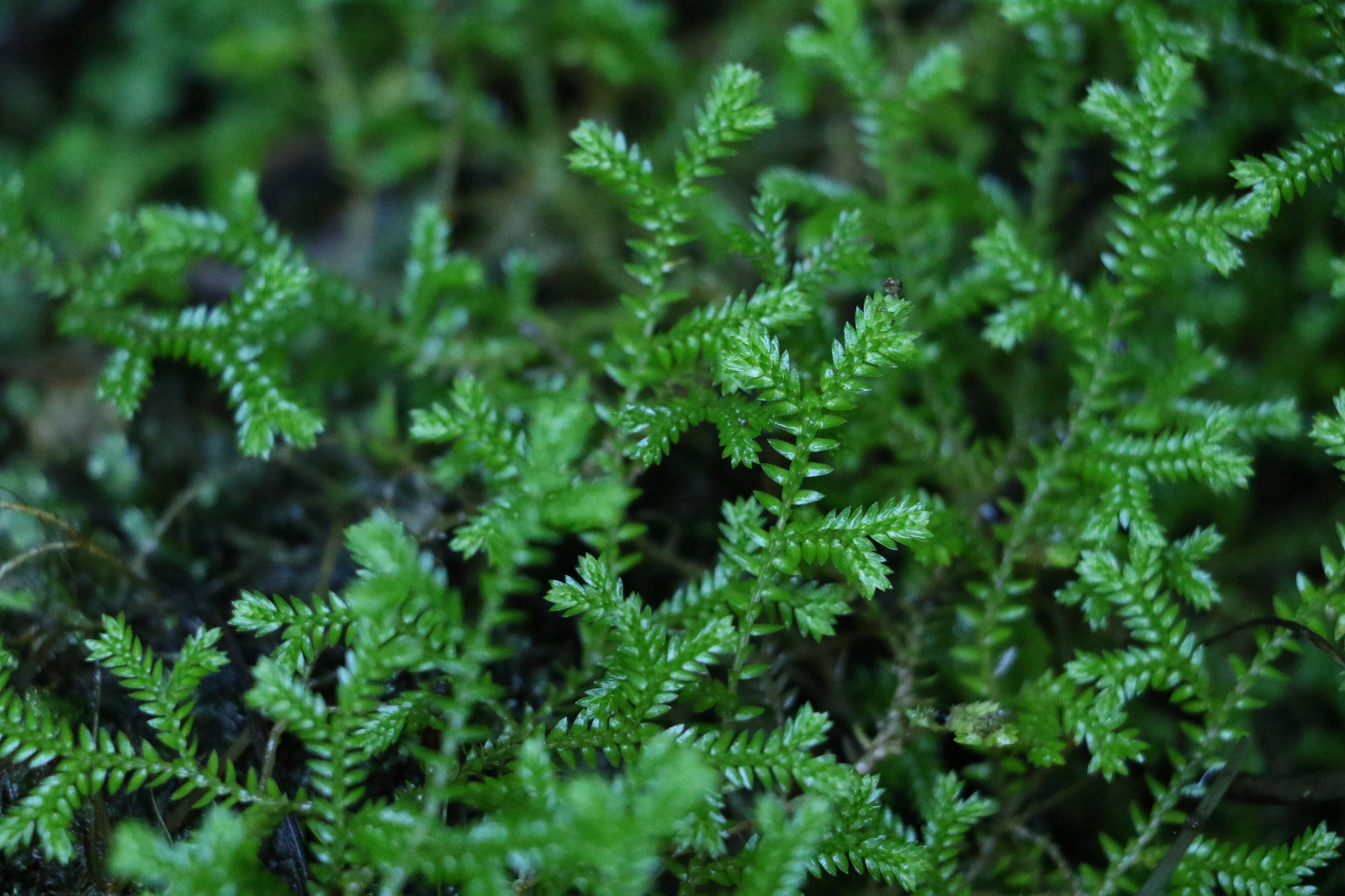

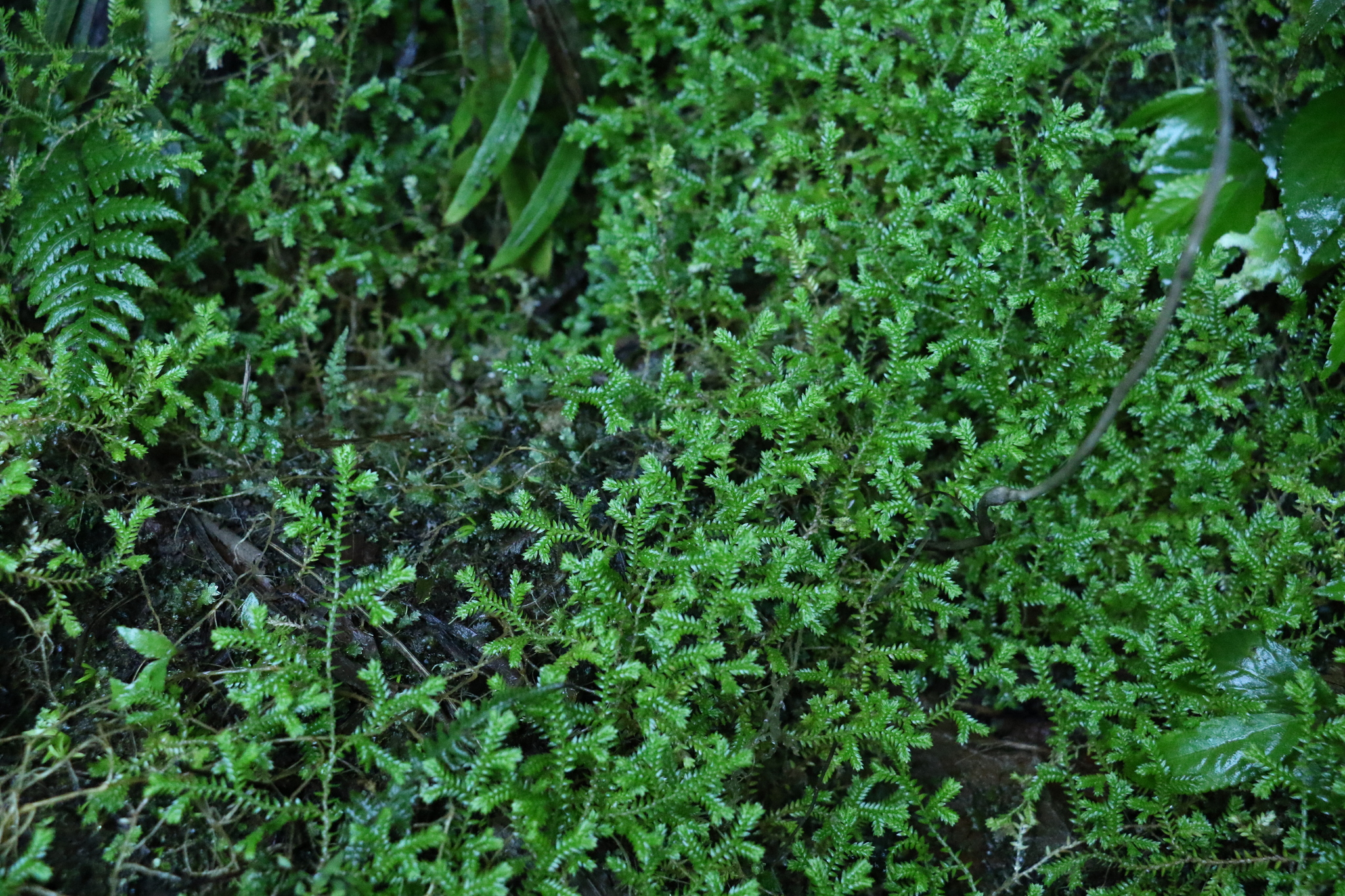
