= Walthère Victor Spring =

Belgian chemist (1848–1911)

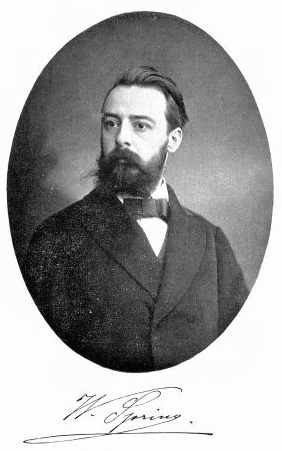
- Born: 6 March 1848; Liège, Belgium
- Died: 17 July 1911 (aged 63)
- Education: University of Bonn
- Known for: Early experimentation in mechanochemistry
- Scientific career
- Workplaces: University of Liège

Walthère Victor Spring (6 March 1848 – 17 July 1911) was a Belgian experimental chemist and a professor at the University of Liège who conducted early experiments in mechanochemistry, sometimes relating his findings to geologic phenomena. Spring also conducted research on the effect of carbon dioxide in the atmosphere and the greenhouse effect. He also took an interest in the study of light scattering and the Tyndall effect and examined the cause of the colour of the sky and water.

== Biography ==
Spring was born in Liège, to physician and professor of medicine, Antoine Frédéric Spring who was of Bavarian ancestry. As a child, Spring showed little interest in academic subjects, while showing a natural aptitude for hands-on mechanical skills and crafting physical objects, all despite his father's encouragement. Initially, he did not pass his university entrance examinations. Spring went to work as a gunsmith, and this employment enhanced Spring's mechanical skills, which became useful to him in his research career.

As a young man, Spring became interested in mountaineering. His observations of glaciated mountain regions piqued his interest in physical and chemical changes that result from high pressures over sustained periods of time.

During this time, under the mentorship of Belgian chemist Jean Stas, Spring resumed his studies of chemistry and physics. He again took his university entrance exams, this time passing. He entered the mining school at the University of Liege, where he received a diploma in 1871.

At that point, Spring then enrolled at the University of Bonn to pursue an advanced academic degree under scientists August Kekulé and Rudolf Clausius. As part of his studies, Spring investigated chemical transformations of certain sulfur compounds such as polythionates and sulfur oxoacids. He also synthesized new chemical compounds of these types.

Spring joined the University of Liège in 1876 as a lecturer in mathematical physics, although he taught organic chemistry soon after. He was a corresponding member of the Royal Academy of Sciences of Belgium from 1877 and became its president in 1899. Early in his career at Liège, Spring established the university's first teaching laboratory for chemistry.

Spring was married to Jeanne Springm(née Beaujean) with whom he had two children, Suzanne Spring and Hermann Spring.

Spring died of a pulmonary infection on 17 July 1911.

== Scientific contributions ==
Spring recognized that carbon dioxide and other substances could act as greenhouse gases. He conducted investigations on the effect of high pressure on chemical compositions including its relationship to geologic phenomena. He investigated light scattering effects including the color of pure water and the effects of suspended particles.

=== Greenhouse gases ===
In 1886 Spring gave a presentation at the academy on variability of carbon dioxide content in the atmosphere and noted that the city of Liège had a higher concentration than the surrounding countryside, possibly due to the use of coal for heating homes and the slow burning of grisou in the Saint-Jacques district which produced methane. Along with Léon Roland he examined weather measurements and noted that the air cooled less slowly due to the water vapour and carbon dioxide. Spring contended that the higher temperatures in the Liège vicinity was a greenhouse effect of carbon dioxide. In this respect, Spring's observations were a forerunner of global greenhouse effects, later articulated by Svante Arrhenius and others.

In contrast to the work of Arrhenius, Spring's early reports on greenhouse effects of carbon dioxide indicated that these were local effects rather than global. An English translation of Spring's observations of greenhouse effects are, "the atmosphere charged with water vapor and CO_{2} protects the earth against a cooling as does a greenhouse”.

=== Light scattering ===
Noting that the color of the nearby Meuse River varied almost daily, Spring investigated the color of pure water. He purified water by chemical means and then shined white light through columns of water up to 10 meters in length. He determined that the light observed perpendicular to the light beam (the scattered light) had a bluish color, even though no color was observed when directly viewing the light beam. Spring further found that then dissolving various substances into the water then altered the color of the scattered light. He applied similar techniques to determine the color of pure paraffins and pure alcohols. These light scattering phenomena were later termed the Tyndall effect.

=== Mechanochemistry ===
Motivated by his observations as a mountaineer, Spring perceived that the high pressures generated, for example, by the weight of rocky terrain or glaciated terrain could induce significant physical and chemical changes to various substances. Making use of his mechanical skills, Spring constructed in his laboratory equipment that could exert pressures on test samples that were as much as 25,000 atmospheres so as to replicate pressures found in geologic conditions. Because he perceived that the chemical and physical effects of high pressure on geologic materials could take extended periods of time, his equipment could maintain these pressures for years. He further included a vacuum pump in his apparatus so as to remove gases from his test samples.

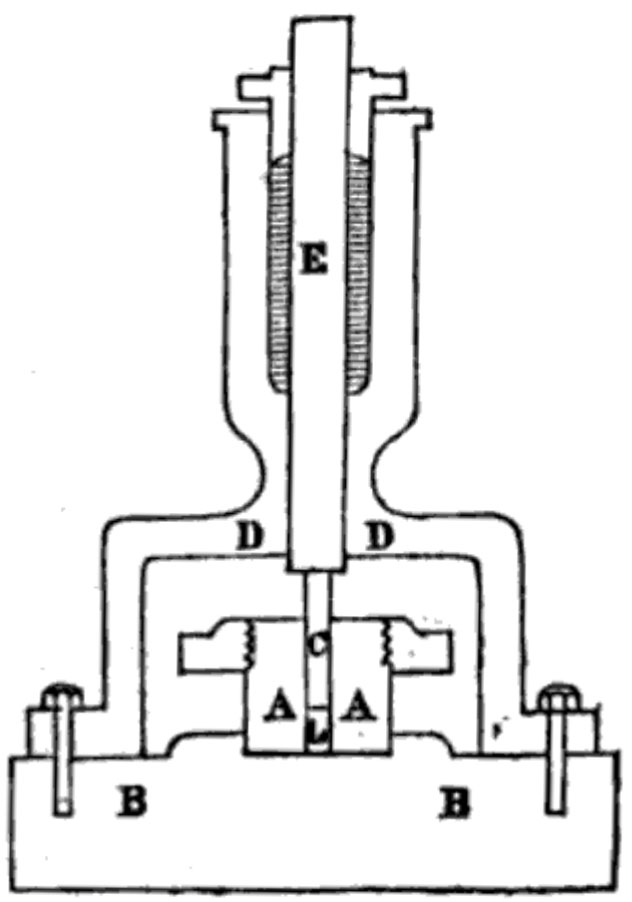
Sketch of the piston press used for experiments in mechanochemistry, as published by Spring in 1880.

Using his apparatus for an early demonstration of powder metallurgy, Spring found that high pressures could fuse metal powders into solid metallic objects. Further, he found that the high pressures generated by his apparatus could combine mixtures of powdered copper and powdered zinc into layers of brass, this transformation occurring at the interface between the two types of powders. These experiments showed that metal alloys could be formed under sufficiently high pressures.

In further experimentation with his high pressure equipment, Spring showed that sufficiently high pressure converted peat into a substance much like soft coal or lignite. He likewise showed that calcium carbonate (chalk) could be made into a material resembling marble under the action of pressure, and he showed that certain clays combined with organic matter under high pressure produced a substance like schist found in the local Belgian region. Another example of Spring's demonstrations was showing that compressing barium sulfate and sodium carbonate over extended periods of time produces barium carbonate and sodium sulfate.

Twenty-five of Spring's 150 scientific publications were on the subject of chemical transformations induced by high pressure.

=== Controversy ===
In the course of his scientific career, Spring was a part of several controversies, related to his experimental methods, his choice of words in scientific publications, and priority claims over the earliest investigations of mechanochemistry.

Beginning in 1883, criticism emerged of Spring's experimental methods relating to difficulties in reproducibility of Spring's experimental findings. Despite his mechanical skills, the pistons in his compression apparatus were not perfectly matched in diameter leading to a mechanical shear on his test specimens in addition to effects of pressure alone. The presence of trace amounts of water appeared to also affect results in the hands of different experimentalists. Spring rebutted much of the criticism and showed skeptics the reproducibility of his findings with his apparatus.

In 1887 a controversy emerged with geologist William Hallock concerning Spring's description of the process by which substances fuse or react under high pressure. The dispute came about because Hallock and others interpreted Spring's scientific reports to me that substances liquified under high pressure. Spring clarified that he only meant that the substances flowed as if they were liquids and were not true liquids.

Beginning in 1894, a dispute began between Spring and American scientist Mathew Carey Lea. In that year, Lea published a scientific article about the effects of mechanical actions on endothermic reactions which did not reference prior research by Spring. Spring challenged Lea's assertions about his findings being fundamentally new in a dispute that played out in the German scientific journal Zeitschrift für anorganische Chemie. The conflict likely was based on the distinction between the effects of mechanical action on endothermic chemical reactions compared to exothermic chemical reactions in addition to matters concerning Spring's experimental methods.

== Honors and legacy ==
Spring was nominated for the Nobel Prize in Chemistry in 1910 by Jean Krutwig.

Cape Walthère Spring in the Antarctic was named after him by the Belgian Antarctic Expedition.

The Belgian Chemical Society published Spring's collective works in 1914 to 1923.

Spring was a member of the German Chemical Society.
