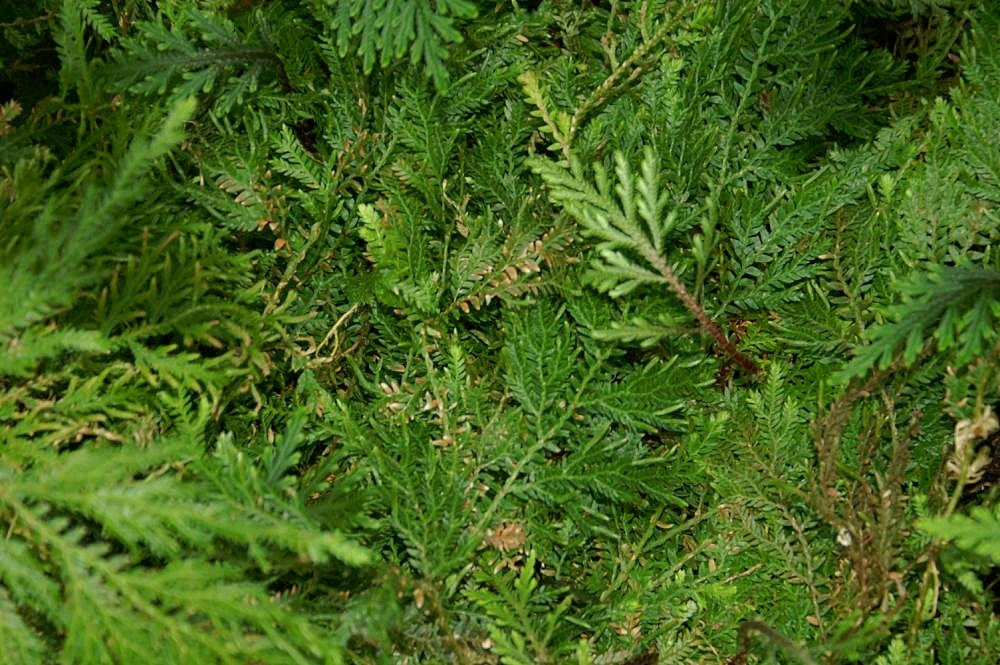

Scientific classification
- Kingdom: Plantae
- Clade: Embryophytes
- Clade: Tracheophytes
- Clade: Lycophytes
- Class: Lycopodiopsida
- Order: Selaginellales
- Family: Selaginellaceae
- Genus: Selaginella
- Species: S. stellata

Binomial name
- Selaginella stellata Spring

= Selaginella stellata =

Species of spore-bearing plant

Selaginella stellata, also recognized by its common name, starry spikemoss or starry spike-moss, is a species of spikemoss of the family Selaginellaceae. It is a type of lycopod that grows naturally in Mexico and Central American countries like Guatemala and Belize and can also be found in the state of Hawaii.

== Distribution ==
Spikemoss can be found in a number of places in a variety of climates. In North America alone, individuals of the genus Selaginella have been discovered in tropical habitats like those in Puerto Rico and the Virgin Islands as well as the more arctic habitats in areas of Greenland. Selaginella stellata in particular is native to Central America and Mexico. In the United States it was introduced to equatorial state of Hawaii. There the individuals of this species can be found along the trails ‘Akaka Falls State Park as well as the valleys of the Hamakua coast.

== Habitat and ecology ==
Members of the genus Selaginella are terrestrial plants that grow in a different types of habitats, though, most grow in damp shady areas of tropical forests. They are herbaceous and can be perennials or annuals. Starry spikemoss plants are mossy, fern-like perennials that can be found growing over cliffs and on the side of trails. According to the USDA PLANTS Database, they are considered "nonhydrophytes" and therefore can be found in wetlands but this is not considered common.

== Morphology ==
Individuals of this species are recognized by swollen joints dispersed along the main stem of the plant along with long rhizophores located on the lower third of the stem. Typically the stems of this spikemoss are straw colored and ascending or erecting from bases that lie on the ground. The branches of the plant form an open, egg-shaped pattern. Leaves of this species generally ovate but have also been narrowly oblong and lanceolate in shape and range from approximately 1-3mm in length. The strobili of these types of individuals grow to about 1–2.5 cm in length.

Starry Spikemoss plants are commonly confused with a closely related species, Selaginella galeottii. Their appearances are similar however the shape of the lateral and axillary leaves are different. Axillary and lateral leaves of Selaginella stellata tend to be eciliate and the axillary leaves are biauriculate and conspicuous. Axillary leaves of Selaginella galeottii are rarely auriculate and if they are present they are inconspicuous. Axillary and lateral leaves of Selaginella galeottii also differ in that they have cilia at their base or near their point of attachment.

== Usage ==
According to the Amazonian Ethnobotanical Dictionary, Selaginella stellata is part of a decoction called "Palillo" or "Sapo magui" that is used by Brazilians while bathing as a flu treatment.
