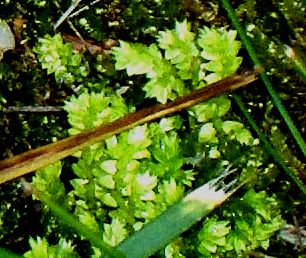

Conservation status
- Secure (NatureServe)

Scientific classification
- Kingdom: Plantae
- Clade: Tracheophytes
- Clade: Lycophytes
- Class: Lycopodiopsida
- Order: Selaginellales
- Family: Selaginellaceae
- Genus: Selaginella
- Species: S. apoda

Binomial name
- Selaginella apoda (L.) Spring

Synonyms
- Diplostachyum apodum (L.) P.Beauv. Lycopodioides apoda (L.) Kuntze; Lycopodium albidulum Sw. Lycopodium apodum L. (basionym); Selaginella albidula (Sw.) Spring List sources

= Selaginella apoda =

Meadow spikemoss

Species of spore-bearing plant

Selaginella apoda, commonly known as meadow spikemoss, is a perennial lycophyte native to much of the eastern United States and parts of northeastern Mexico. The life cycle is the shortest of the genus Selaginella, as well as one of the shortest among the lycophytes. Selaginella apoda is found primarily in damp soils in habitats such as swamps, wet fields, open woods and along stream banks. Selaginella apoda presents the potential for case studies involving the plant's adaptability to environmental toxins. It is closely related to Selaginella eclipes and S. ludoviciana, with both of which it has been reported to form hybrids. This group is characterized by relatively flat strobili and large megasporophylls which occur in the same plane as the lateral leaves.

The plant was originally described, and named Lycopodium apodum by Carl Linnaeus in his Species Plantarum (1753).

== Description ==
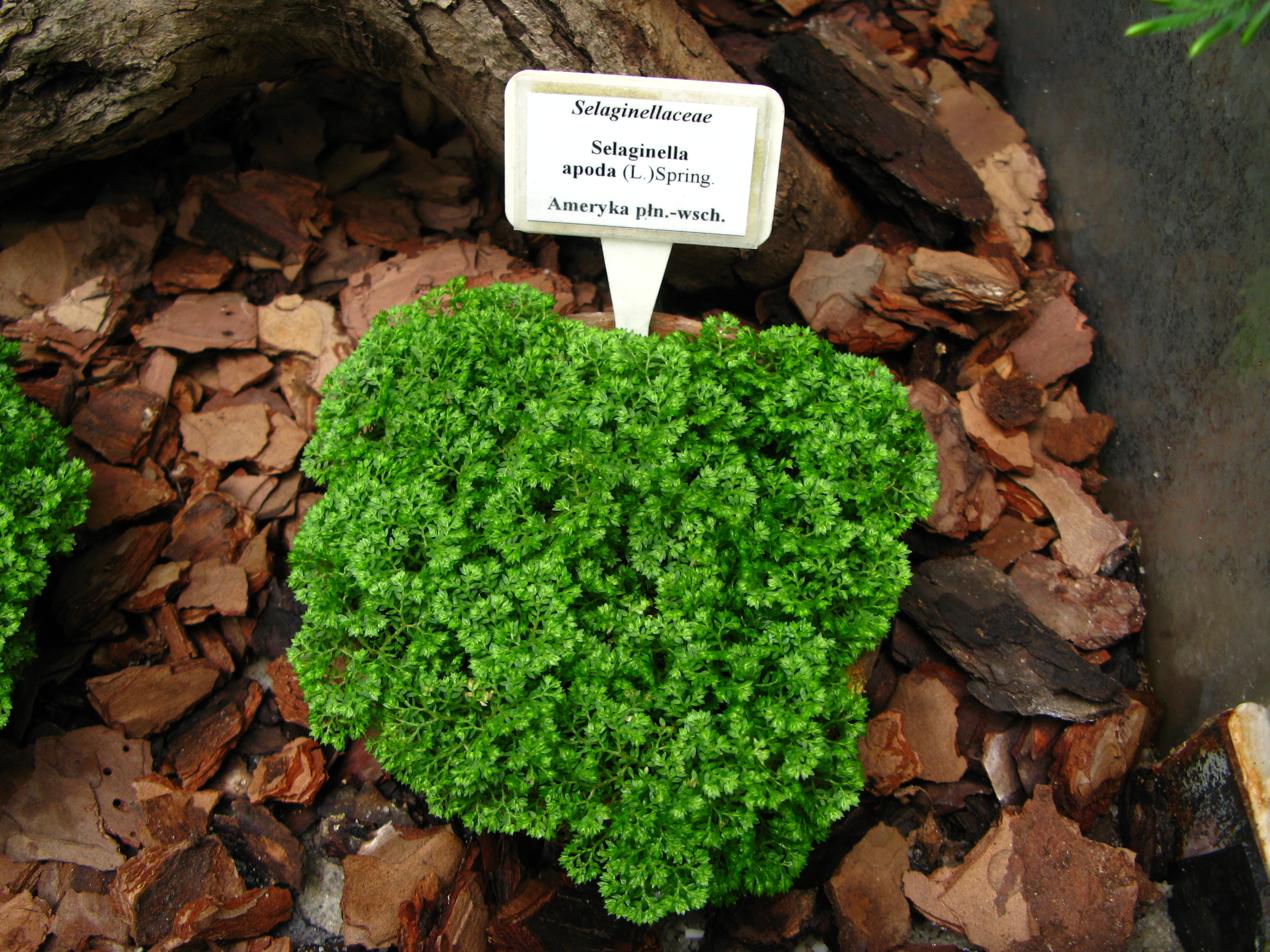

Selaginella apoda stems have smaller leaves in two rows as well as larger leaves in two rows. This species can be differentiated from a regular moss species based on its veins running along the leaves. The stem of S. apoda can best be described as leafy. Selaginella species possess rhizophores.

Many species in the genus Selaginella also demonstrate dichotomous branching. Vegetative leaves on S. apoda are lined with small teeth, have a scale-like appearance, are short in length, and change in shape and size in the same node. Selaginella apoda branches can be a maximum of 15 centimeters in height and have a creeping style. The ligule on Selaginella species can be found rising on the adaxil surfaces of leaves at their base, as well as on sporophylls. The shape of the ligule is awl-shaped and occurs singly. The leaves of S. apoda contain a cuticle layer on their adaxial surfaces and they do not have hairs on their abaxial surfaces.

The internodes of S. apoda branches can be used to classify the branches as reproductive or vegetative, as the internodes are extended on vegetative branches. Selaginella apoda adventitious and primary roots contain a root cap at their tips, have the ability to branch when growing, are white, and possess root hairs, located in close proximity to the tips. Selaginella apoda primary root system contains only three single root strands; as such, the system is ailing, for it also does not branch significantly. Adjacent to the axil, sporangia are created from artificial cells. While stomata can be found following the leaf margin on the lower surface of the plant's leaves, stomata on the upper surface of S. apoda leaves disperse entirely following the laminae.

The dorsal leaves of S. apoda have acuminate apices. The primary leaves of S. apoda significantly contrast in shape from the cotyledons of the plant. Selaginella apoda leaf blades have borders with a margin that is light green in appearance or simply identical to each other. The strobilus of S. apoda is often restricted to a length of 1-2 centimeters. Typically, the strobili of S. apoda are in an erect position. Within the sporangia, the two gametophyte forms start development. Selaginella apoda sporangia can be distinguished from other species of Selaginella in how its wall is composed of two layers instead of three.

== Taxonomy ==
The species was first described by Carl Linnaeus in 1753 as Lycopodium apodum. The specific epithet apodum is the neuter form of an adjective apodus, coined by Linnaeus, meaning "footless". When in 1840 Antoine Frédéric Spring transferred it to the genus Selaginella, he did so under the name Selaginella apus, apus being a noun used in apposition rather than Linnaeus's adjective, on the grounds that in classical Latin, there is no such adjective as apodus. In 1915, Merritt Lyndon Fernald published the name Selaginella apoda, following Linnaeus in using an adjective as the specific epithet, in this case agreeing in gender with the feminine noun Selaginella. Both names have been used.

Selaginella apoda falls under the order Selaginellales and the family Selaginellaceae, the biggest family of the lycophytes group and of which Selaginella is the single genus. The lycophytes contain over 1000 species across 10-15 extant genera. In the order Selaginellales, Selaginella also is the only living genus. Approximately 700-800 species comprise the genus Selaginella worldwide, of which about 320 can be found in the Western Hemisphere alone. Selaginella apoda is a synonym for Lycopodioides apoda as well as Lycopodium apodum. This plant species was named based on Linnaeus' observation that its strobili were stalkless.

Selaginella apoda can be subcategorized into the subgenus Stachygynandrum. The genus Selaginella has been subjected to taxonomic treatments, including the arrangement of a plant's sporangia as well as the types of spores the plant species produces. In terms of phylogenetics, S. apoda falls under the S. pallescens OPHA clade, species that are native to the American continent and have one type of sporophyll in the form of a megaspore network. In the family Selaginellaceae, microsporangia are larger than the megasporangia and the strobili are quadrangular in shape or flat. Selaginella apoda, under the synonymous name of Lycopodium apodum, can be identified by stomata spread across the plane of the adaxial sides of its leaves, the leaf margins of the plant are all similar to each other, the diameter of their megaspores within the range of 0.29 – 0.35 millimeters, and the plant has acute to attenuate apices on at least 5 of their leaves.

== Distribution and habitat ==
Minus Antarctica, Selaginella species can be found scattered across the world's continents. Selaginella apoda occurs naturally in the Midwestern and Eastern states of the United States. In the Americas, S. apoda can be found as far north as the U.S. state of Maine to as far south as Guatemala.

While studies show that it can be located across U.S. States bordering the Gulf of Mexico, greater populations occur in the Cumberland Mountains, the larger Appalachian Mountains range, and the piedmonts of these states rather than directly in coastal environments. It can grow along lake or river shores, in meadows, human-disturbed habitats, as well as in aquatic habitats such as rivers. Primarily, Selaginella apoda thrives in environments heavily shaded from the sun and with high moisture content in the soils. Such environments can include the edges of wetland marshes, oceanic cliffs, wetland meadows, bogs, along the banks of running streams, or any similar saturated environment.

== Boron effects on Selaginella ==
In a study testing the effects of boron on Selaginella species, the sporophyte heights in S. apoda demonstrated important contrasts between specimens treated with a small dose of boron and specimens without chemical treatment. The S. apoda specimens that lacked treatment with boron resulted in a yellow-green pigmentation and reduction in size, while the plant specimens chemically treated with boron demonstrated their expected green pigmentation as well as normal size. Selaginella apoda tested in the study demonstrated strobili reductions of ¼ its normal length in specimens not treated with boron than specimens treated with boron, and the boron-treated plants experienced abortion in their strobili. In the growth stages of S. apoda, boron influences reproduction.

== Ecology ==
Tropical regions have diverse Selaginella floras. Selaginella hybrid species are rare because they do not have spore dispersal methods that allow for scattering of them across great distances. Selaginella apoda megaspores may be dispersed by wind or water. It may take as few as 85 days for S. apoda to finish its life cycle. In relation to the life cycle of other species of the genus Selaginella, this time frame is much briefer.

While scientists have already concluded that the life cycle span of S. apoda is reliant in large part on the temperature of its habitat, researchers suggest that the duration of daylight may play a key role in determining the duration of the S. apoda life cycle as well. The primary root system of S. apoda is fragile. The root hairs are able to live on the roots for months and are mature on the roots prior to the root system penetrating the soil in the early growth stages. The roots, angle meristems, as well as rhizophores of S. apoda experience supplemental growth as the plant itself increases in height. This additional growth occurs in order to ensure the species does not have to transfer water in abundance while still being able to grow across a vast surface plane.

The lower surface on dorsal leaves of S. apoda, as well as the upper surface of its ventral leaves, experience sunlight exposure if the stem of the plant experiences creeping growth, while the dorsal leaves' upper surfaces and the ventral leaves' lower surfaces are pointed away from direct light exposure. Strobilus length, as well as microsporangia counts, in S. apoda are reliant on their development season in addition to the strobilus' age. Typically, S. apoda is prostrate, meaning that it lays flat on the ground.

== Cultivation ==
Due to S. apoda's simple requirements, as well as its life cycle being so short in comparison to other Selaginella species, the plant is considered a model species suitable for related scientific studies.
