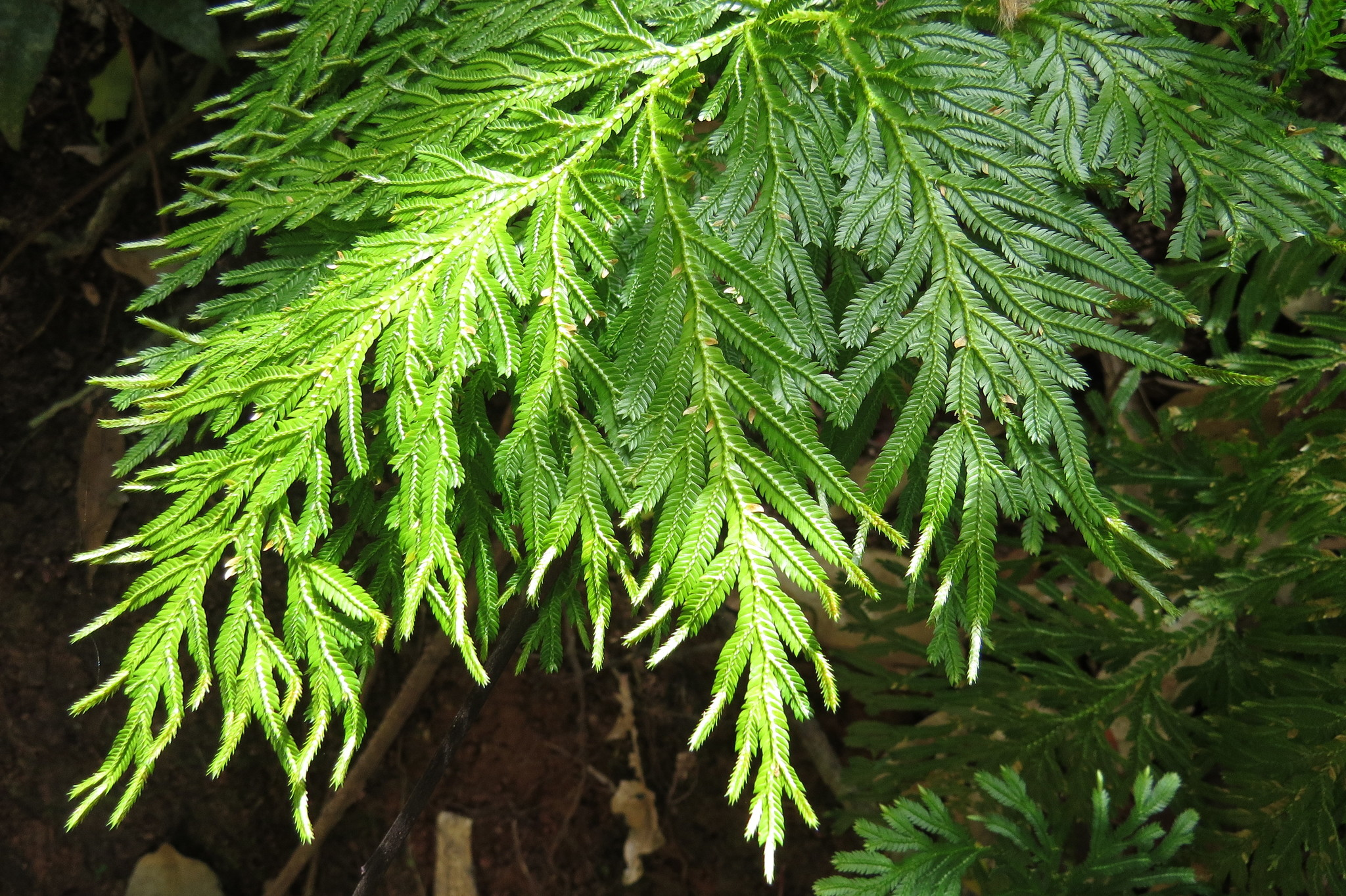

Conservation status
- Least Concern (NCA)

Scientific classification
- Kingdom: Plantae
- Clade: Tracheophytes
- Clade: Lycophytes
- Class: Lycopodiopsida
- Order: Selaginellales
- Family: Selaginellaceae
- Genus: Selaginella
- Species: S. longipinna

Binomial name
- Selaginella longipinna Warb.
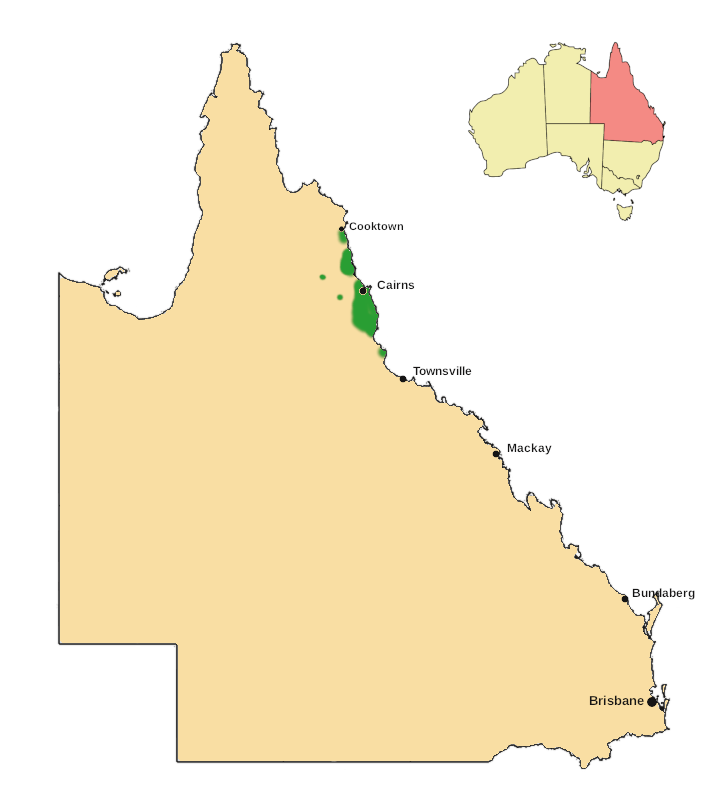

Synonyms
- Selaginella flabellata var. brevispica (Domin) F.M.Bailey; Selaginella longipinna var. brevispica Domin

= Selaginella longipinna =

electric fern

Species of spore-bearing plant

Selaginella longipinna, commonly known as the electric fern, is a plant in the spike moss family Selaginellaceae. It is endemic to northeastern Queensland, growing in rainforest and closed forest from Cooktown to near Mission Beach, including the Atherton Tablelands. It is a terrestrial plant forming a dense cover to 40 cm (16 in) high, often near streams.

== Conservation ==
This species is listed by the Queensland Department of Environment and Science as least concern. As of 7 January 2023, it has not been assessed by the IUCN.

== Gallery ==
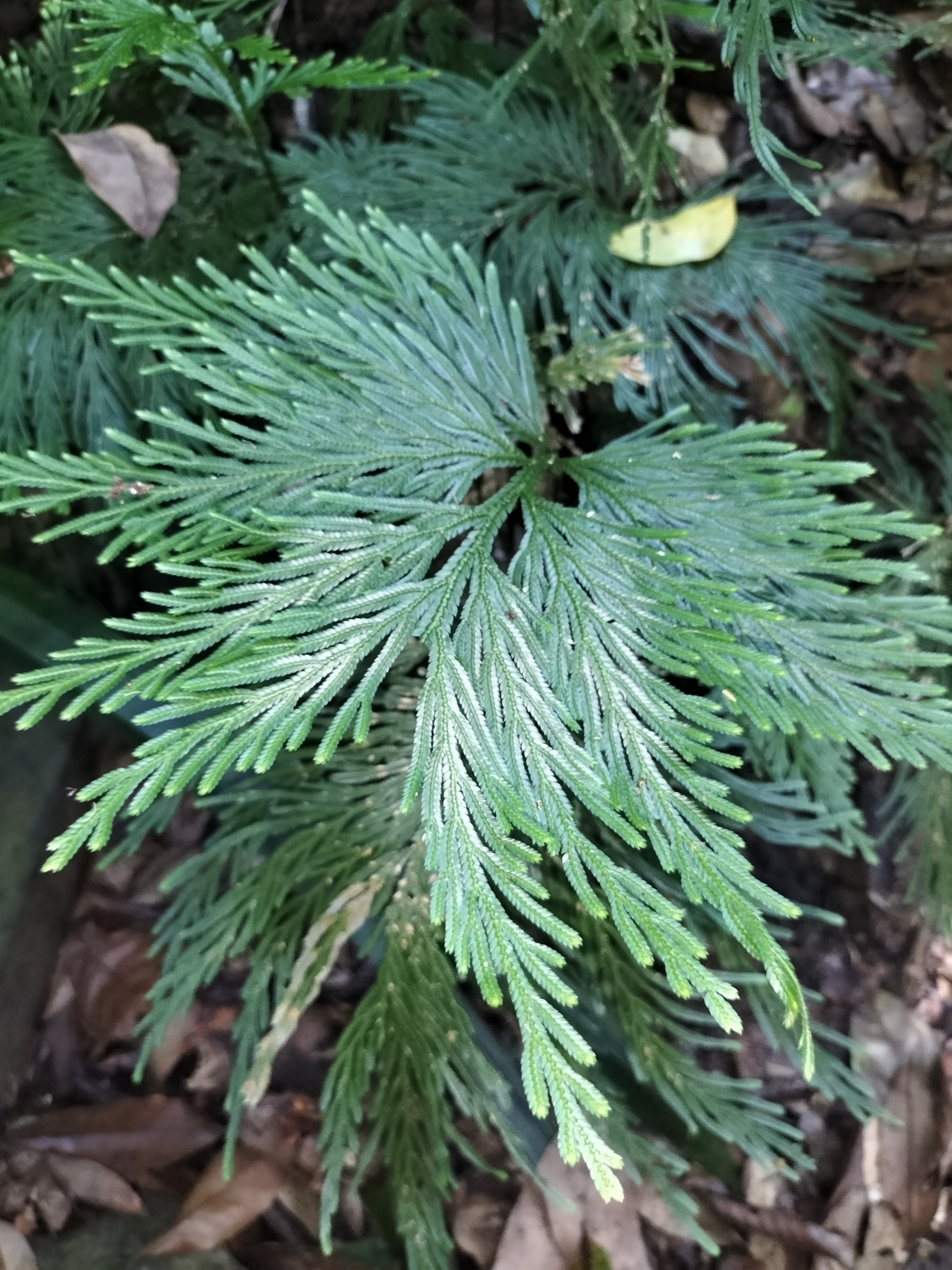

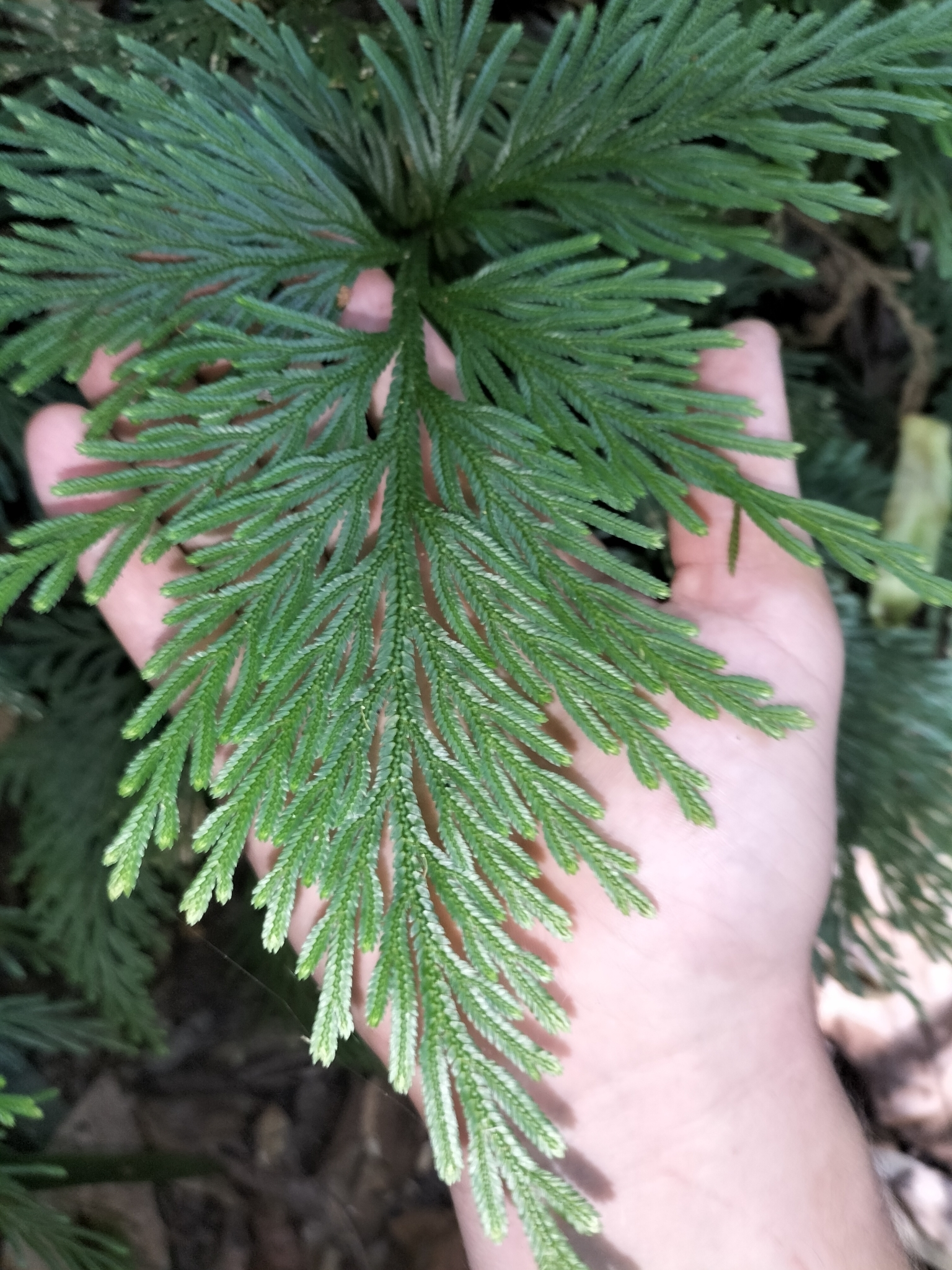

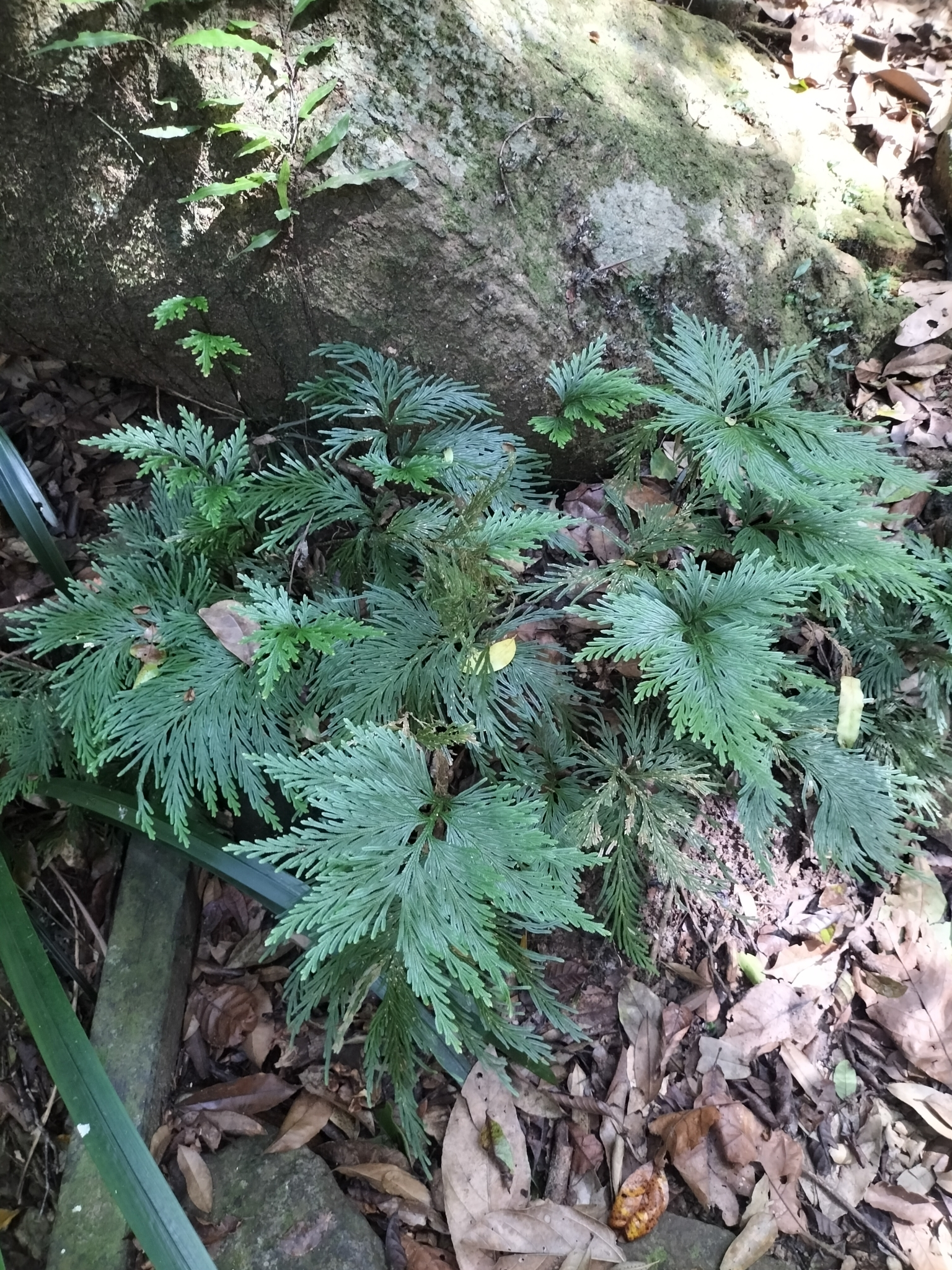

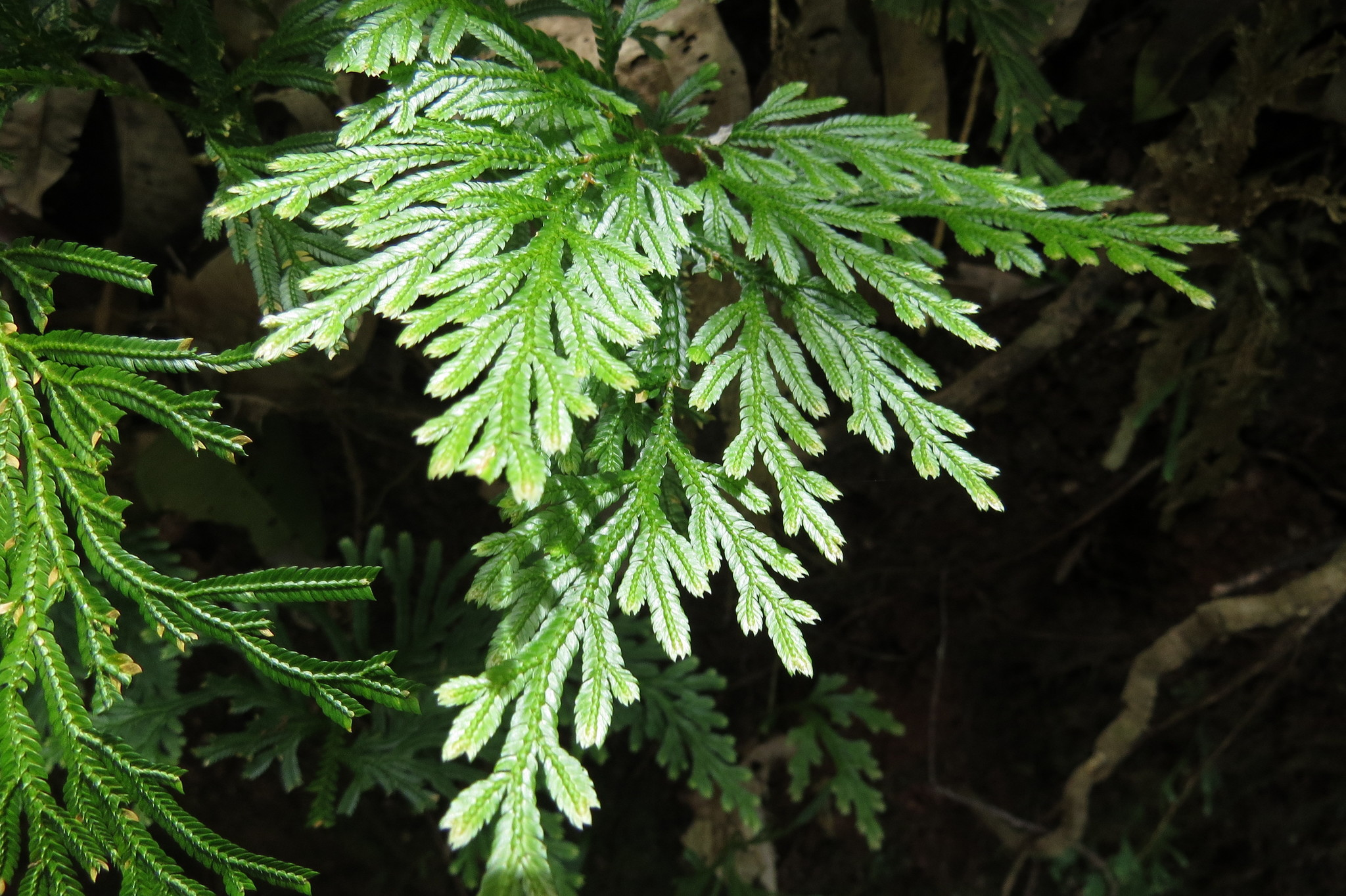
