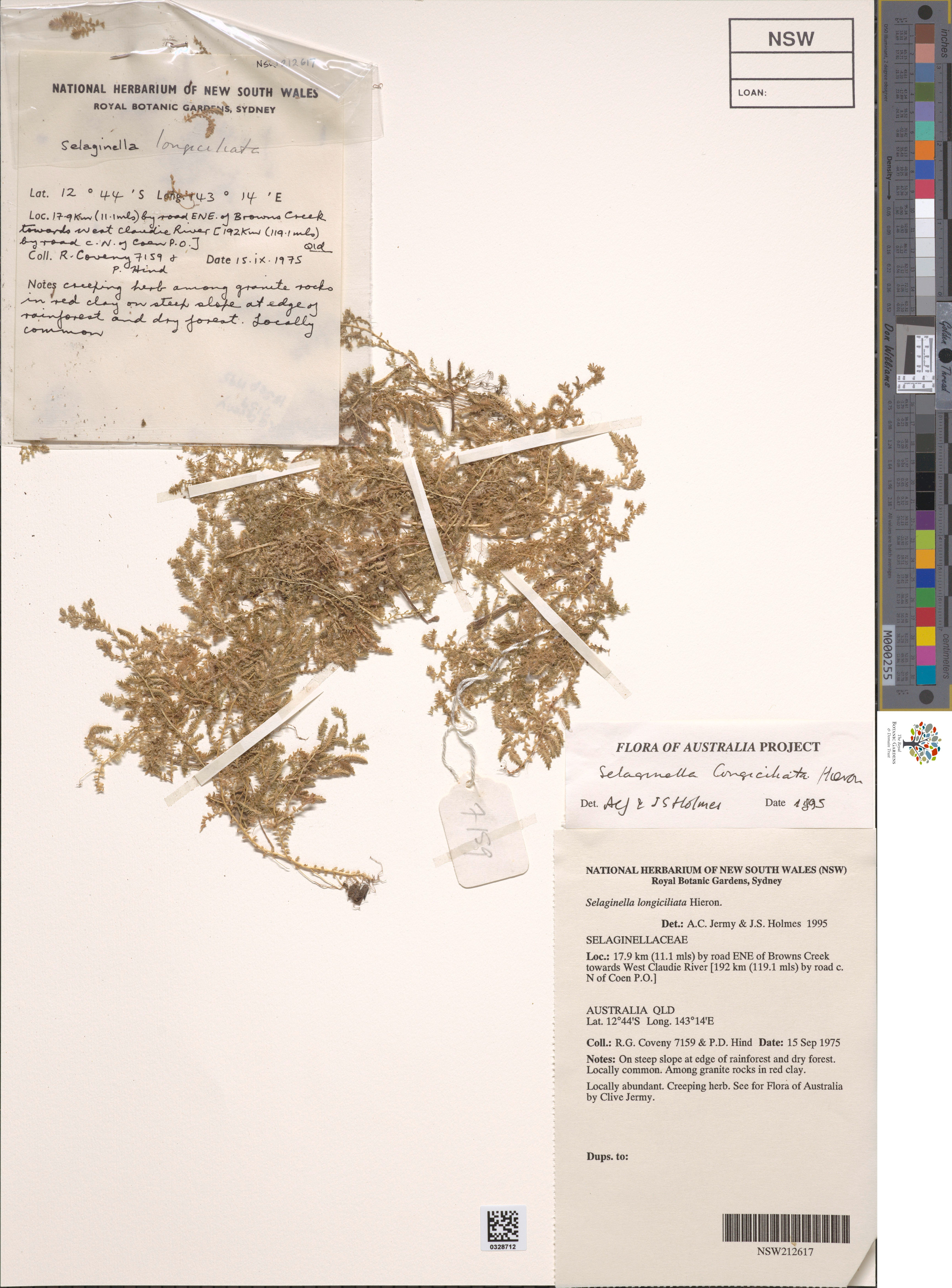
- Herbarium specimen

Conservation status
- Least Concern (NCA)

Scientific classification
- Kingdom: Plantae
- Clade: Tracheophytes
- Clade: Lycophytes
- Class: Lycopodiopsida
- Order: Selaginellales
- Family: Selaginellaceae
- Genus: Selaginella
- Species: S. longiciliata

Binomial name
- Selaginella longiciliata Hieron.

= Selaginella longiciliata =

Species of spore-bearing plant

Selaginella longiciliata is a small herbaceous plant in the family Selaginellaceae which is native to New Guinea and Australia. In Australia its natural range is restricted to a very small area in the vicinity of Lockhart River in Cape York Peninsula, Queensland, as well as on Murray Island in the Torres Strait.

== Taxonomy ==
This species was first described in 1913 by the German botanist Georg Hans Emmo Wolfgang Hieronymus, and published in 1914 in the journal Botanische Jahrbücher für Systematik, Pflanzengeschichte und Pflanzengeographie.

== Conservation ==
This species is listed by the Queensland Department of Environment and Science as least concern. As of 20 May 2023, it has not been assessed by the International Union for Conservation of Nature (IUCN).
