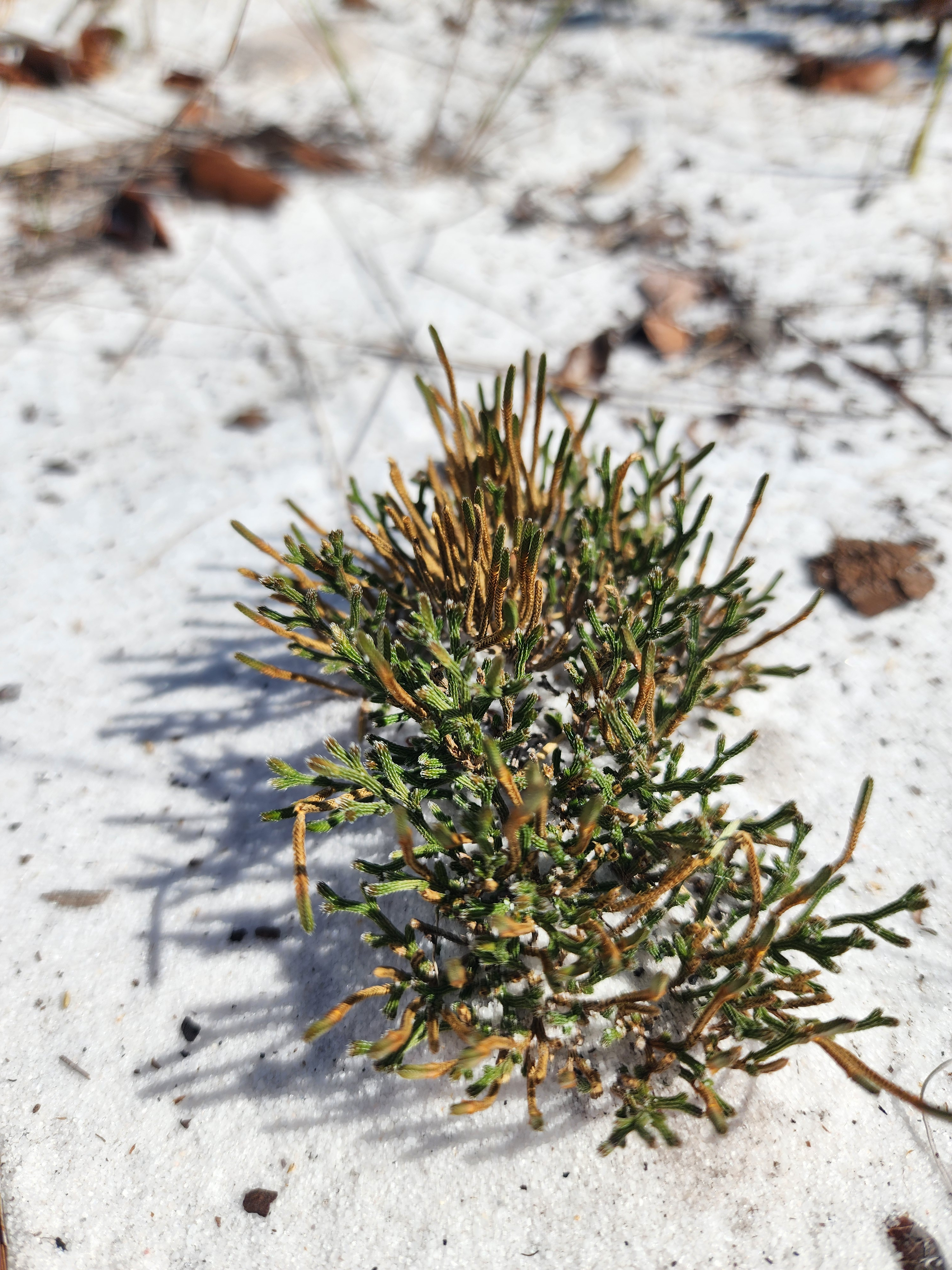

Conservation status
- Unranked (NatureServe)

Scientific classification
- Kingdom: Plantae
- Clade: Tracheophytes
- Clade: Lycophytes
- Class: Lycopodiopsida
- Order: Selaginellales
- Family: Selaginellaceae
- Genus: Selaginella
- Species: S. arenicola

Binomial name
- Selaginella arenicola Underw.

Synonyms
- Bryodesma arenicola (Underw.) Soják; Selaginella arenaria Underw.; Selaginella riddellii VanEselt.

= Selaginella arenicola =

Species of vascular plant

Selaginella arenicola, commonly called sand spikemoss, is a species (or species complex) of spikemoss, a non-flowering vascular plant, endemic to the U.S. southeast coastal plain in the states of Florida, Georgia, Alabama, and North Carolina.

== Habitat ==
It occurs in sandy, fire-dependent habitats of the southeastern U.S., including longleaf pine sandhill, Florida scrub, scrubby flatwoods, and pine rockland.

== Conservation ==
Due to its restricted habitat requirements and limited range, it is considered vulnerable in Georgia and imperiled in North Carolina.
