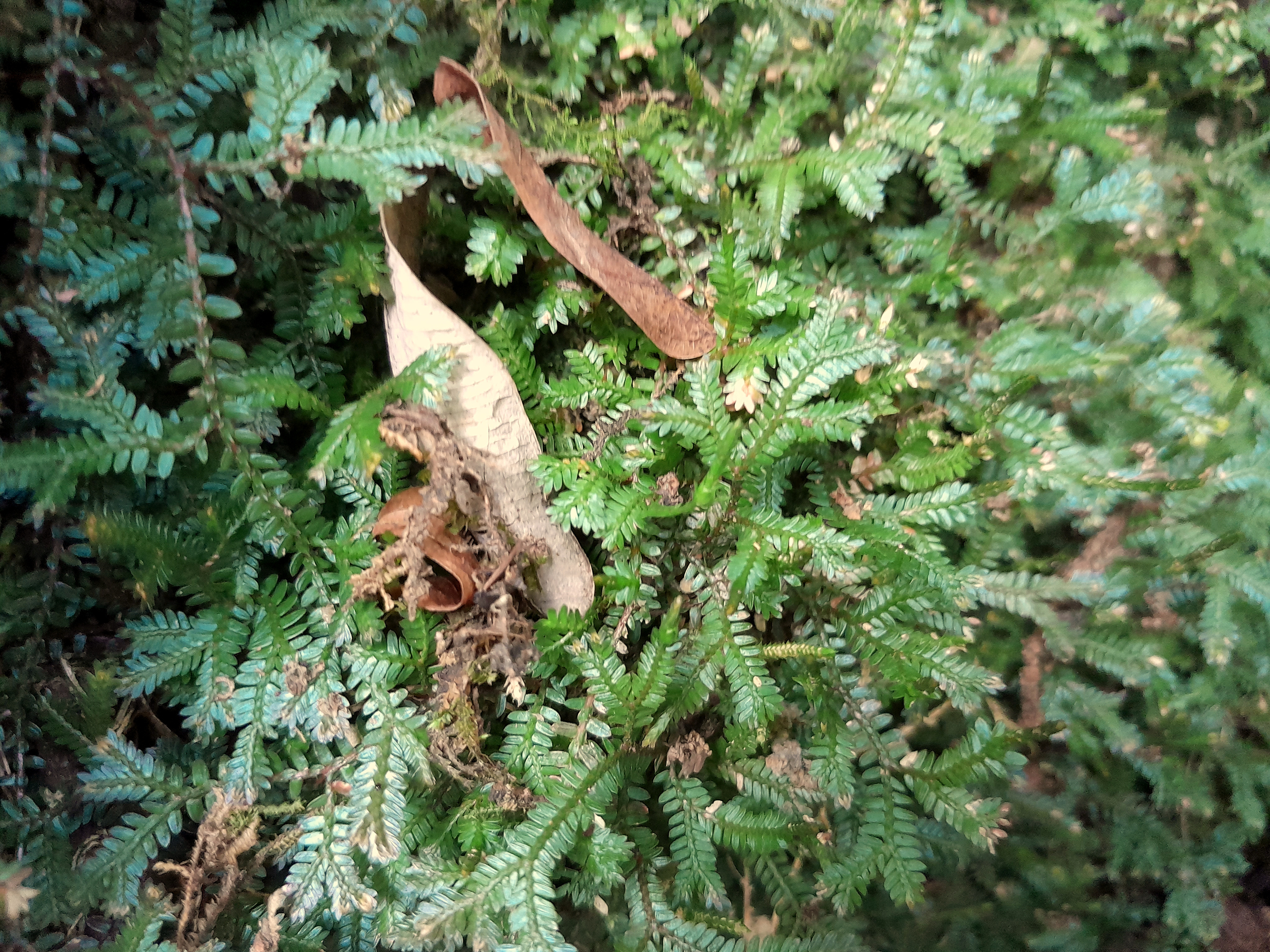

Conservation status
- Least Concern (NCA)

Scientific classification
- Kingdom: Plantae
- Clade: Tracheophytes
- Clade: Lycophytes
- Class: Lycopodiopsida
- Order: Selaginellales
- Family: Selaginellaceae
- Genus: Selaginella
- Species: S. australiensis

Binomial name
- Selaginella australiensis Baker

Synonyms
- Lycopodioides australiensis (Baker) Kuntze; Lycopodioides bakeriana (F.M.Bailey) Kuntze; Selaginella australiensis var. bakeriana (F.M.Bailey) Domin; Selaginella australiensis var. leptostachya (F.M.Bailey) Domin; Selaginella australiensis var. normalis Domin; Selaginella australiensis var. sciuroides Domin; Selaginella bakeriana F.M.Bailey; Selaginella concinna F.Muell.; Selaginella leptostachya F.M.Bailey

= Selaginella australiensis =

Species of spore-bearing plant

Selaginella australiensis is a plant in the spikemoss family Selaginellaceae endemic to northeastern Queensland. It grows in rainforest and closed forest from Cooktown to near Mission Beach, including the Atherton Tablelands. It is a low growing and much branched terrestrial plant inhabiting damp shady locations, typically along stream banks.

== Conservation ==
This species is listed by the Queensland Department of Environment and Science as least concern. As of 8 January 2023, it has not been assessed by the IUCN.

== Gallery ==
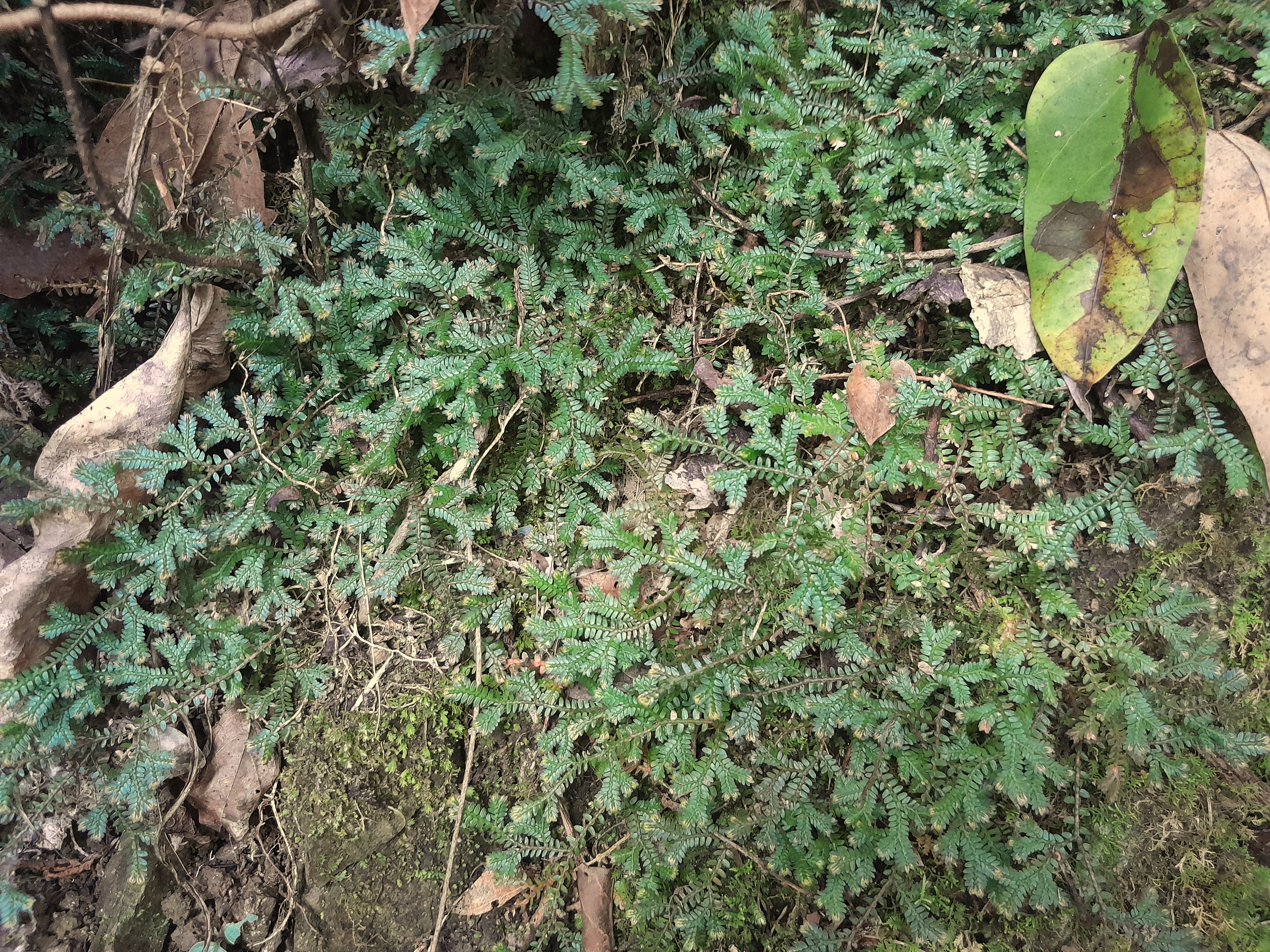

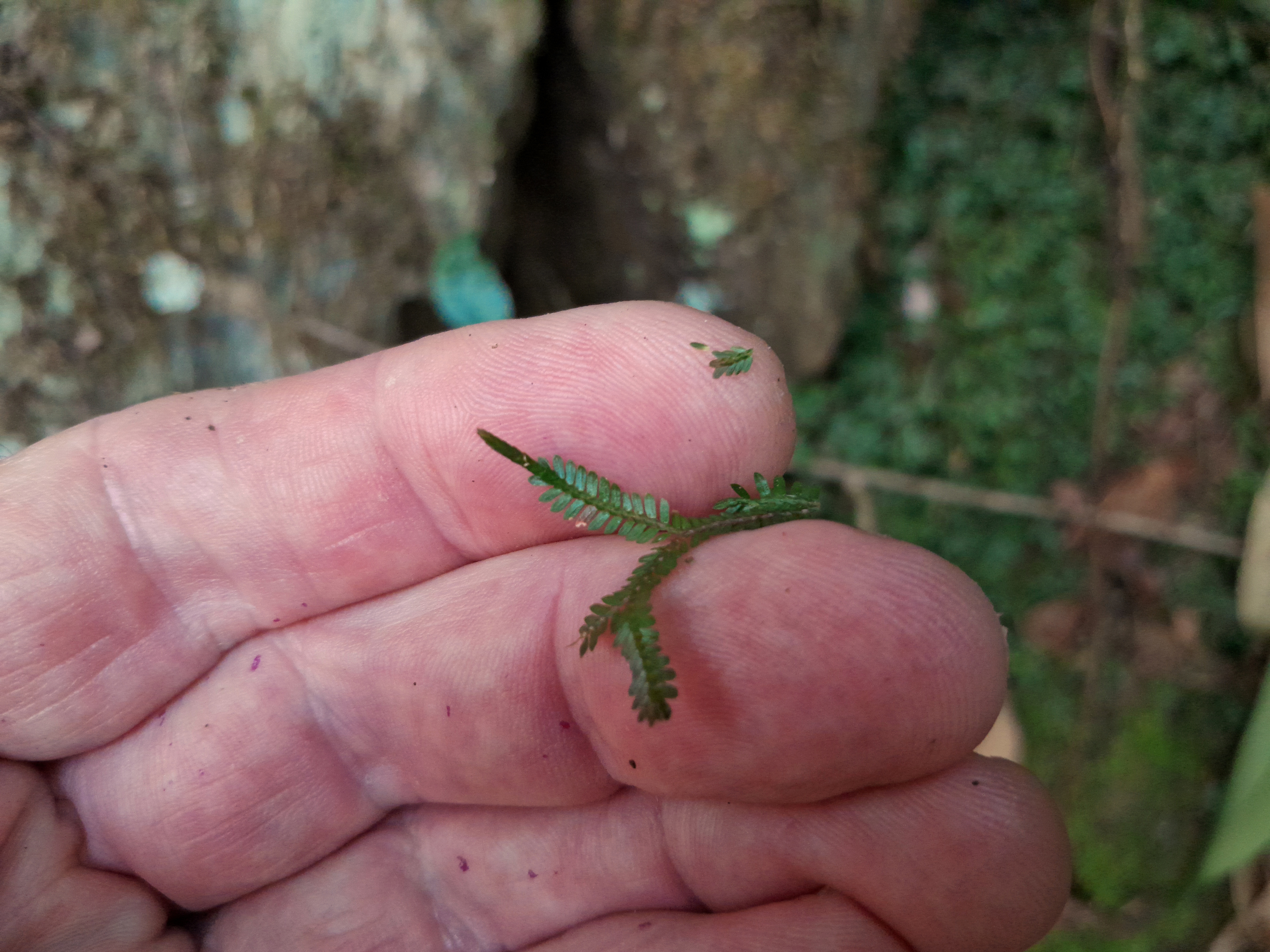

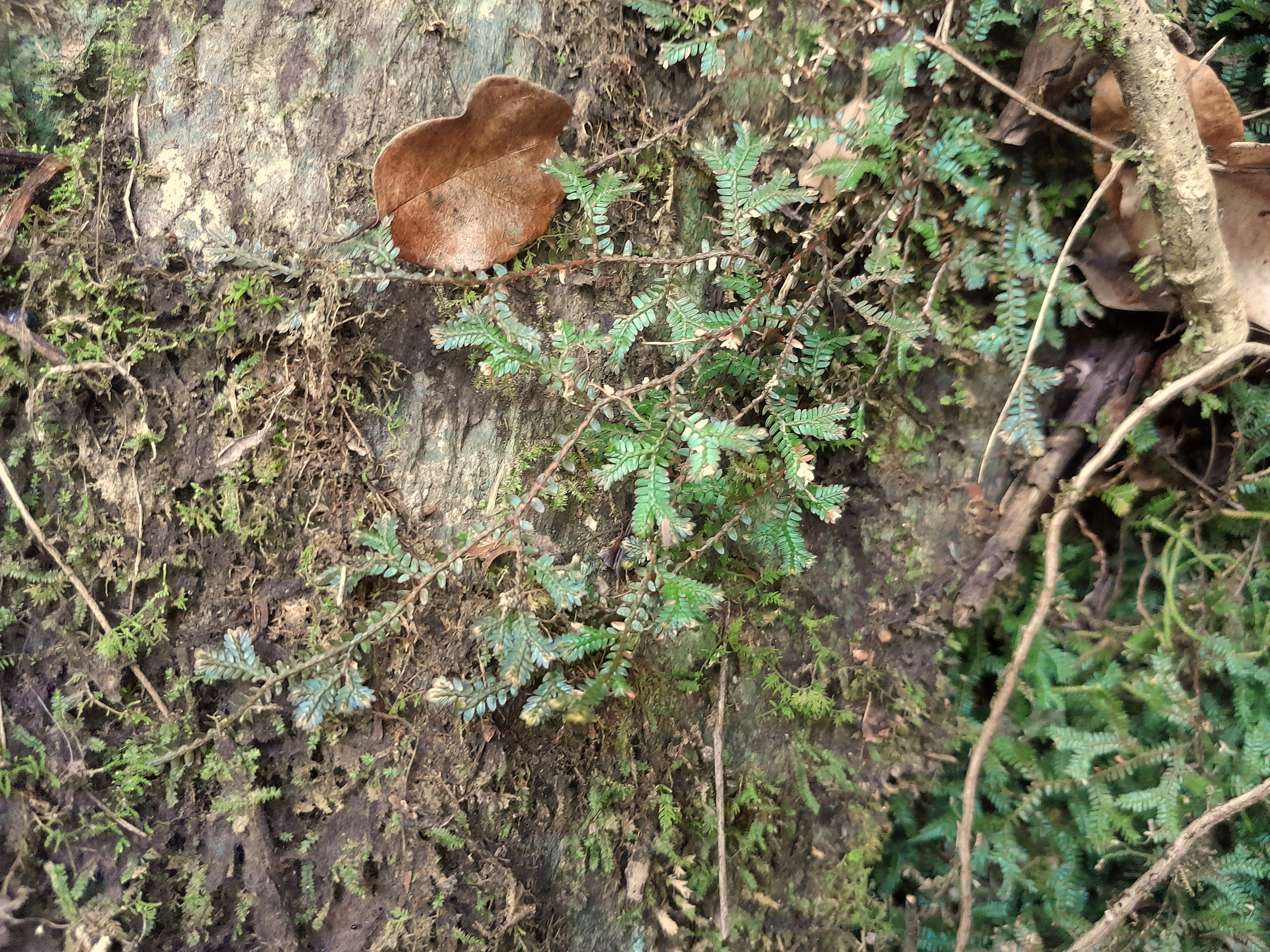
