= Selaginella ornata =

Scientific classification
- Kingdom: Plantae
- Clade: Tracheophytes
- Clade: Lycophytes
- Class: Lycopodiopsida
- Order: Selaginellales
- Family: Selaginellaceae
- Genus: Selaginella
- Species: S. ornata

Binomial name
- Selaginella ornata (Hook. & Grev.) Spring

Species of clubmoss

Selaginella ornata, commonly known as ornate clubmoss, is a species of spikemoss. It is found in the Philippines, Malaysia, Thailand, and Vietnam in forests and limestone caves/cliffs.

== Description ==
S. ornata grows to between 20-40 cm in height, with a creeping stem of 0.7-1.4 mm in diameter.
