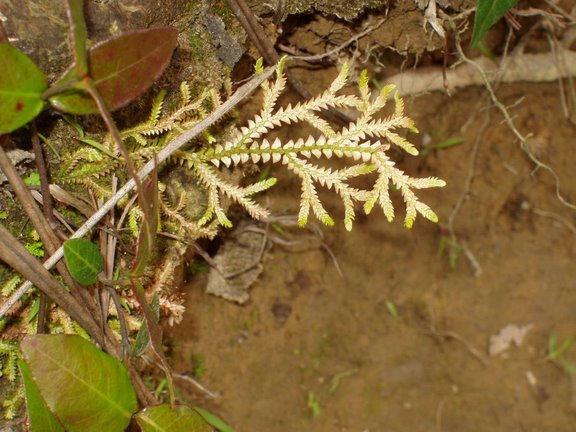

Scientific classification
- Kingdom: Plantae
- Clade: Tracheophytes
- Clade: Lycophytes
- Class: Lycopodiopsida
- Order: Selaginellales
- Family: Selaginellaceae
- Genus: Selaginella
- Species: S. heterostachys

Binomial name
- Selaginella heterostachys Baker

Synonyms
- Hypopterygiopsis heterostachys (Baker) Li Bing Zhang & X.M.Zhou; Lycopodioides heterostachys (Baker) Kuntze; Selaginella hezhangensis P.S.Wang & X.Y.Wang; Selaginella praticola Hand.-Mazz. Selaginella recurvifolia Warb. Selaginella tarokoensis Yamam.

= Selaginella heterostachys =

Species of spore-bearing plant

Selaginella heterostachys is a species of plant in the Selaginellaceae family, found in China, Taiwan, Japan, the Philippines, Vietnam, and Korea. It was first described by John Gilbert Baker in 1885.
