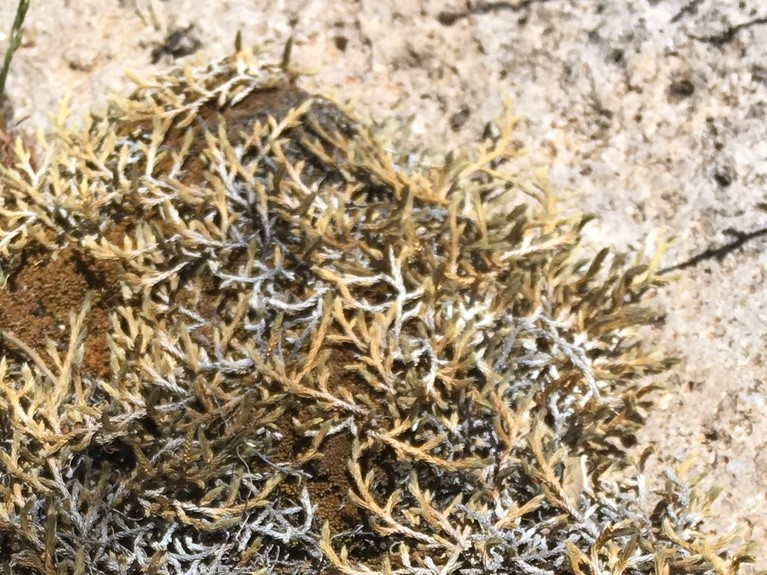

Scientific classification
- Kingdom: Plantae
- Clade: Tracheophytes
- Clade: Lycophytes
- Class: Lycopodiopsida
- Order: Selaginellales
- Family: Selaginellaceae
- Genus: Selaginella
- Species: S. × neomexicana

Binomial name
- Selaginella × neomexicana Maxon.

Synonyms
- S. mutica × S. rupincola; Bryodesma × neomexicanum (Maxon) Škoda

= Selaginella × neomexicana =

Species of plant

Selaginella × neomexicana, commonly known New Mexican spikemoss, is a hybrid species of desert vascular plant in the spikemoss family Selaginellaceae. First described by William Ralph Maxon, it is found in the south-western United States (Arizona, New Mexico and Texas).

Selaginella × neomexicana is a non-flowering, sporulating plant that grows up to about two inches (51 mm) tall. It is treated as a hybrid, lacking megaspores and megasporangia. It grows on canyon rock from 1,400 to 2,000 meters (4,600 to 6,600 ft) in elevation.
