= Antoine Frédéric Spring =

Belgian physician and botanist (1814–1872)

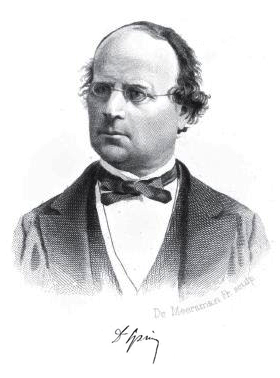
Antoine Frédéric Spring

Antoine Frédéric Spring (8 April 1814 in Gerolsbach, Bavaria – 17 January 1872) was a German-born, Belgian physician and botanist.

He studied botany and medicine at the Ludwig-Maximilians-Universität München, obtaining his PhD in 1835 and his medical doctorate during the following year. From 1839 to 1872 he was a professor at the University of Liège, initially in the fields of physiology and anatomy, later teaching classes in pathology and internal medicine.

As a botanist he specialized in research of Lycopodiaceae (clubmosses) and Selaginellaceae (spikemosses), and was the binomial author of numerous species from both families. His personal herbarium is now kept in the herbarium at the University of Liège. His son Walthère Victor Spring became a chemist who contributed to ideas on the Greenhouse Effect, as well as to physical and organic chemistry.
