= Department of the Environment, Tourism, Science and Innovation =

Queensland state government department

Department overview
- Preceding agencies: Department of Environment, Science and Innovation; Department of Environment and Science; Department of Environment and Heritage Management; Department of Environment and Resource Management
- Jurisdiction: Queensland
- Minister responsible: Andrew Powell, Minister for the Environment and Tourism and Minister for Science and Innovation
- Department executive: Patricia O’Callaghan, Acting Director-General
- Website: www.detsi.qld.gov.au

The Department of the Environment, Tourism, Science and Innovation (DETSI) is a department of the Queensland Government which is responsible for protecting the state's natural environment, developing the government's tourism, science and innovation strategy. The minister responsible for the department is Andrew Powell. The department provides administrative support for the Queensland Heritage Council and the Queensland Heritage Register.

== History ==
The Department of Environment and Heritage Protection was established in April 2012, as part of a series of changes to the machinery of government after the LNP's win at the 2012 election. The department took on most of the functions of the Department of Environment and Resource Management which was dissolved. In December 2017, it was renamed to the Department of Environment and Science. In December 2023, it was renamed to the Department of Environment, Science and Innovation. In November 2024, it was renamed to the Department of the Environment, Tourism, Science and Innovation.

== Ministers ==
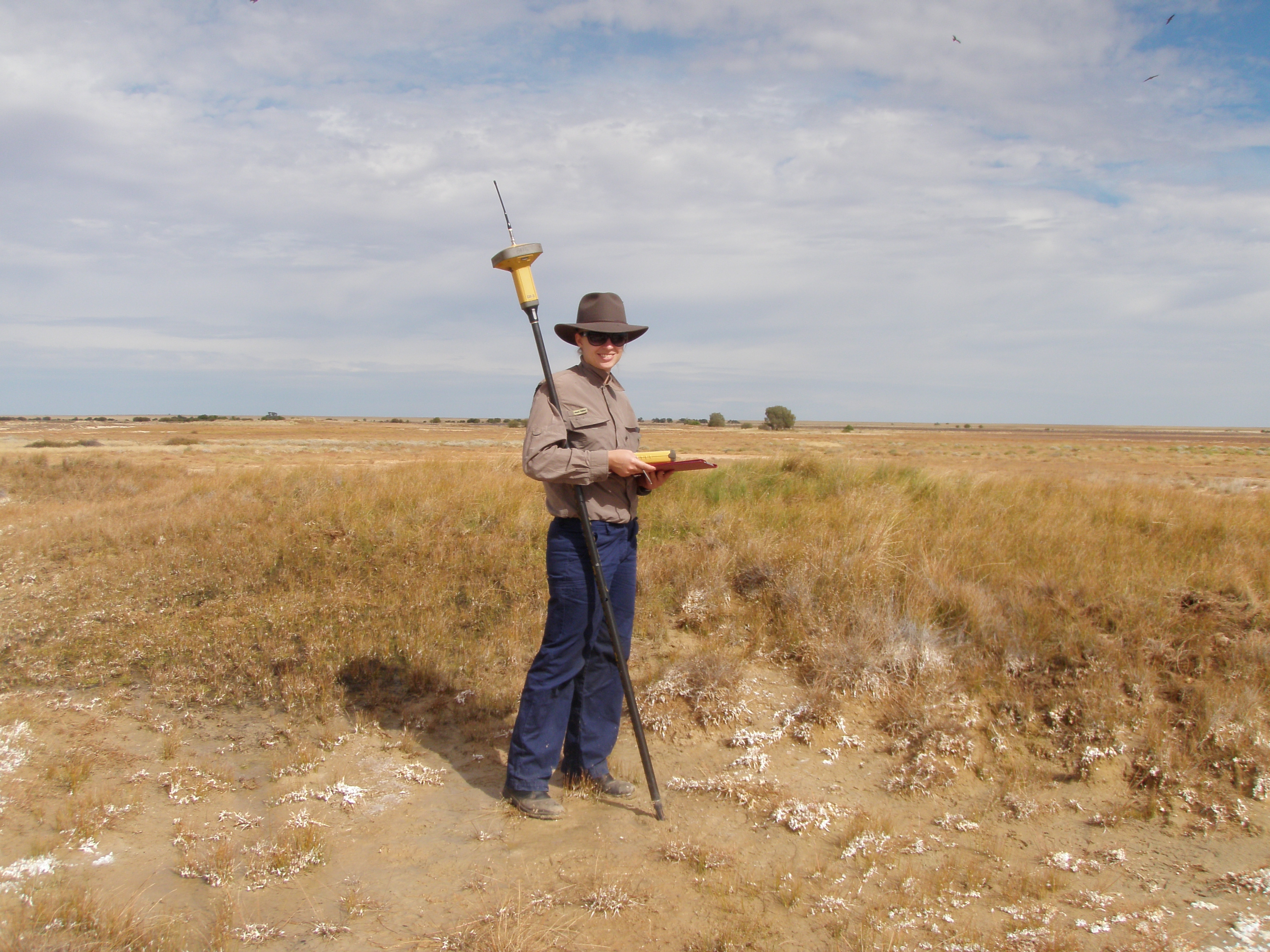
An employee monitoring the Great Artesian Basin

Ministers for this department (and similar predecessors) include:

Start	End	Minister	Title
23 December 1980	4 August 1983	Bill Hewitt	Minister for Environment, Valuation and Administrative Services
5 August 1983	18 August 1983	Col Miller	Minister for Environment, Valuation and Administrative Services
19 August 1983	6 February 1986	Martin Tenni	Minister for Environment, Valuation and Administrative Services
6 February 1986	1 December 1986	Brian Austin	Minister for Environment and Heritage
25 November 1987	1 December 1987	Kev Lingard	Minister for Health and Environment
9 December 1987	19 January 1989	Geoff Muntz	Minister for Environment, Conservation and Tourism
19 January 1989	25 September 1989	Geoff Muntz	Minister for Environment, Conservation and Forestry
25 September 1989	7 December 1989	Paul Clauson	Minister for Heritage and the Arts
25 September 1989	7 December 1989	Rob Borbidge	Minister for Tourism, Environment, Conservation and Forestry
7 December 1989	24 September 1992	Pat Comben	Minister for Environment and Heritage
24 September 1992	31 July 1995	Molly Robson	Minister for Environment and Heritage
31 July 1995	19 February 1996	Tom Barton	Minister for Environment and Heritage
26 February 1996	26 June 1998	Brian Littleproud	Minister for Environment
29 June 1998	22 February 2001	Rod Welford	Minister for Environment and Heritage
22 February 2001	12 February 2004	Dean Wells	Minister for Environment
12 February 2004	25 August 2004	John Mickel	Minister for Environment
25 August 2004	13 September 2006	Desley Boyle	Minister for Environment, Local Government, Planning and Women
13 September 2006	1 September 2007	Lindy Nelson-Carr	Minister for Environment and Multiculturalism
21 February 2011	22 June 2011	Kate Jones	Minister for Environment and Resource Management
22 June 2011	26 March 2012	Vicky Darling	Minister for Environment
26 March 2012	3 April 2012	Jeff Seeney	Minister for Environment
3 April 2012	13 February 2015	Andrew Powell	Minister for Environment and Heritage Protection
2015	2017	Steven Miles	Minister for Environment and Heritage Protection
12 December 2017	11 November 2020	Leeanne Enoch	Minister for Environment and Science and the Great Barrier Reef, Minister for Science and Minister for the Arts
11 November 2020	18 May 2023	Meaghan Scanlon	Minister for the Environment and the Great Barrier Reef, Minister for Science and Youth Affairs
18 May 2023	28 October 2024	Leanne Linard	Minister for the Environment and the Great Barrier Reef, Minister for Science and Minister for Multicultural Affairs
1 November 2024	Incumbent	Andrew Powell	Minister for the Environment and Tourism and Minister for Science and Innovation

== See also ==
- Environment of Australia
- Protected areas of Queensland
