= Inflexa =

Inflexa may refer to:

- Hyperaspis inflexa
- Succisella inflexa
- Disa inflexa
- Cavolinia inflexa
- Ramalina inflexa
- Aerides inflexa
- Moorasura inflexa
- Crassispira inflexa
- Anisia inflexa
- Hyposmocoma inflexa
- Neosciadella inflexa
- Terebra inflexa
- Lepidotis inflexa
- Utricularia inflexa
- Boronia inflexa
- Tachina inflexa
- Pterolophia kaleea inflexa
