= Hyperaspis cincta =

Scientific classification
- Kingdom: Animalia
- Phylum: Arthropoda
- Clade: Pancrustacea
- Class: Insecta
- Order: Coleoptera
- Suborder: Polyphaga
- Infraorder: Cucujiformia
- Family: Coccinellidae
- Genus: Hyperaspis
- Species: H. cincta

Binomial name
- Hyperaspis cincta LeConte, 1858

Species of beetle

Hyperaspis cincta is a species of lady beetle in the family Coccinellidae. It is found in North America, where it has been recorded from California and Utah.

== Description ==
Adults reach a length of about 2.0-2.60 mm. Adults are similar to Hyperaspis inflexa, but the marginal vitta on the elytron is wider.
