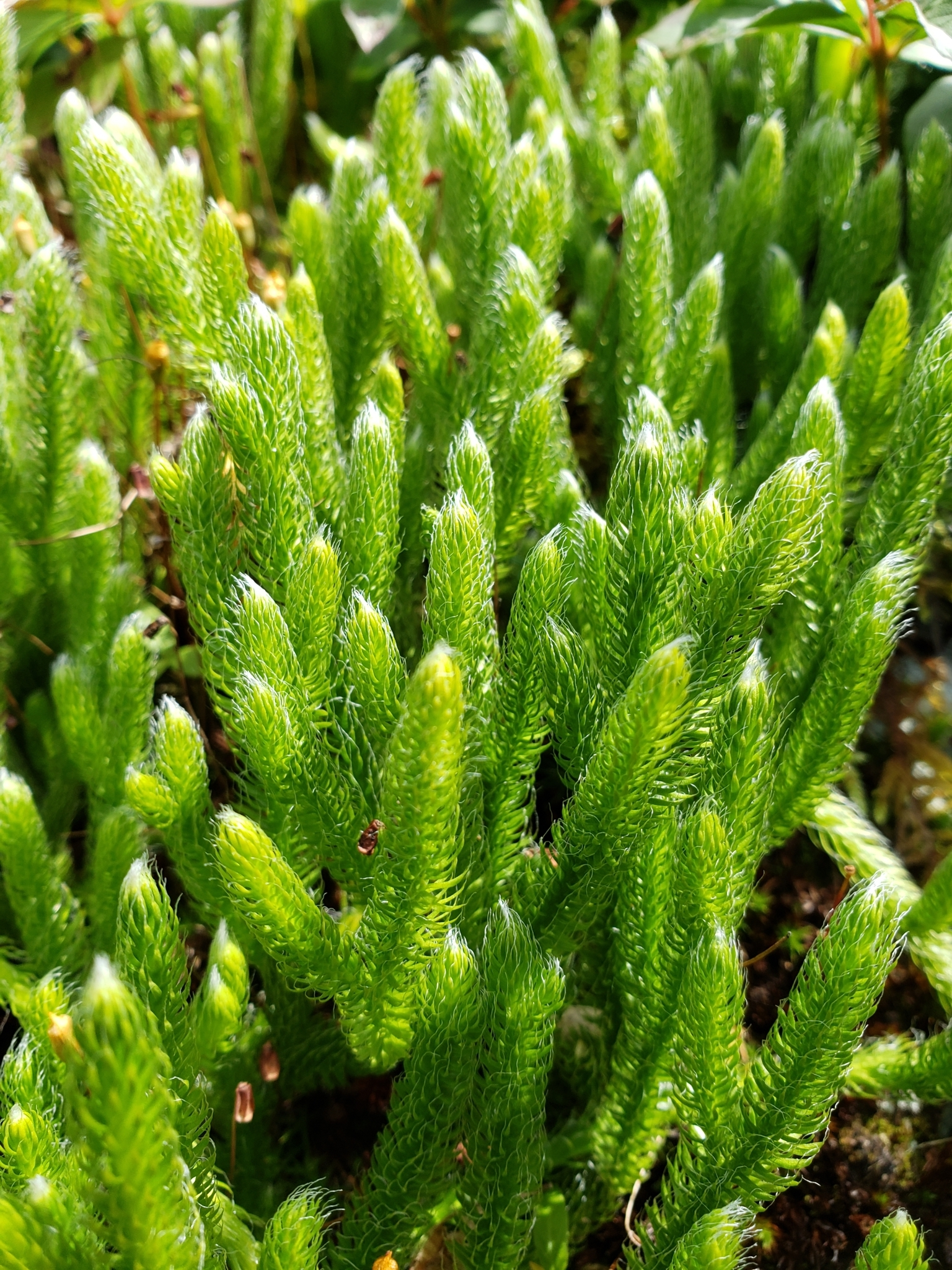

Scientific classification
- Kingdom: Plantae
- Clade: Tracheophytes
- Clade: Lycophytes
- Class: Lycopodiopsida
- Order: Lycopodiales
- Family: Lycopodiaceae
- Genus: Lycopodium
- Species: L. lagopus

Binomial name
- Lycopodium lagopus (Laest. ex C.Hartm.) Zinserl. ex Kuzen

Synonyms
- Synonymy: Lycopodium clavatum var. lagopus Laest. ex C. Hartm; Lycopodium clavatum subsp. monostachyon (Hook. & Grev.) Sel.; Lycopodium integrifolium Goldie; Lycopodium pseudo-annotinum Schur

= Lycopodium lagopus =

Species of spore-bearing plant

Lycopodium lagopus, commonly known as one-cone club-moss, is an arctic and subarctic species of plants in the genus Lycopodium in the clubmoss family. It is widespread in cold, northerly regions: Canada, Greenland, Russia, Scandinavia, and the northern United States including Alaska.

Lycopodium lagopus is very similar to L. clavatum except that it rarely has more than one cone per stem. There has been no evidence of the two interbreeding, even though they can sometimes be found growing next to each other.
