= Lycopod (disambiguation) =

Lycopod may refer to a member of

- the lycophytes, defined broadly to include the extinct zosterophylls
- the class Lycopodiopsida as defined in the Pteridophyte Phylogeny Group classification of 2016, extant lycophytes and their close extinct relatives
- the family Lycopodiaceae, the clubmosses; the sole family in the order Lycopodiales
- the genus Lycopodium
