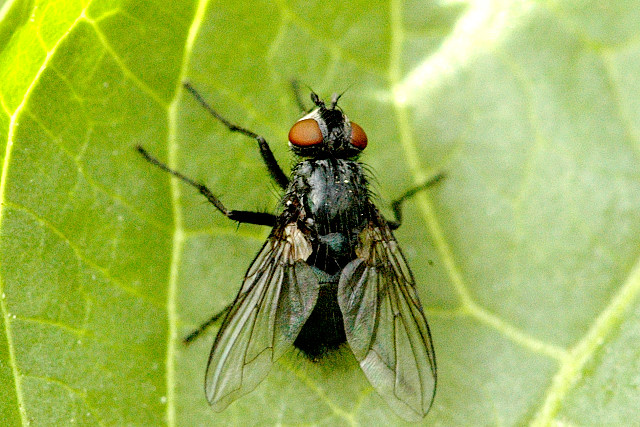
- Blondelia nigripes

Scientific classification
- Kingdom: Animalia
- Phylum: Arthropoda
- Class: Insecta
- Order: Diptera
- Family: Tachinidae
- Subfamily: Exoristinae
- Tribe: Blondeliini
- Genus: Blondelia; Robineau-Desvoidy, 1830

Type species
- Blondelia nitida Robineau-Desvoidy, 1830

Synonyms
- Cephaloplagia Reinhard, 1964; Gervaisia Robineau-Desvoidy, 1863; Lophyromyia Brauer & von Berganstamm, 1889; Phoeniciomyia Townsend, 1915; Phrynolydella Townsend, 1919; Pseudoeribea Townsend, 1926; Schaumia Robineau-Desvoidy, 1863; Spinolia Robineau-Desvoidy, 1863

= Blondelia =

Genus of flies

Blondelia is a genus of flies in the family Tachinidae.

== Species ==
- Blondelia albopilosa (Curran, 1926)
- Blondelia angusticornis Herting, 1987
- Blondelia arizonica (Townsend, 1915)
- Blondelia breviceps Shima, 1984
- Blondelia eufitchiae (Townsend, 1892)
- Blondelia flaviventris (Macquart, 1844)
- Blondelia hyphantriae (Tothill, 1922)
- Blondelia inclusa (Hartig, 1838)
- Blondelia incompleta (Curran, 1928)
- Blondelia nigripes (Fallén, 1810)
- Blondelia obconica (Walker, 1853)
- Blondelia paradexoides (Townsend, 1926)
- Blondelia piniariae (Hartig, 1838)
- Blondelia polita (Townsend, 1919)
- Blondelia prudens (Curran, 1934)
- Blondelia pulchelia (Curran, 1934)
- Blondelia sodalis (Wulp, 1890)
- Blondelia tantilla (Wulp, 1890)
- Blondelia tibialis Mesnil, 1962
- Blondelia verticale (Curran, 1934)
- Blondelia vexillaria (Villeneuve, 1922)
