= Neosciadella =

Scientific classification
- Kingdom: Animalia
- Phylum: Arthropoda
- Class: Insecta
- Order: Coleoptera
- Suborder: Polyphaga
- Infraorder: Cucujiformia
- Family: Cerambycidae
- Tribe: Acanthocinini
- Genus: Neosciadella

Genus of beetles

Neosciadella is a genus of beetles in the family Cerambycidae, containing the following species:

- Neosciadella brunnipes Dillon & Dillon, 1952
- Neosciadella cordata Dillon & Dillon, 1952
- Neosciadella fulgida Dillon & Dillon, 1952
- Neosciadella immaculosa Dillon & Dillon, 1952
- Neosciadella inflexa Dillon & Dillon, 1952
- Neosciadella multivittata Dillon & Dillon, 1952
- Neosciadella obliquata Dillon & Dillon, 1952
- Neosciadella quadripustulata Dillon & Dillon, 1952
- Neosciadella spixi Dillon & Dillon, 1952
