= Blondelia arizonica =

Scientific classification
- Kingdom: Animalia
- Phylum: Arthropoda
- Class: Insecta
- Order: Diptera
- Family: Tachinidae
- Subfamily: Exoristinae
- Tribe: Blondeliini
- Genus: Blondelia
- Species: B. arizonica

Binomial name
- Blondelia arizonica (Townsend, 1915)

Synonyms
- Cephaloplagia nubecula Reinhard, 1964; Phoeniciomyia arizonica Townsend, 1915

Species of fly

Blondelia arizonica is a species of fly in the family Tachinidae.

== Distribution ==
United States.
