= Blondelia inclusa =

Scientific classification
- Kingdom: Animalia
- Phylum: Arthropoda
- Clade: Pancrustacea
- Class: Insecta
- Order: Diptera
- Family: Tachinidae
- Subfamily: Exoristinae
- Tribe: Blondeliini
- Genus: Blondelia
- Species: B. inclusa

Binomial name
- Blondelia inclusa (Hartig, 1838)

Synonyms
- Lophyromyia clausa Brauer & von Berganstamm, 1889; Schaumia desvoidyi Townsend, 1919; Tachina inclusa Hartig, 1838

Species of fly

Blondelia inclusa is a species of fly in the family Tachinidae.

== Distribution ==
Czech Republic, Estonia, Hungary, Lithuania, Poland, Slovakia, Ukraine, Denmark, Norway, Sweden, Bulgaria, Italy, Serbia, Austria, Germany, Netherlands, Switzerland, Russia, China.
