= Blondelia piniariae =

Scientific classification
- Kingdom: Animalia
- Phylum: Arthropoda
- Class: Insecta
- Order: Diptera
- Family: Tachinidae
- Subfamily: Exoristinae
- Tribe: Blondeliini
- Genus: Blondelia
- Species: B. piniariae

Binomial name
- Blondelia piniariae (Hartig, 1838)

Synonyms
- Tachina piniariae Hartig, 1838

Species of fly

Blondelia piniariae is a species of fly in the family Tachinidae.

== Distribution ==
Czech Republic, Poland, Slovakia, Denmark, Sweden, Germany, Netherlands, Russia.
