= Lycopodium japonicum =

Scientific classification
- Kingdom: Plantae
- Clade: Tracheophytes
- Clade: Lycophytes
- Class: Lycopodiopsida
- Order: Lycopodiales
- Family: Lycopodiaceae
- Genus: Lycopodium
- Species: L. japonicum

Binomial name
- Lycopodium japonicum Thunb.

Synonyms
- Stachygynandrum japonicum (Thunb.) P.Beauv.

Species of spore-bearing plant

Lycopodium japonicum is a common species of plant in the genus Lycopodium in the clubmoss family. It is widespread in China, Japan and countries of Southern Asia. It has been used in traditional Chinese medicine for the treatment of sprains, strains and myasthenia, and research is ongoing into its efficacy. A type of alkaloid with an unusual structure, labelled lycojaponicumins A through E, were isolated from the plant in 2012.

Chemical structures of lycojaponicumins A, B, and C
