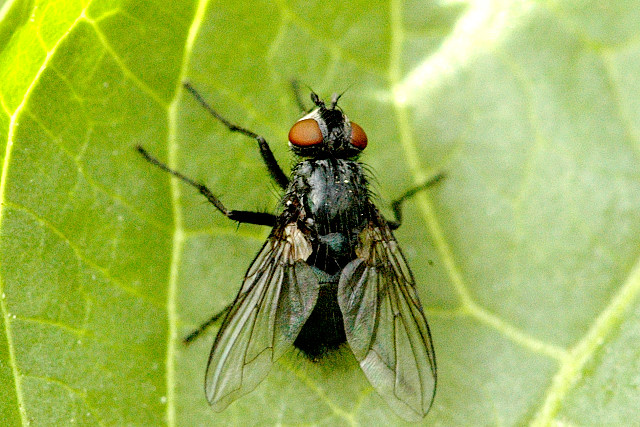
- Blondelia nigripes

Scientific classification
- Kingdom: Animalia
- Phylum: Arthropoda
- Class: Insecta
- Order: Diptera
- Family: Tachinidae
- Subfamily: Exoristinae
- Tribe: Blondeliini
- Genus: Blondelia
- Species: B. nigripes

Binomial name
- Blondelia nigripes (Fallén, 1810)

Synonyms
- Blondelia nitida Robineau-Desvoidy, 1830; Dexodes machairopsis Brauer & von Berganstamm, 1889; Masicera virilis Rondani, 1861; Masicera nitens Macquart, 1851; Masicera pinetorum Macquart, 1851; Musca pinivorae Ratzeburg, 1844; Tachina agilis Meigen, 1824; Tachina bibens Meigen, 1824; Tachina geometrae Brischke, 1885; Tachina gracilistylum Macquart, 1854; Tachina ignota Perris, 1852; Tachina inflexa Bouché, 1834; Tachina nigripes Fallén, 1810; Tachina offusa Meigen, 1824; Tachina omnivora Brischke, 1885; Tachina opaca Meigen, 1824; Tachina testaceolateralis Macquart, 1854

= Blondelia nigripes =

Species of fly

Blondelia nigripes is a species of fly in the family Tachinidae.

== Distribution ==
British Isles, Belarus, Czech Republic, Estonia, Hungary, Latvia, Lithuania, Moldova, Poland, Romania, Slovakia, Ukraine, Denmark, Finland, Norway, Sweden, Bulgaria, Corse, Croatia, Italy, Macedonia, Portugal, Serbia, Slovenia, Spain, Turkey, Yugoslavia, Austria, Belgium, France, Germany, Netherlands, Switzerland, Japan, South Korea, Iran, Mongolia, Russia, Transcaucasia, China, introduced to the United States.
