= Pterolophia kaleea =

Scientific classification
- Kingdom: Animalia
- Phylum: Arthropoda
- Clade: Pancrustacea
- Class: Insecta
- Order: Coleoptera
- Suborder: Polyphaga
- Infraorder: Cucujiformia
- Family: Cerambycidae
- Genus: Pterolophia
- Species: P. kaleea

Binomial name
- Pterolophia kaleea (Bates, 1866)

Synonyms
- Praonetha kaleea Bates, 1866

Species of beetle

Pterolophia kaleea is a species of beetle in the family Cerambycidae. It was described by Henry Walter Bates in 1866, originally under the genus Praonetha.

== Subspecies ==
- Pterolophia kaleea kaleea (Bates, 1866)
- Pterolophia kaleea inflexa Gressitt, 1940
