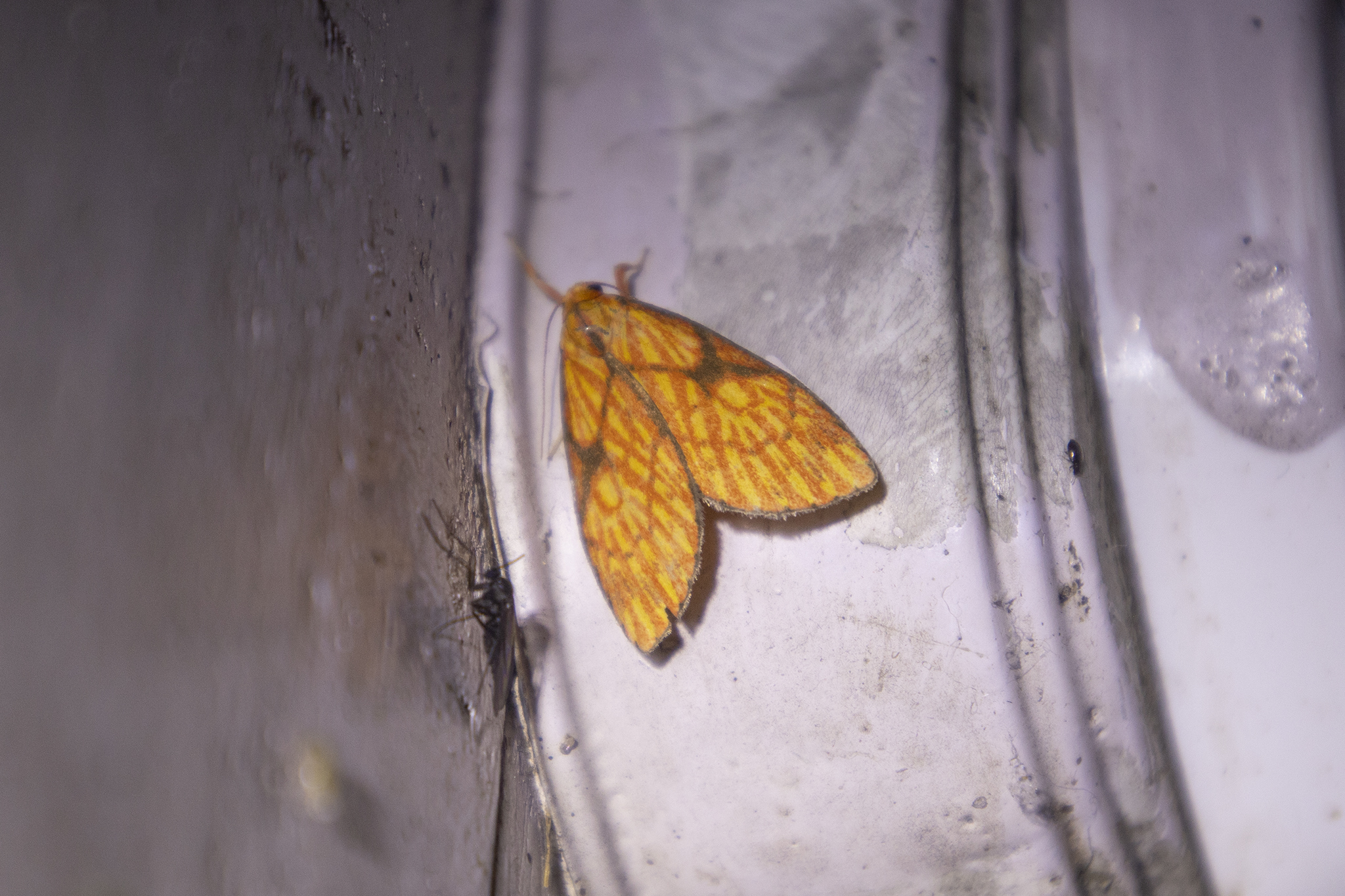
- Moorasura inflexa, India

Scientific classification
- Domain: Eukaryota
- Kingdom: Animalia
- Phylum: Arthropoda
- Class: Insecta
- Order: Lepidoptera
- Superfamily: Noctuoidea
- Family: Erebidae
- Subfamily: Arctiinae
- Tribe: Lithosiini
- Genus: Moorasura
- Species: M. inflexa

Binomial name
- Moorasura inflexa (Moore, 1878)

Synonyms
- Asura inflexa (Moore, 1878); Barsine inflexa (Moore, 1878); Miltochrista inflexa Moore, 1878

= Moorasura inflexa =

Species of moth

Moorasura inflexa is a species in the moth family Erebidae, found in the Himalayas in southern Asia.
