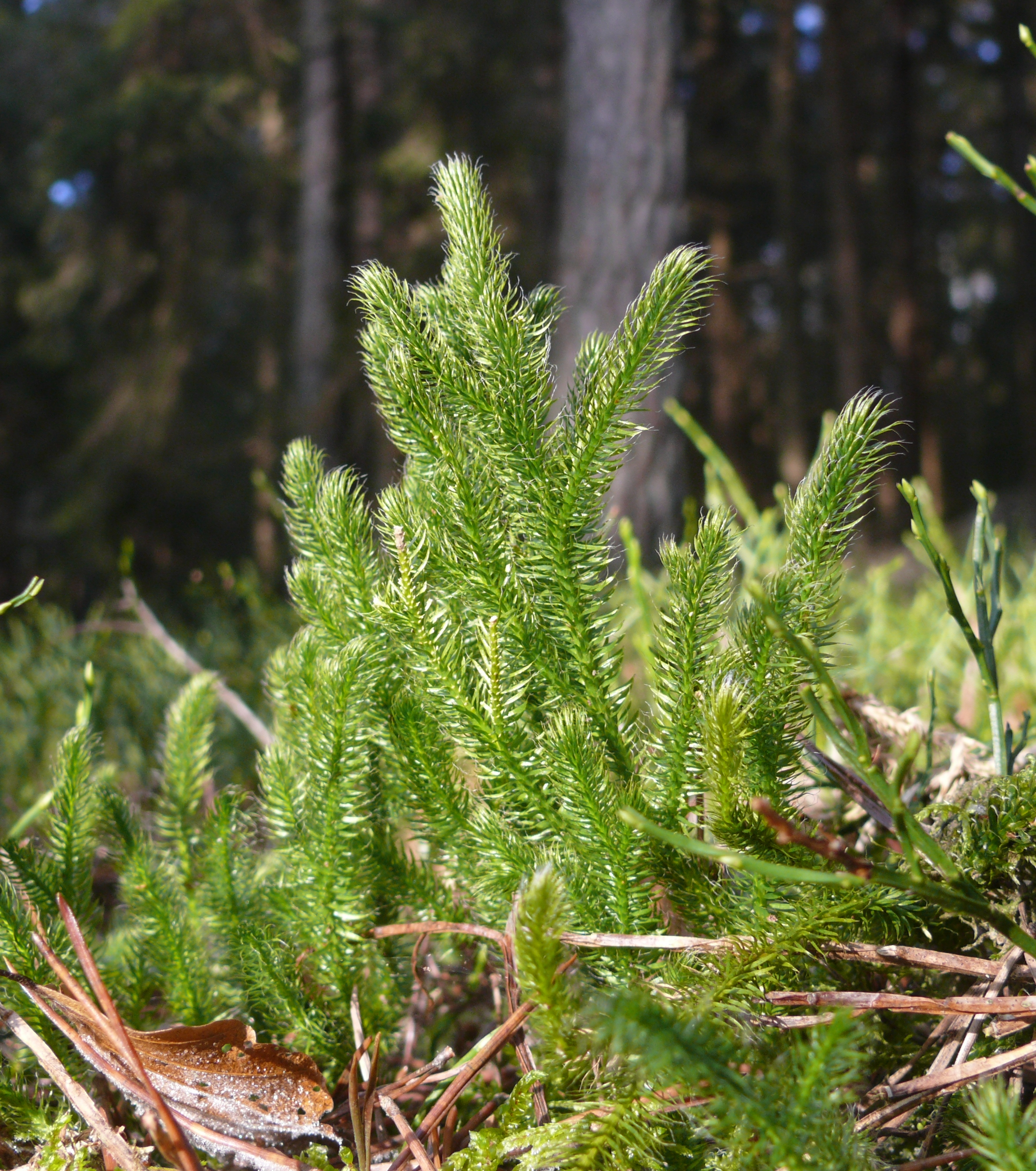
- Lycopodium clavatum

Scientific classification
- Kingdom: Plantae
- Clade: Embryophytes
- Clade: Tracheophytes
- Clade: Lycophytes
- Class: Lycopodiopsida
- Order: Lycopodiales
- Family: Lycopodiaceae
- Subfamily: Lycopodioideae
- Genus: Lycopodium; L.

Type species
- Lycopodium clavatum L.

Species
- See text

= Lycopodium =

Genus of spore-bearing plants

Lycopodium (from Ancient Greek lykos, 'wolf' and podion, diminutive of pous, 'foot') is a genus of clubmosses, also known as ground pines or creeping cedars, in the family Lycopodiaceae. Two very different circumscriptions of the genus are in use. In the Pteridophyte Phylogeny Group classification of 2016 (PPG I), Lycopodium is one of nine genera in the subfamily Lycopodioideae, and has from nine to 15 species. In other classifications, the genus is equivalent to the whole of the subfamily, since it includes all of the other genera. More than 40 species are accepted.

== Description ==
They are flowerless, vascular, terrestrial or epiphytic plants, with widely branched, erect, prostrate, or creeping stems, with small, simple, needle-like or scale-like leaves that cover the stem and branches thickly. The stems usually creep along the ground, forking at intervals. The leaves contain a single, unbranched vascular strand, and are microphylls by definition. They are usually arranged in spirals. The kidney-shaped (reniform) spore-cases (sporangia) contain spores of one kind only, (isosporous, homosporous), and are borne on the upper surface of the leaf blade of specialized leaves (sporophylls) arranged in a cone-like strobilus at the end of upright stems. Each sporangium contains numerous small spores. The club-shaped appearance of these fertile stems gives the clubmosses their common name.

Lycopods reproduce asexually by spores. The plants have an underground sexual phase that produces gametes, and this alternates in the lifecycle with the spore-producing plant. The prothallium developed from the spore is a subterranean mass of tissue of considerable size, and bears both the male and female organs (antheridia and archegonia). They are more commonly distributed vegetatively, though, through above- or below-ground rhizomes.

== Taxonomy ==
The genus Lycopodium was first published by Carl Linnaeus in 1753. He placed it in the Musci (mosses) along with genera such as Sphagnum, and included species such as Lycopodium selaginoides, now placed in the genus Selaginella in a different order from Lycopodium. Different sources use substantially different circumscriptions of the genus. Traditionally, Lycopodium was considered to be the only extant genus in the family Lycopodiaceae, so includes all the species in the family, although sometimes excluding one placed in the monotypic genus Phylloglossum. Other sources divide Lycopodiaceae species into three broadly defined genera, Lycopodium, Huperzia (including Phylloglossum) and Lycopodiella. In this approach, Lycopodium sensu lato has about 40 species. In the Pteridophyte Phylogeny Group classification of 2016 (PPG I), the broadly defined genus is equivalent to the subfamily Lycopodioideae, and Lycopodium is one of 16 genera in the family Lycopodiaceae, with between 9 and 15 species.

Varying circumscriptions of Lycopodium
Traditional	Christenhusz & Chase (2014)	PPG I
Lycopodium + Phylloglossum	Lycopodium s.l.	Lycopodium s.s. + 8 other genera making up subfamily Lycopodioideae
Lycopodium + Phylloglossum	Two other genera	7 genera (including Phylloglossum) in two subfamilies

=== Species ===
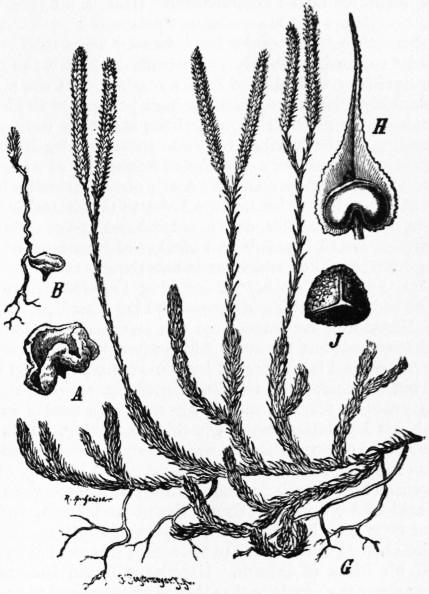
Lycopodium clavatum

Using the narrow circumscription of Lycopodium, in which it is one of nine genera in the subfamily Lycopodioideae, the Checklist of Ferns and Lycophytes of the World recognized the following species as of June 2024:

- Lycopodium clavatum L. – stag's-horn clubmoss; subcosmopolitan
- Lycopodium diaphanum (P.Beauv.) Sw. – Tristan da Cunha
- Lycopodium japonicum Thunb. – eastern Asia (Japan west and south to India and Sri Lanka)
- Lycopodium lagopus (Laest. ex C.Hartm.) Zinserl. ex Kuzen. – circumpolar arctic and subarctic
- Lycopodium papuanum Nessel – New Guinea
- Lycopodium venustulum Gaudich. – Hawaii, Western Samoa, the Society Islands
- Lycopodium vestitum Desv. ex Poir. – northwest South America (Andes)

== Uses ==
The spores of Lycopodium species are harvested and are sold as lycopodium powder.

Lycopodium sp. herb has been used in the traditional Austrian medicine internally as tea or externally as compresses for treatment of disorders of the locomotor system, skin, liver and bile, kidneys and urinary tract, infections, rheumatism, and gout, though claims of efficacy are unproven. It has also been used in some United States government chemical warfare test programs such as Operation Dew. Lycopodium powder was also used to determine the molecular size of oleic acid. Also known as a homeopathic remedy.
