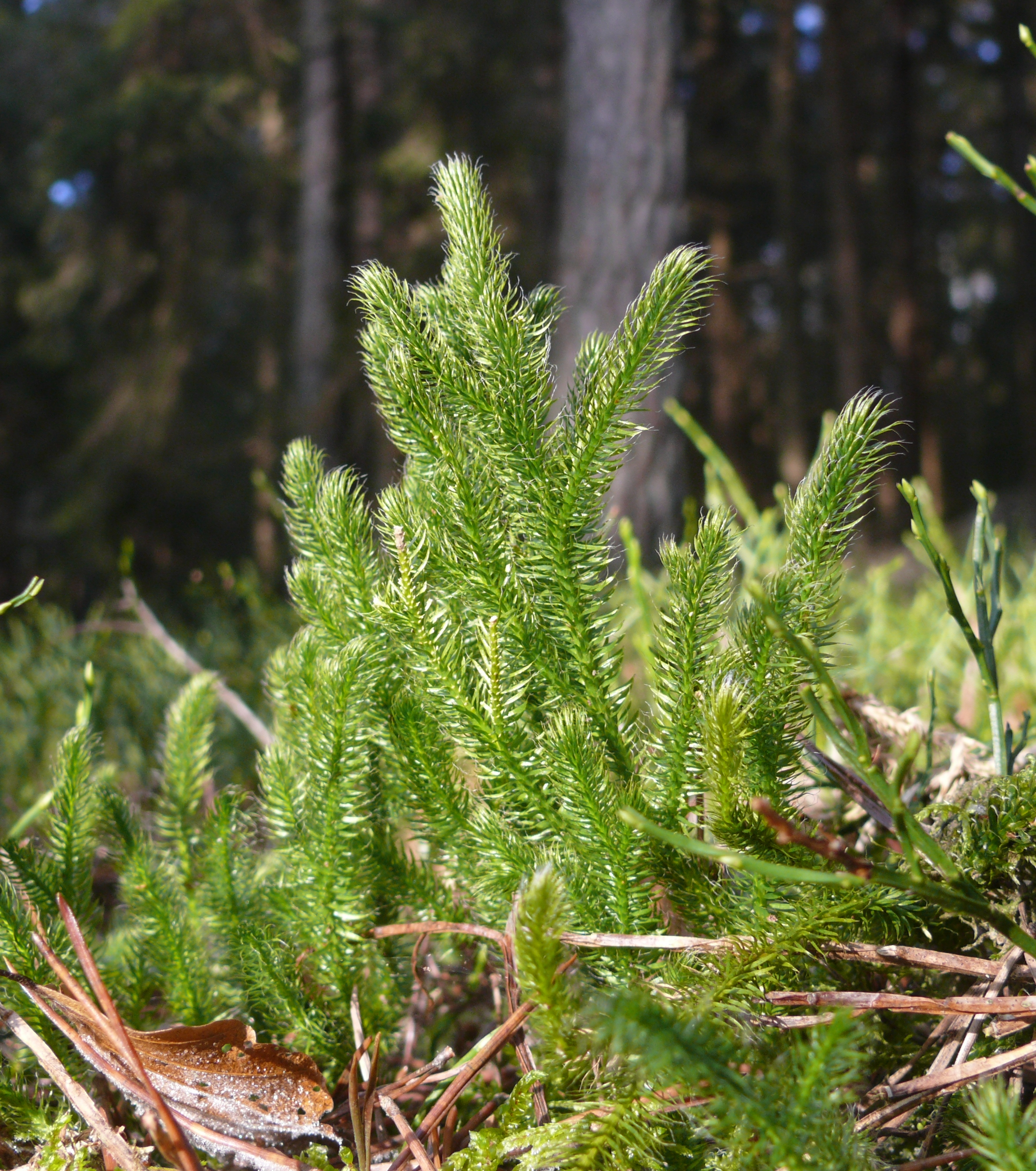

Conservation status
- Secure (NatureServe)

Scientific classification
- Kingdom: Plantae
- Clade: Tracheophytes
- Clade: Lycophytes
- Class: Lycopodiopsida
- Order: Lycopodiales
- Family: Lycopodiaceae
- Genus: Lycopodium
- Species: L. clavatum

Binomial name
- Lycopodium clavatum L.

Synonyms
- Synonymy: Lepidotis ciliata P. Beauv.; Lepidotis clavata (L.) P. Beauv.; Lepidotis inflexa P. Beauv.; Lycopodium aristatum Humb. & Bonpl. ex Willd.; Lycopodium ciliatum (P. Beauv.) Sw.; Lycopodium eriostachys Fée; Lycopodium inflexum (P. Beauv.) Sw.; Lycopodium piliferum Raddi; Lycopodium preslii Grev. & Hook.; Lycopodium trichiatum Bory; Lycopodium trichophyllum Desv.; Lycopodium contiguum Klotzsch; Copodium oxynemum Raf.; Lycopodium divaricatum Wall. ex Hook. & Grev.; Lycopodium kinabaluense Ching; Lycopodium serpens C. Presl 1825, not Desv. ex Poir. 1814; Lycopodium tamariscispica Cesati; Lycopodium torridum Gaudich.; Urostachys plutonis Herter; Lycopodium trichophyes Sprengel; Lycopodium mayoris Rosenstock

= Lycopodium clavatum =

Lycopodium clavatum Temporal range: 250–0 Ma Early Triassic (Induan) - Present

Species of spore-bearing plant

Lycopodium clavatum (common clubmoss, stag's-horn clubmoss, running clubmoss, or ground pine) is the most widespread species in the genus Lycopodium in the clubmoss family.

== Description ==
Lycopodium clavatum is a spore-bearing vascular plant, growing mainly prostrate along the ground with stems up to 1 m (39 in) long; the stems are much branched, and densely clothed with small, spirally arranged microphyll leaves. The leaves are 3–5 mm long and 0.7–1 mm broad, tapered to a fine hair-like white point. The branches bearing strobili or spore cones turn erect, reaching 5–15 cm (2.0–5.9 in) above ground, and their leaves are modified as sporophylls which enclose the spore capsules or sporangia. The spore cones are yellow-green, 2–3 cm (0.79–1.18 in) long, and 5 mm (0.20 in) broad. The horizontal stems produce dichotomous roots at frequent intervals along their length, allowing the stem to grow indefinitely along the ground. The stems superficially resemble small seedlings of coniferous trees, though it is not related to these at all.

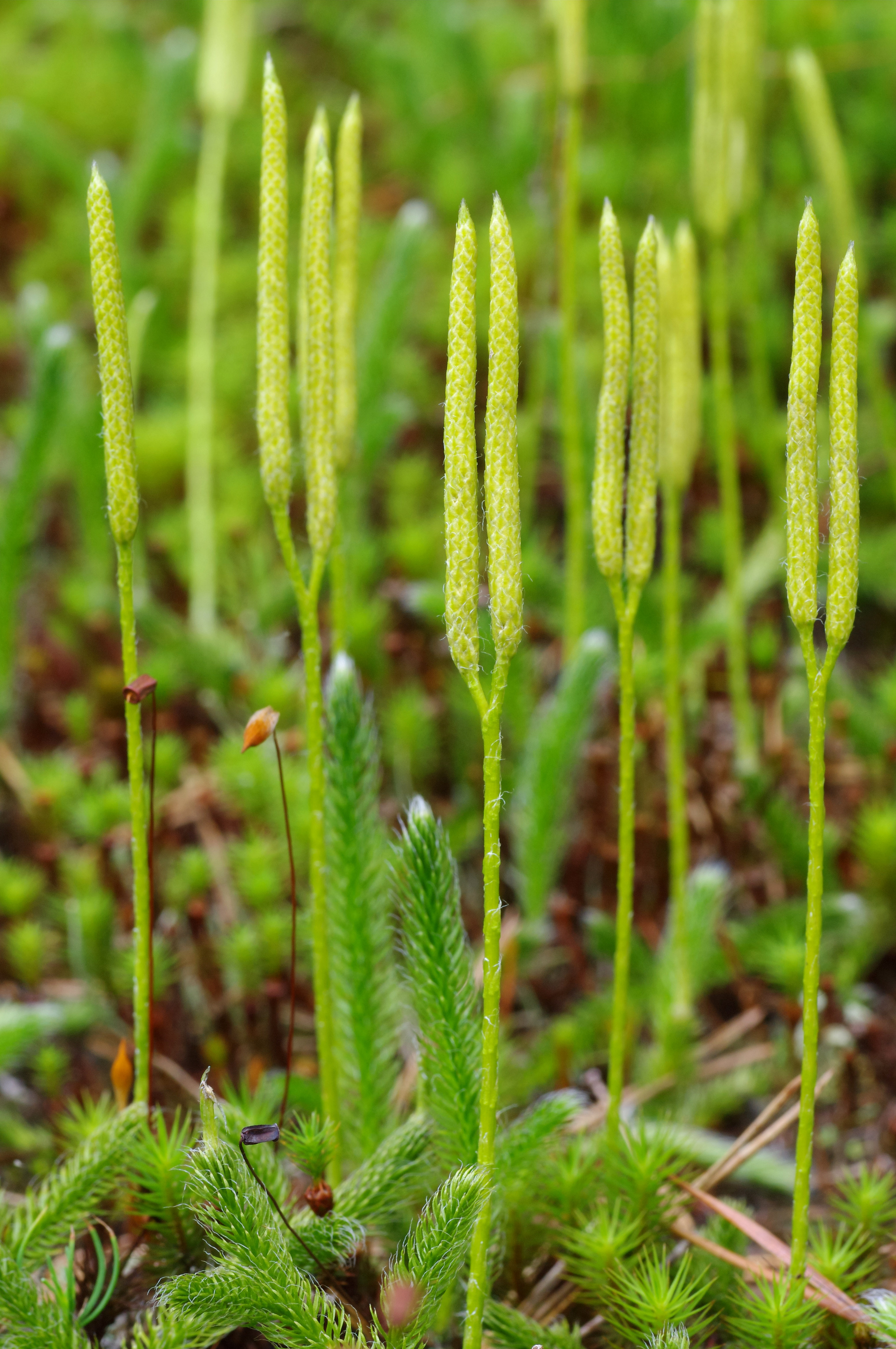
Close-up of strobili

== Distribution ==
Lycopodium clavatum has a widespread distribution across several continents. There are distinct subspecies and varieties in different parts of its range:

- Lycopodium clavatum subsp. clavatum
  - Lycopodium clavatum subsp. clavatum var. clavatum (Europe, Asia, North America)
  - Lycopodium clavatum subsp. clavatum var. aristatum (Mexico, Caribbean, Central America, northern South America south to northern Argentina)
  - Lycopodium clavatum subsp. clavatum var. asiaticum (Japan, northeast China)
  - Lycopodium clavatum subsp. clavatum var. borbonicum (central and southern Africa)
  - Lycopodium clavatum subsp. clavatum var. kiboanum (mountains of tropical Africa)
- Lycopodium clavatum subsp. contiguum (southern Central America, northern South America; syn. Lycopodium contiguum)

Although globally widespread, like many clubmosses, it is confined to undisturbed sites, disappearing from farmed areas and sites with regular burning. As a result, it is endangered in many areas. In the UK it is one of 101 species named as a high priority for conservation by the wild plant charity Plantlife.

Other common names

Common names for this species include wolf's-foot clubmoss, common clubmoss, wolf-paw clubmoss, running ground-pine, running pine, running moss, princess pine, and others.

== Use ==
The dried spores of this moss are explosive if present at high density in air. They were used as flash powder in early photography and are still used in magic acts. See lycopodium powder.

The plant has been used in Finnish traditional medicine as a diuretic and as a remedy for rickets.

Active constituents

Bioactive secondary metabolites in clubmosses include triterpenoids with acetylcholinesterase inhibitor activity isolated from this species.

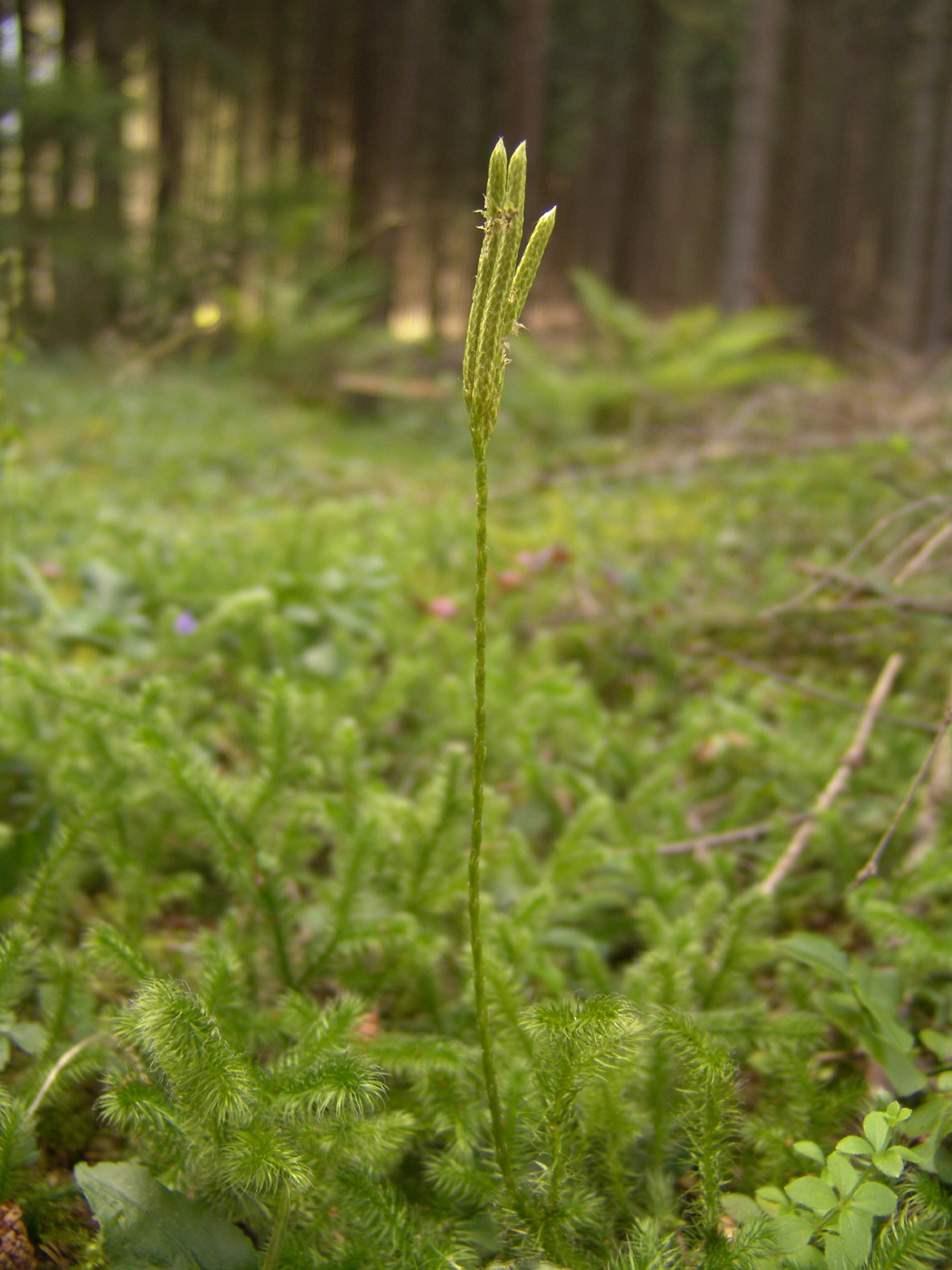
L. clavatum ssp. clavatum var. clavatum, with strobili

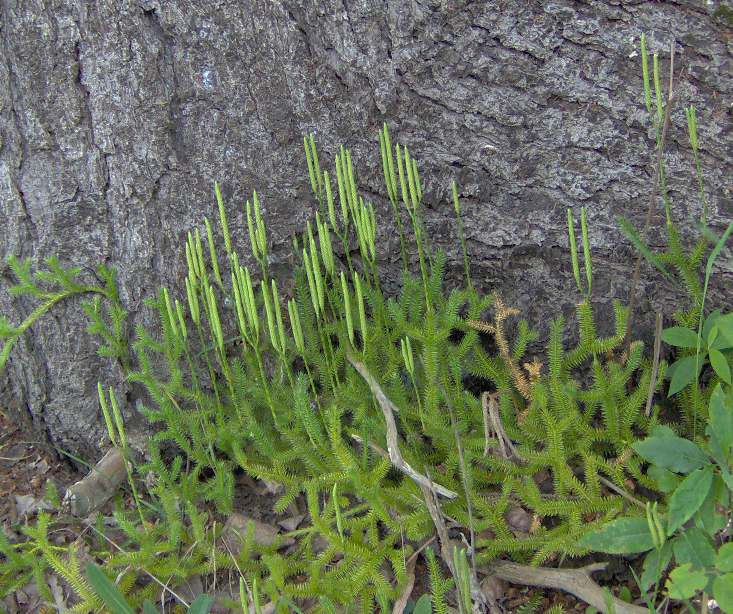
L. clavatum with strobili
