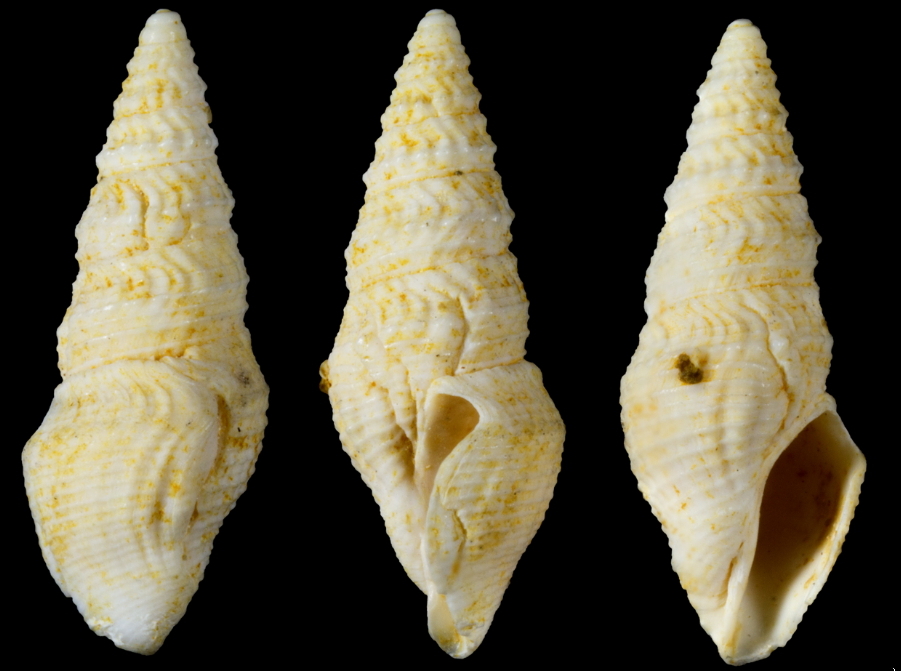
- Shell of † Crassispira inflexa (specimen at MNHN, Paris)

Scientific classification
- Kingdom: Animalia
- Phylum: Mollusca
- Class: Gastropoda
- Subclass: Caenogastropoda
- Order: Neogastropoda
- Superfamily: Conoidea
- Family: Pseudomelatomidae
- Genus: Crassispira
- Species: C. inflexa

Binomial name
- Crassispira inflexa (Lamarck, 1804)

Synonyms
- † Crassispira (Tripia) inflexa (Lamarck, 1804); † Drillia (Tripia) angulosa (Deshayes, 1834)

= Crassispira inflexa =

Extinct species of gastropod

Crassispira inflexa is an extinct species of sea snail, a marine gastropod mollusk in the family Pseudomelatomidae, the turrids and allies.

== Distribution ==
Fossils have been found in Eocene strata in the Ile-de-France, France.
