= Hyperaspis inflexa =

Scientific classification
- Kingdom: Animalia
- Phylum: Arthropoda
- Clade: Pancrustacea
- Class: Insecta
- Order: Coleoptera
- Suborder: Polyphaga
- Infraorder: Cucujiformia
- Family: Coccinellidae
- Genus: Hyperaspis
- Species: H. inflexa

Binomial name
- Hyperaspis inflexa Casey, 1899

Synonyms
- Hyperaspis serena Casey, 1908

Species of beetle

Hyperaspis inflexa, known generally as the curved lady beetle or curved ladybug, is a species of lady beetle in the family Coccinellidae. It is found in North America, where it has been recorded from Alberta, British Columbia, Arizona, California, Colorado, Idaho, Illinois, Massachusetts, New Jersey, New Mexico, North Carolina, North Dakota, Oklahoma, Pennsylvania, Tennessee, Texas and Washington.

== Description ==
Adults reach a length of about 1.80-2.85 mm. The lateral area and anterior border of the pronotum of the males is yellow. The colour pattern of the elytron is variable, but most common pattern is black with a lateral vitta.
