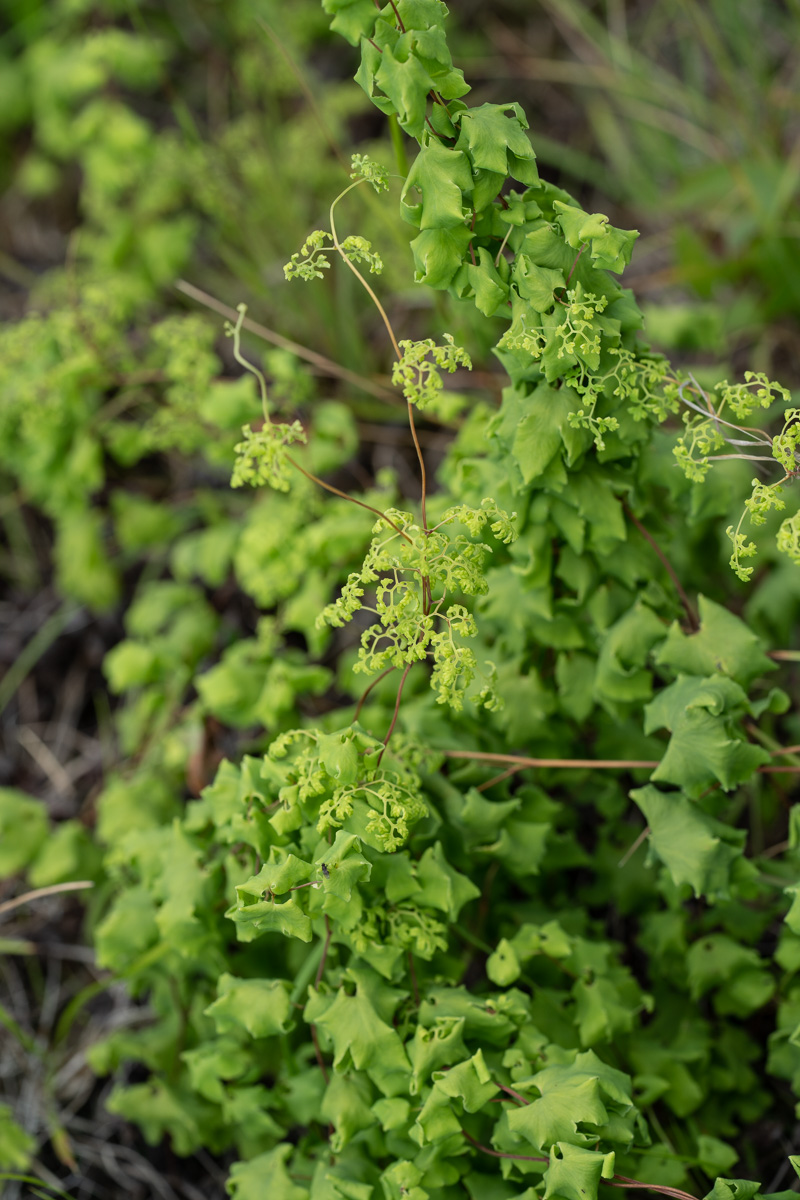

Conservation status
- Apparently Secure (NatureServe)

Scientific classification
- Kingdom: Plantae
- Clade: Tracheophytes
- Division: Polypodiophyta
- Class: Polypodiopsida
- Order: Schizaeales
- Family: Lygodiaceae
- Genus: Lygodium
- Species: L. palmatum

Binomial name
- Lygodium palmatum (Bernh.) Swartz

= Lygodium palmatum =

American climbing fern

Species of fern

Lygodium palmatum is the only species of its genus native to North America. Unlike most species in the genus, this one, called the American climbing fern, Hartford fern (after Hartford, Connecticut), or Alice's fern, is extremely hardy in temperate zones (other species tolerant of temperate climates include New Zealand's Lygodium articulatum and the Japanese Lygodium japonicum, which is now highly invasive in Florida).The name "Hartford Fern" being derived from its former prevalence in Hartford and the surrounding Connecticut area. It was extensively used as a Christmas decoration by early settlers, leading to the first law protecting a plant species in the United States in 1869.

This fern is on endangered or threatened species lists in several states. It requires constant moisture, high light levels, and intensely acid soil to thrive. Where these conditions are present, it grows in abundance. This leads to a pattern of abundant, but rare and localized populations throughout its range. Its range is essentially Appalachian, ranging from New England down through the Appalachians, Piedmont and Appalachian plateaus into the American south.

Like other rare Lygodium species (such as Lygodium articulatum), their spores have a relatively meager viability, with even immediately sown spores having less than a 50% germination rate, and spores sown after 6 months of storage having less than 5%.

== Taxonomy ==
Lygodium palmatum is generally accepted to be part of a clade of basally divergent members of the Lygodium genus.Some modern systematists have placed it as the sole member of a basally divergent subgenus Palmata, while others have placed it in a clade with Lygodium articulatum.The divergence of these results is likely due to the differential out group selection of the two studies. This divergence is evidenced both by molecular phylogenetics, and by various morphological discrepancies between Lygodium palmatum and the remainder of the genus. Most notably, their spores are substantially smoother than any other species in the genus, and they possess dichotomously branched pinnae, and high levels of frond dimorphism.

Interestingly, even within the limited present range of the species, there are regional differences that some argue may constitute subspecies. Of particular note is the divergence in the character of hairs on the abaxial surface of pinnae - they are largely glabrous in specimens found Northeast of Maryland, and are pubescent in those Southwest of Maryland, and in isolated populations found in Ohio and Michigan.

Lygodium palmatum has a basal chromosome count of n=30, as is common among the genus, with the other common ploidy levels being n=28 and 29.
