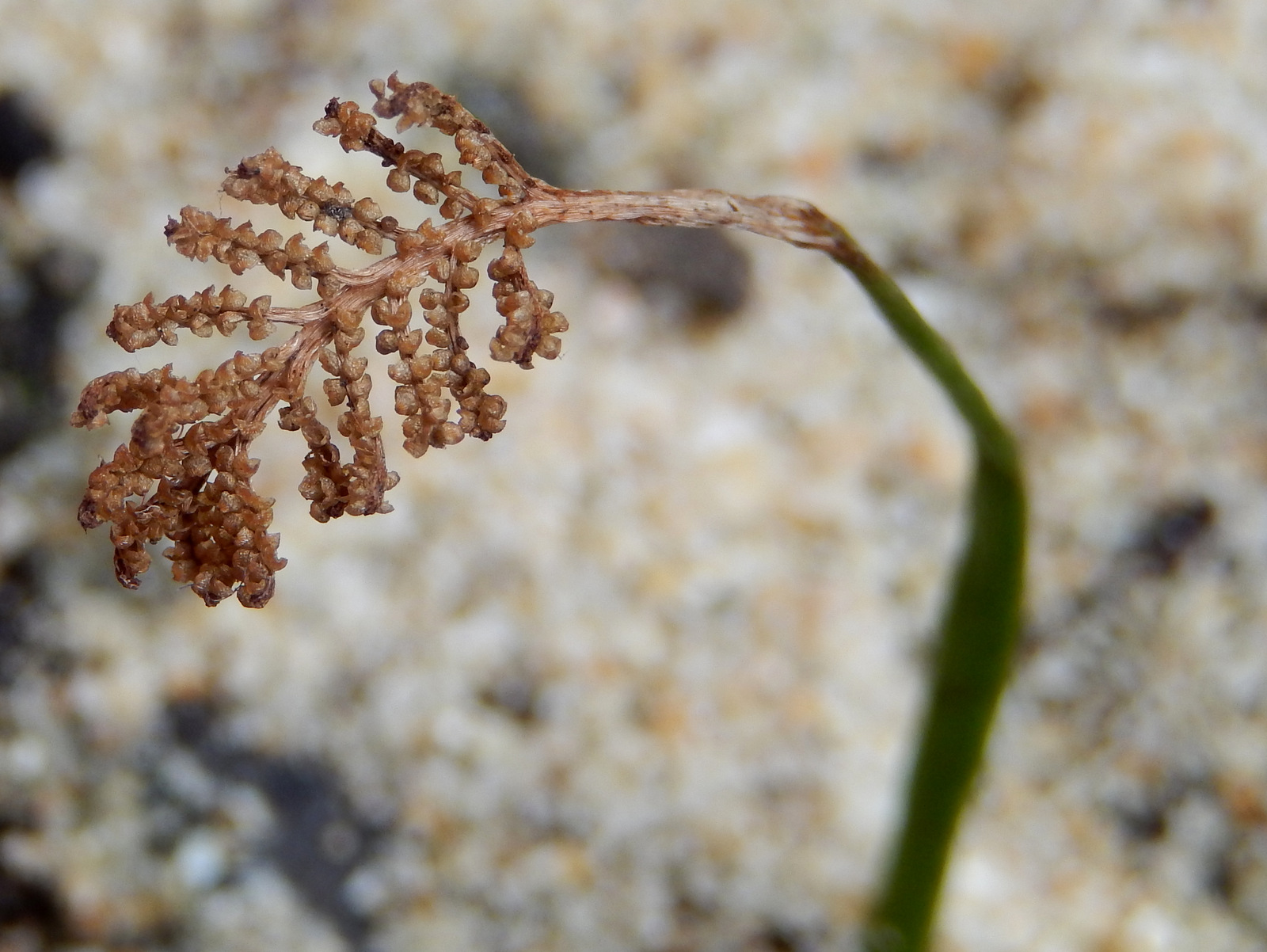
- fertile frond at Springwood, New South Wales, Australia
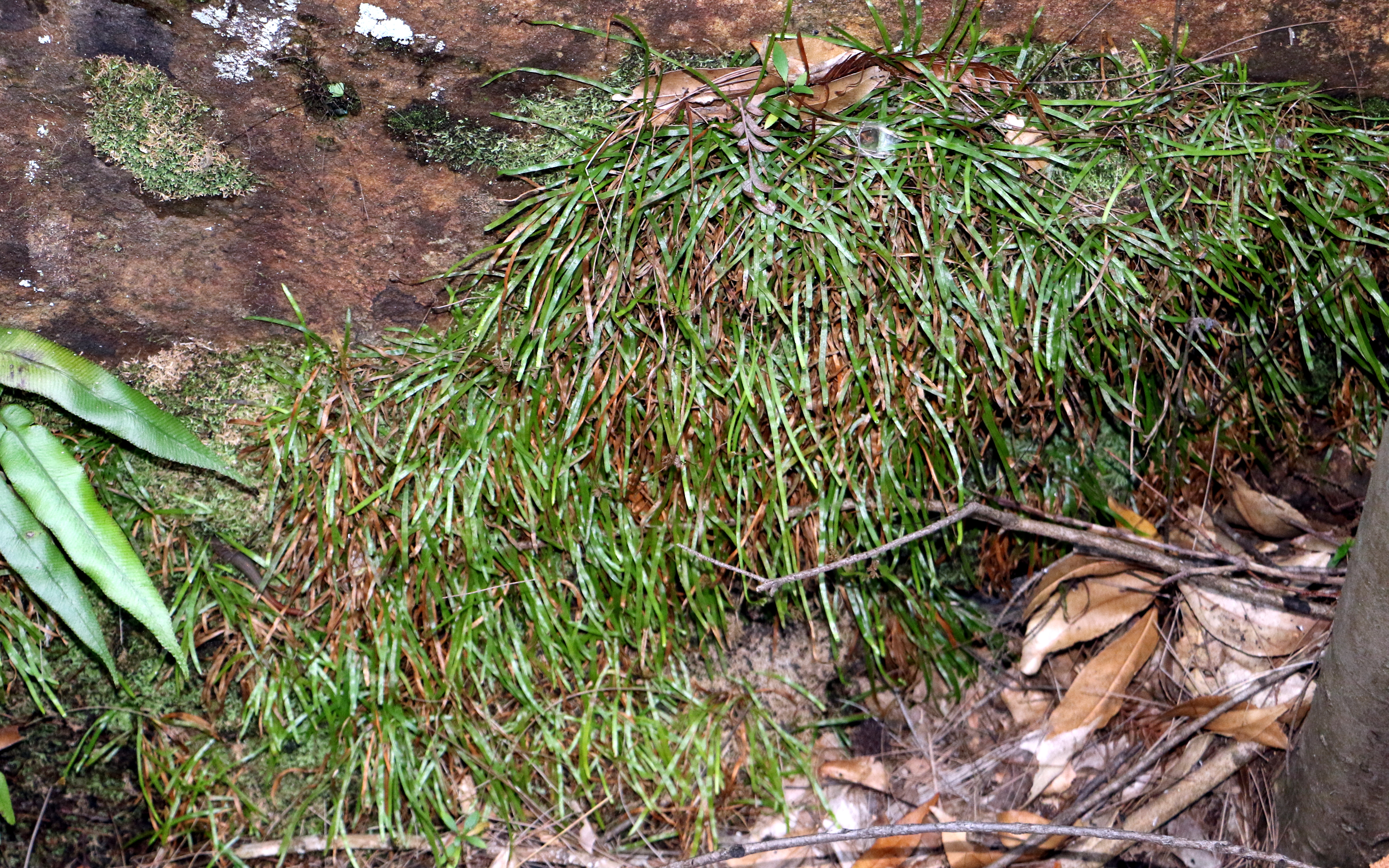
- colony of ferns at Garigal National Park

Scientific classification
- Kingdom: Plantae
- Clade: Tracheophytes
- Division: Polypodiophyta
- Class: Polypodiopsida
- Order: Schizaeales
- Family: Schizaeaceae
- Genus: Schizaea
- Species: S. rupestris

Binomial name
- Schizaea rupestris R.Br.

= Schizaea rupestris =

Species of fern

Schizaea rupestris is a small Australian fern. Most populations are in found in the ranges near Sydney. However, it also occurs near Woolgoolga and Western Australia.

The fern is a mat-shaped plant from which arise slender upright fronds composed of a single unbranched blade. Infertile fronds are 5–12 cm high and 1–2.5 mm wide, while the rarer fertile fronds are 8–20 cm high. Thinner than the infertile fronds, the fertile fronds are topped with a tiny combed reproductive growth. These are 3 to 16 mm long.

Schizaea rupestris is found between Walpole and Torbay Hill in Western Australia, between latitudes 33° and 36°S in the Great Dividing Range in New South Wales. A small grass-like plant, it often occurs in moist areas such as near waterfalls, or shaded areas of sandstone shelves or caves.

The generic name Schizaea is from the Greek, meaning "to cleave or split", rupestris means near rocks. It first appeared in scientific literature in the year 1810, in the Prodromus Florae Novae Hollandiae et Insulae Van Diemen, published by the prolific Scottish botanist, Robert Brown.
