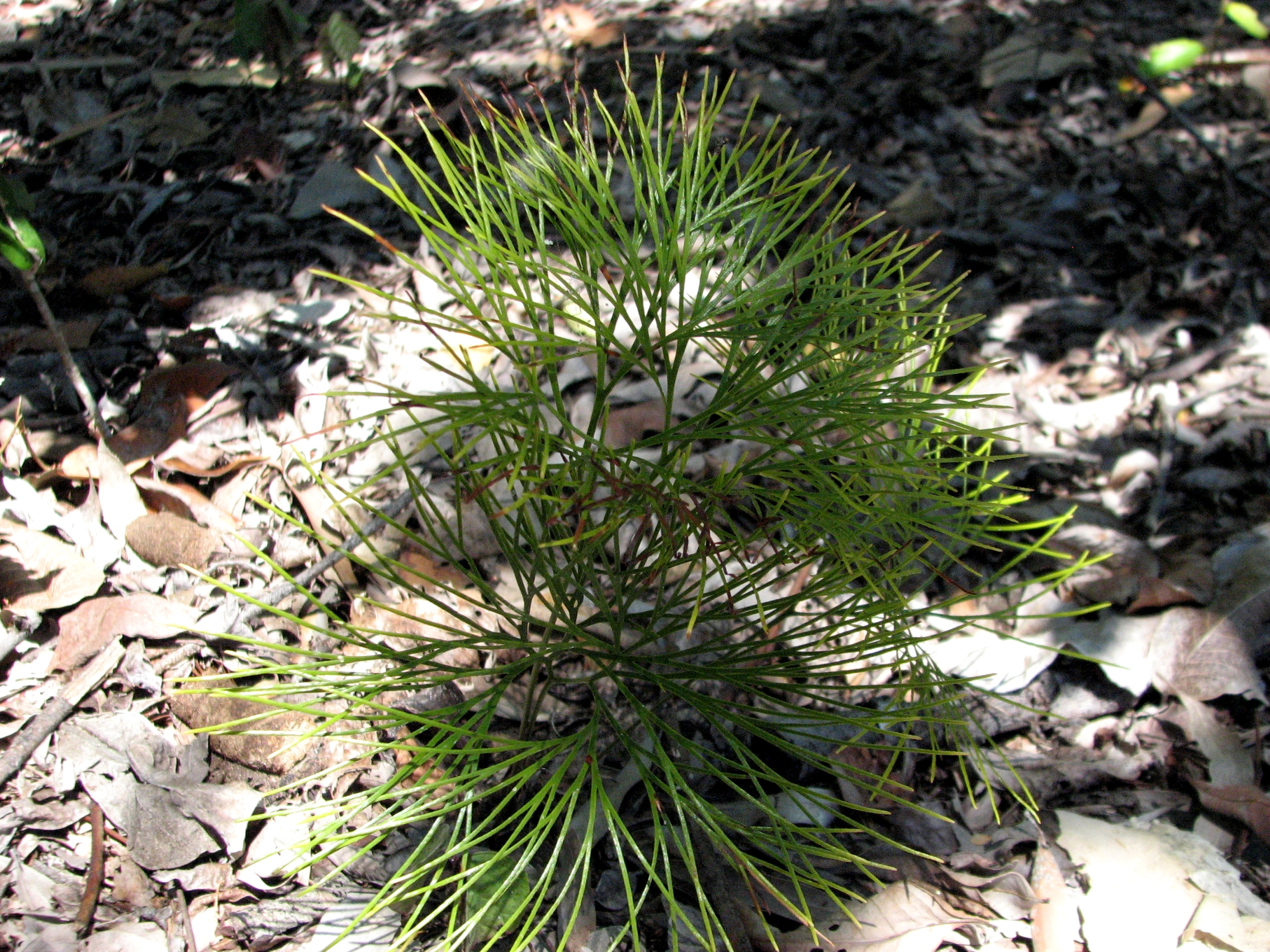

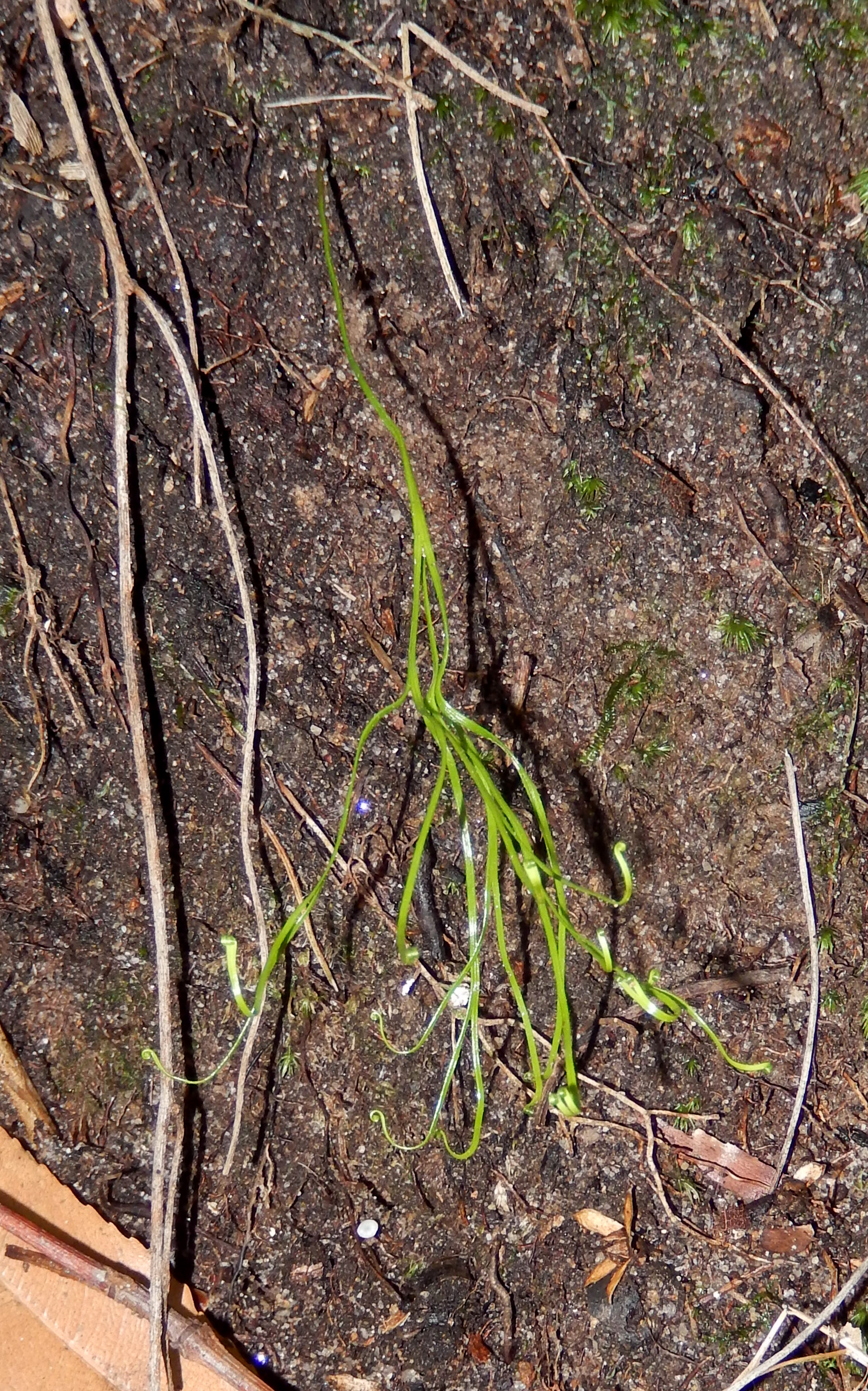

Scientific classification
- Kingdom: Plantae
- Clade: Tracheophytes
- Division: Polypodiophyta
- Class: Polypodiopsida
- Order: Schizaeales
- Family: Schizaeaceae
- Genus: Schizaea
- Species: S. dichotoma

Binomial name
- Schizaea dichotoma (L.) Sm.

Synonyms
- Acrostichum dichotomum L.

= Schizaea dichotoma =

branched comb fern

Species of fern

Schizaea dichotoma, the branched comb fern, in the family Schizaeaceae, is a small plant usually found in open forest or heath, often on sandy soils. The habit is mostly upright, with up to 20 segments, twice or more times branched, or dichotomous. It is native to southern and southeast Asia from India eastwards, and to Australia, New Zealand, Papua New Guinea, Malesia and islands in the Pacific Ocean. It is a low-growing plant, 20 to 40 cm tall. The specific epithet dichotoma is derived from Greek, meaning "twice cut", referring to the branched nature of the fronds. This plant first appeared in scientific literature in the year 1753 as Acrostichum dichotomum, published in the Species Plantarum by Carl Linnaeus. Unusual for a fern, it is said to be a saprophyte facilitated by a fungal symbiote.
