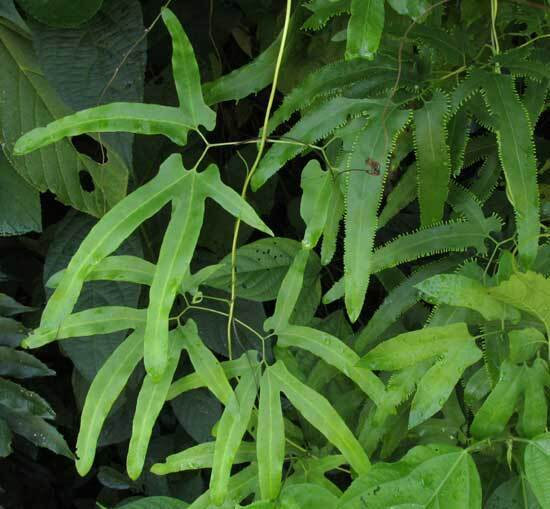
- Pinnae, with fertile ones on the right

Scientific classification
- Kingdom: Plantae
- Clade: Tracheophytes
- Division: Polypodiophyta
- Class: Polypodiopsida
- Order: Schizaeales
- Family: Lygodiaceae
- Genus: Lygodium
- Species: L. heterodoxum

Binomial name
- Lygodium heterodoxum Kunze

Synonyms
- Hydroglossum heterodoxum (Kunze) T.Moore; Lygodictyon heterodoxum (Kunze) J.Sm.; Hydroglossum mexicanum Fée; Hydroglossum spectabile Liebm.

= Lygodium heterodoxum =

Species of plant

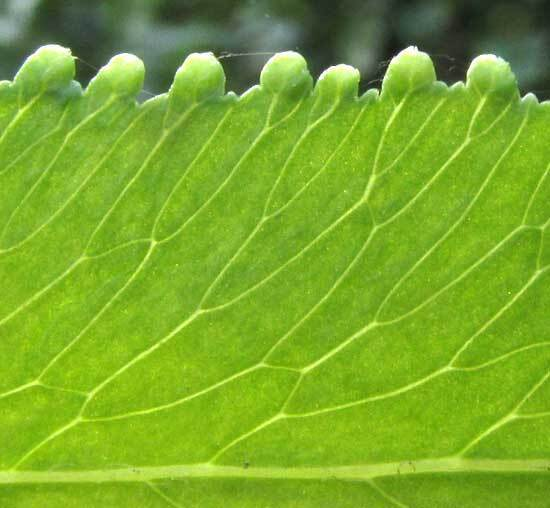
Spore-producing lobes beginning to form at fertile pinnule's margin, and forking, interconnecting veins

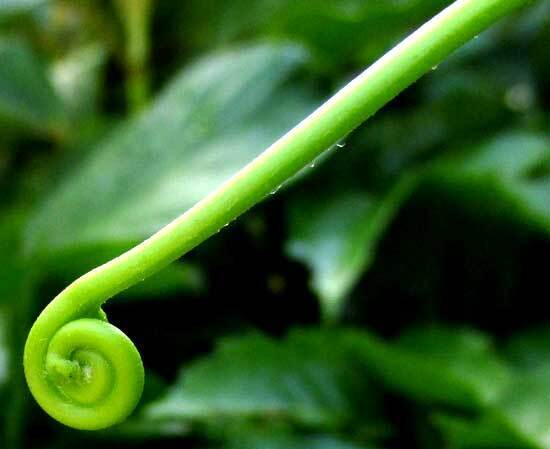
Unwinding leaf tip, the crozier

Lygodium heterodoxum, with no widely used common name other than climbing fern, which is applicable to all species of the genus Lygodium, is a fern native to tropical parts the Americas.

== Description ==
With Lygodium heterodoxum and other Lygodium species, what appears to be a twining stem with several compound leaves, or fronds, actually is just one big leaf, with the apparent stem being the leaf's twining rachis. The actual stem is a rhizome growing below ground or at the ground's surface. Keeping this unusual growth pattern in mind, here are other key features of Lygodium heterodoxum:

- The rhizome is short-creeping with brown hairs.
- The leaf's rachis is straw-colored and hairless. Its first divisions off the rachis consist of pinnae divided into divergent subdivisions, or "pinnules," each of which is more or less dichotomously forked or nearly completely divided twice- (to three- or more-times), forming four to several 3-cut or narrowly oblong lobes. Lobes are up to 20 cm (7 3/4 in) long and 2 cm (3/4 in) wide, hairless, with margins without teeth or indentations, and blades with branching veins connecting once or twice with one another after issuing from the midvein.
- On the margins of fertile pinnules, spores are produced on finger-like lobes about 1 mm (1/16 in) wide each bearing two rows of sporangia, with each sporangium covered with a yellow, hairless, pocket-like covering serving as an "indusium."

== Distribution ==
Lygodium heterodoxum occurs in southern Mexico's states of Veracruz, Puebla, Tabasco, Oaxaca and Chiapas. In Central America it occurs throughout, except in El Salvador.

== Habitat ==
In Mexico's Veracruz state, Lygodium heterodoxum occurs in tropical forests with deciduous, semi-deciduous and evergreen leaves. In Nicaragua, Lygodium heterodoxum occurs in cloud forests and forests with plenty of rain at elevations of from 15–1,150 m (49–3,773 ft). In Belize, it inhabits tropical primary forest.

== Ecology ==
Coinciding with the species' preference for wet environments, a study found that over 99% of the spores of Lygodium heterodoxum stored in dark, dry conditions for one year failed to germinate, while 40% of the spores stored in dark, water-imbibed conditions did germinate.

== In traditional medicine ==
In Guatemala, Lygodium heterodoxum, as well as Lygodium venustum, have been used to treat epilepsy. In Nicaragua the leaf is used both internally and externally to treat snakebite.

== Taxonomy ==
In 1849 when Gustav Kunze formally described and named Lygodium heterodoxum, his type specimen was a dried collection by Henri Guillaume Galeotti, who collected plants in Mexico from 1835 to 1840.

=== Phylogeny ===
Molecular phylogenetic analysis supports the assumption that Lygodium heterodoxum is an allopolyploid, possibly deriving from a cross between Lygodium merrillii and the ancestor of Lygodium circinatum and Lygodium conforme.

=== Etymology ===
The genus name Lygodium is from the Greek lygodes, meaning "flexible." This refers to the twining rachis of Lygodium species.

The species name heterodoxum is based on the Greek heterodoxos, meaning "of another or different opinion." The name was chosen because Kunze regarded the species unusual among most of the Lygodium species he knew, mainly because of how veins in its pinnules interconnected.
