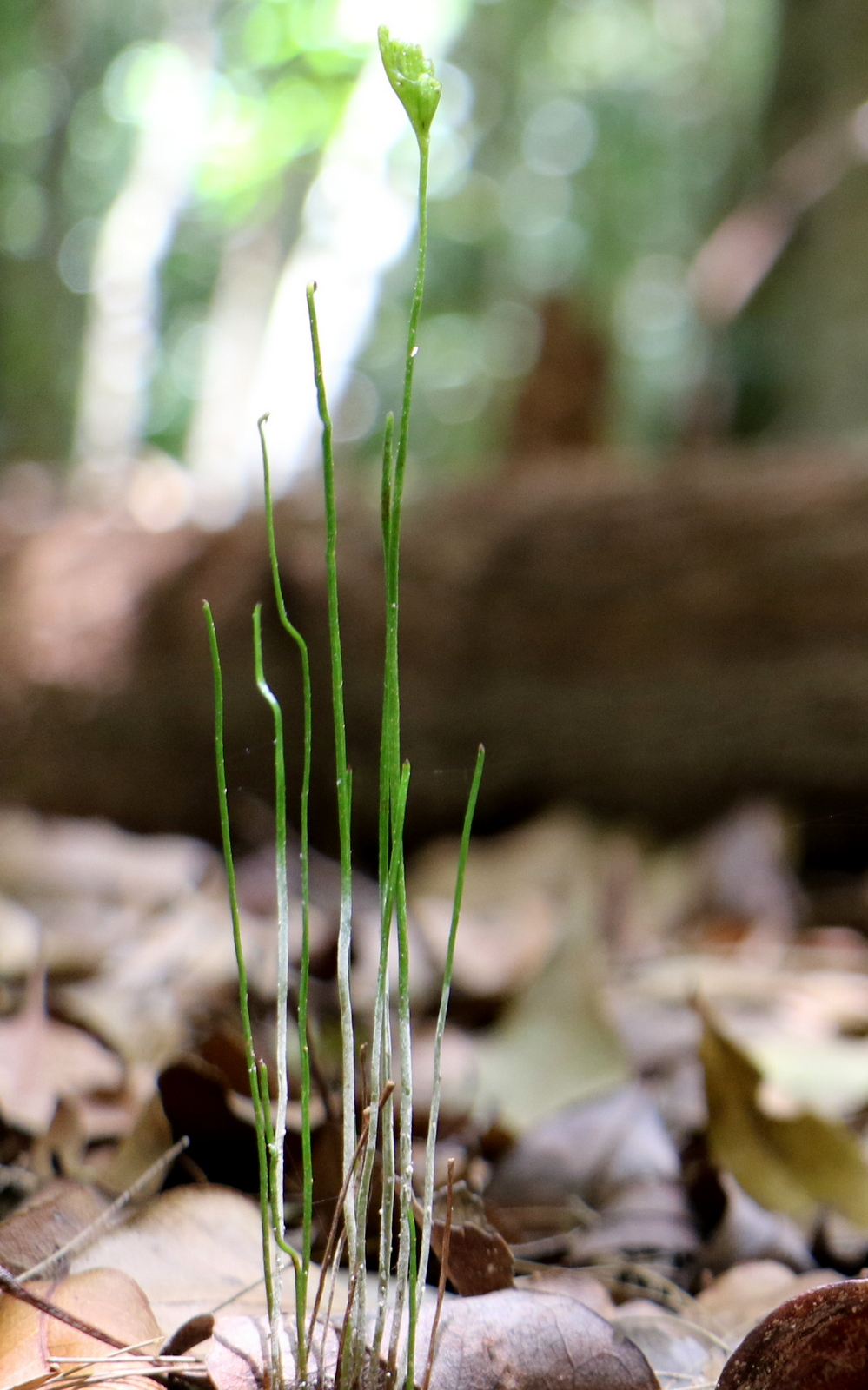

Scientific classification
- Kingdom: Plantae
- Clade: Tracheophytes
- Division: Polypodiophyta
- Class: Polypodiopsida
- Order: Schizaeales
- Family: Schizaeaceae
- Genus: Schizaea
- Species: S. fistulosa

Binomial name
- Schizaea fistulosa Labill.

= Schizaea fistulosa =

Narrow comb fern

Species of plant

Schizaea fistulosa, the narrow comb fern is a small plant found in a variety of habitats. Widespread but a fairly uncommon fern found in southern Australia. Also seen in other countries such as New Zealand, Chile and New Caledonia. A low plant, 4 to 30 cm tall in moist situations. The specific epithet fistulosa means "tube shaped".

This plant first appeared in scientific literature in the year 1807, published in the Novae Hollandiae Plantarum Specimen. Described from a Tasmanian plant by the French botanist, Jacques Labillardière.
