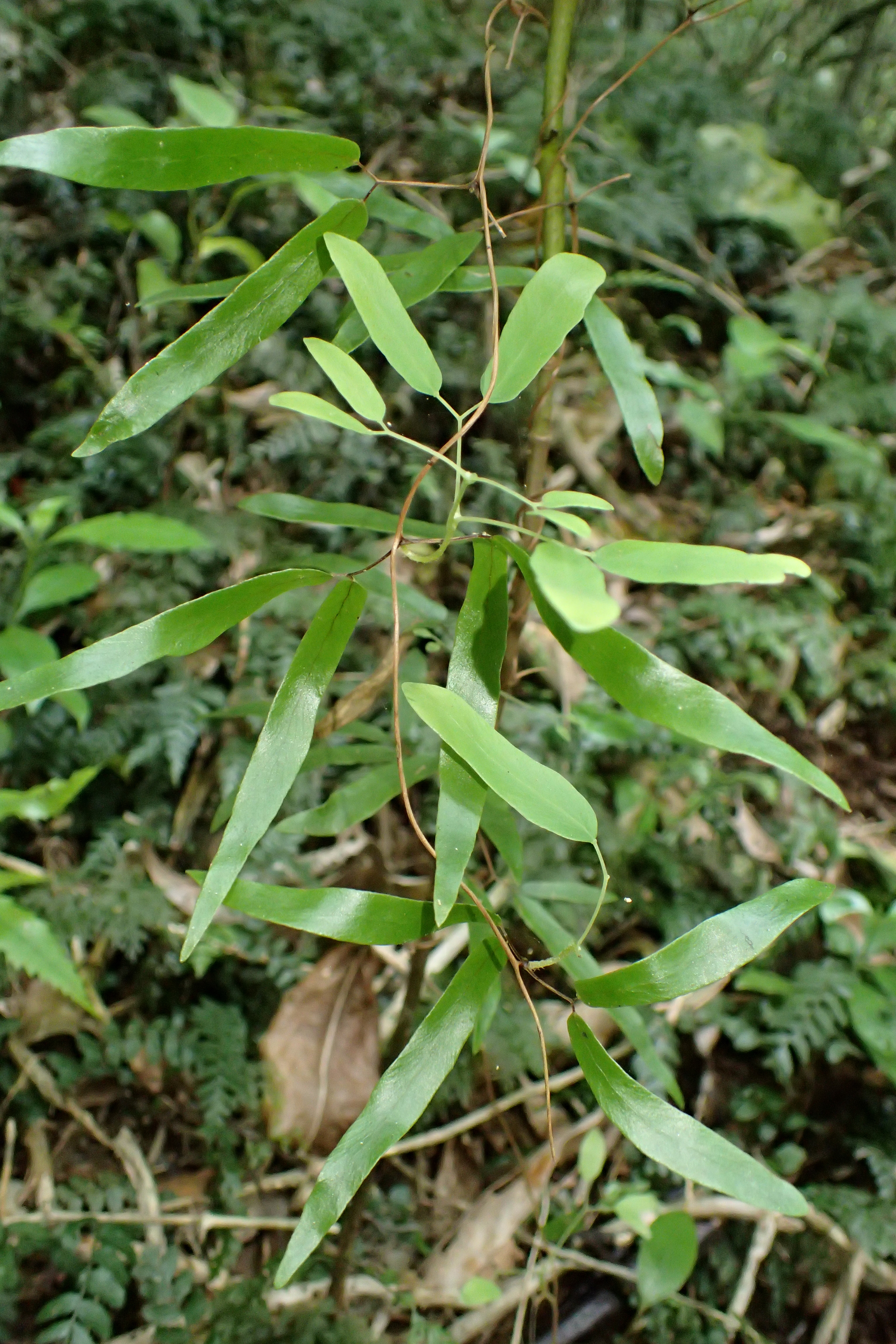

Scientific classification
- Kingdom: Plantae
- Clade: Tracheophytes
- Division: Polypodiophyta
- Class: Polypodiopsida
- Order: Schizaeales
- Family: Lygodiaceae
- Genus: Lygodium
- Species: L. articulatum

Binomial name
- Lygodium articulatum A.Rich.

Synonyms
- Lygodium gracilescens Colenso

= Lygodium articulatum =

Species of fern

Lygodium articulatum, commonly referred to as mangemange or Bushman's mattress, is a climbing fern endemic to the North Island forests of New Zealand. Mangemange is unique compared to other ferns in the area due to the vine-like curtain it creates in the canopy. The plant is a traditional Māori building material used to fasten structures and construct hīnaki (eel traps), and received its English language name due to early European settlers observing Māori forming makeshift beds in the bush from the plant.

== Description ==
Lygodium articulatum roots extend laterally from the stem (rhizome) of the plant. The rhizomes of mangemange are hairy and long-creeping, giving rise to widely spaced fronds. Fronds grow alternately from the stem and form dichotomous costae that twist and climb until they find nearby branches or trees. Once the plant has the support of a branch, stipes and pinnae form. Mangemange will form either sterile vegetative pinnae (10 cm (3.9 in)) or fertile pinnae (1 cm (0.39 in)). Sterile pinnae are flat and smooth, while fertile pinnae are wrinkled and fan shaped, terminating in spore structures that release a yellow spore-dust when ripe.

Lygodium articulatum will often grow rapidly 3 metres (9.8 ft) high in a tree, where it may become a wall or curtain of leaves and twiggy vines. It is often difficult to navigate through due to the strength of the rhizomes. This behaviour is common to its genus Lygodium, and has led to several members of the genus' widespread success. A common example is the behavior of Lygodium japonicum, which similarly forms dense vertical mats, that are currently highly invasive and damagin in Northern Florida.

== Taxonomy ==
The species was described by Achille Richard in 1832, based on specimens collected by Jules Dumont d'Urville during the 1827 voyage of the Astrolabe to New Zealand. It is the only member of the genus found in New Zealand.

Lygodium articulatum is considered by modern systematists to be a member of a basally divergent clade within the Lygodium genus. While pre-modern phylogenetic studies that relied on morphology had considered it to be a highly derived member of the genus, modern molecular phylogenetic studies have found it to be a member of a basally divergent clade alongside its temperate North American sister, Lygodium palmatum.

In 2013, the taxon Lygodium gracilescens, described by William Colenso in 1896, was synonymised with Lygodium articulatum.

== Etymology ==
The Māori language name mangemange has an uncertain etymology, though it may be related to the Tongan word maamange, a name used to describe yams. Other names in Māori include tarikupenga (snare net) and makamaka. Early European settlers names for the plant included bushman's mattress and bushman's bunk, referring to the use of the plant in bushcraft for makeshift beds. The species epithet articulatum means "joined", and a reference to the stems of the plant.

== Ecology ==
Mangemange is unique compared to other ferns in the area due to the vine–like curtain it creates in the canopy. Although the majority of the plant is found in the canopy of the surrounding forest, the roots and stem of mangemange form on the ground, meaning it cannot be classified as an epiphyte. trampers strung up by plant. British soldiers

== Distribution and habitat ==
Mangemange is mainly found on the North Island of New Zealand, specifically in the Northland, Auckland, Volcanic Plateau, Gisborne and Taranaki regions. It grows from sea level to 950 metres (3,120 ft) in elevation.

Since it is a climbing fern that uses neighboring structures to grow, its habitat is mainly based on the distribution of other species such as the manuka and kanuka scrub, and in kauri, podocarp and broadleaved forest.

== Māori cultural uses ==
In Māori culture, mangemange is a material used to bind constructions, such as whare, and to construct items such as hīnaki (eel traps), due to the durability of the stems. It was also used in traditional burial customs, to fasten bodies to trees before internment. The plant is often a feature of traditional stories, as a material used to trap taniwha.

Mangemange has uses in traditional rongoā medicinal practices, where infusions of fronds are used as a toothache remedy. The leaves when dried could also be used to fasten a diaper, and the plant could be used to form a makeshift bed in the bush. The stems have uses in Māori stone crafting, as they are strong enough to be able to saw through pounamu.

== Early European culture ==
The plant had a poor reputation among British soldiers during the New Zealand Wars, due to the impenetrable nature of the plant's stems.

== Gallery ==
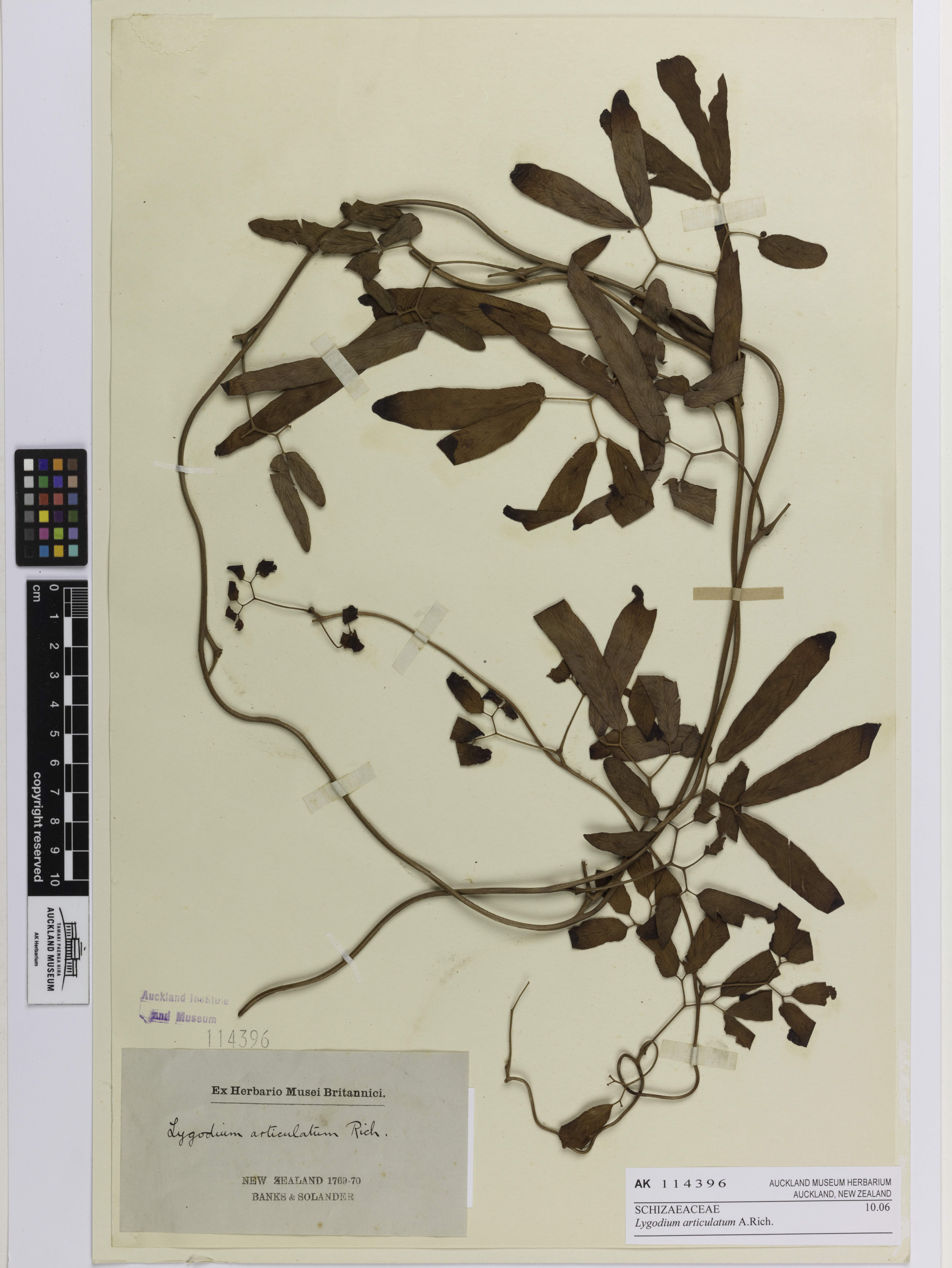
Type specimen collected from Whitianga in November 1769 by Joseph Banks and Daniel Solander

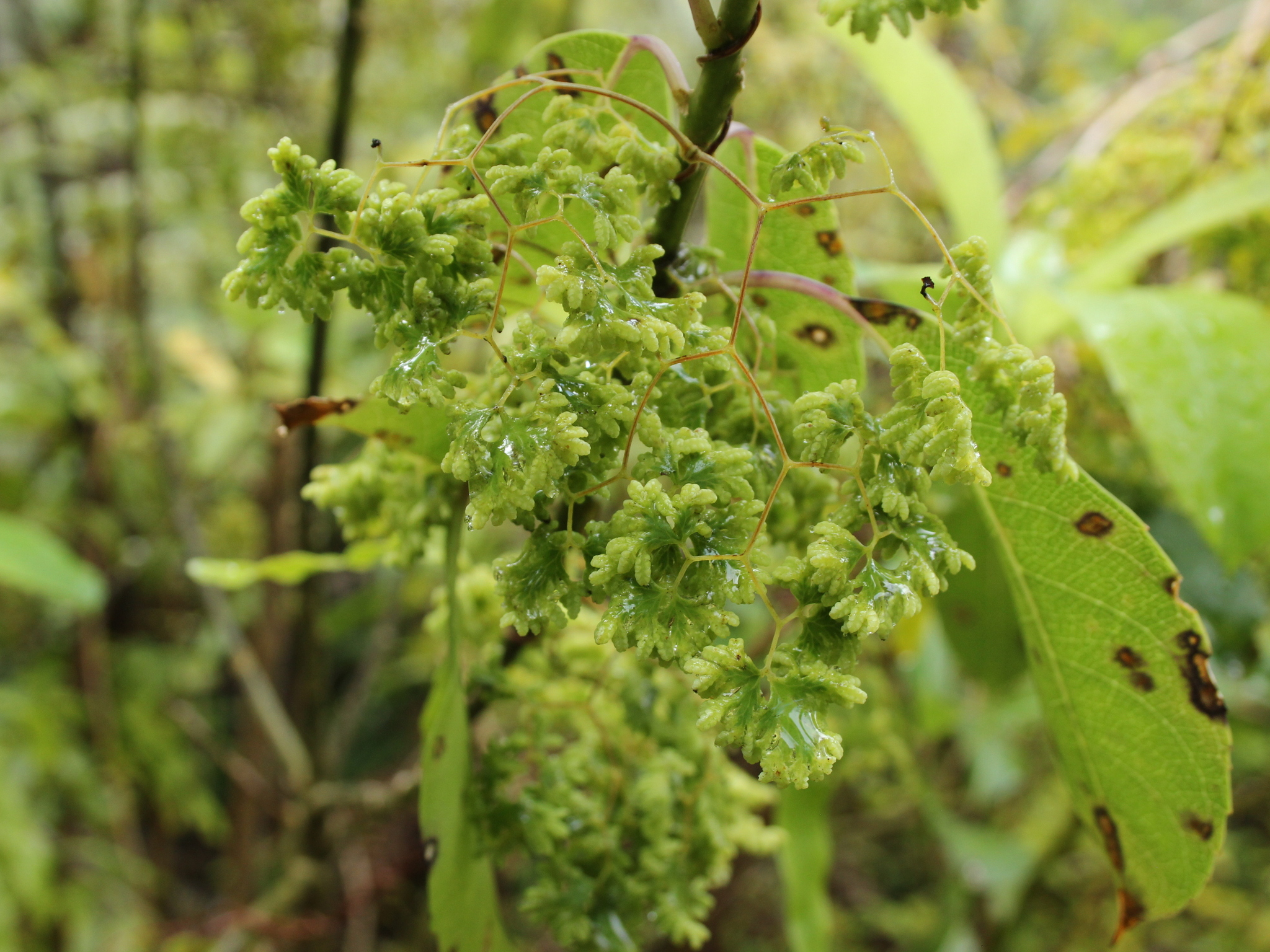

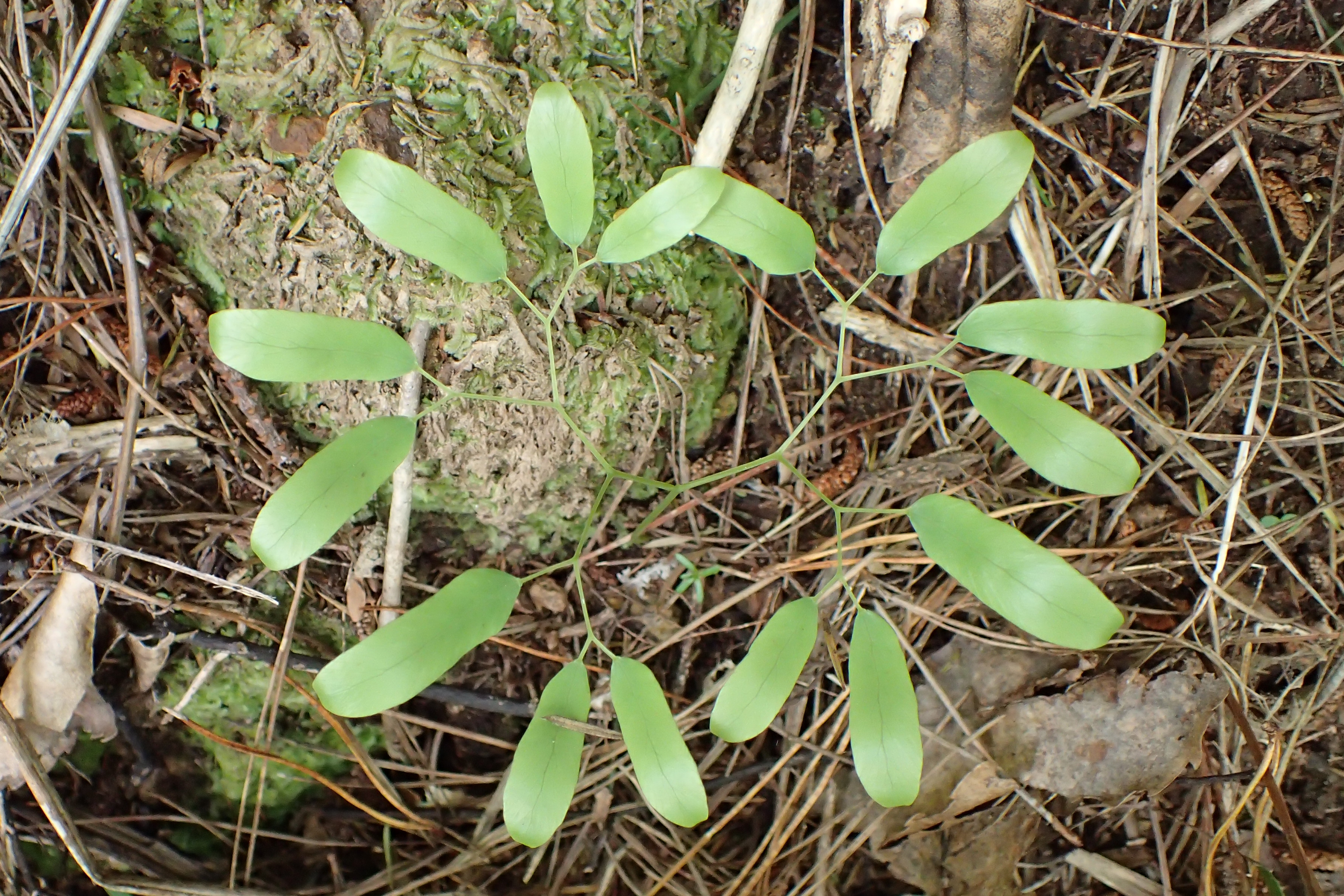
Young mangemange

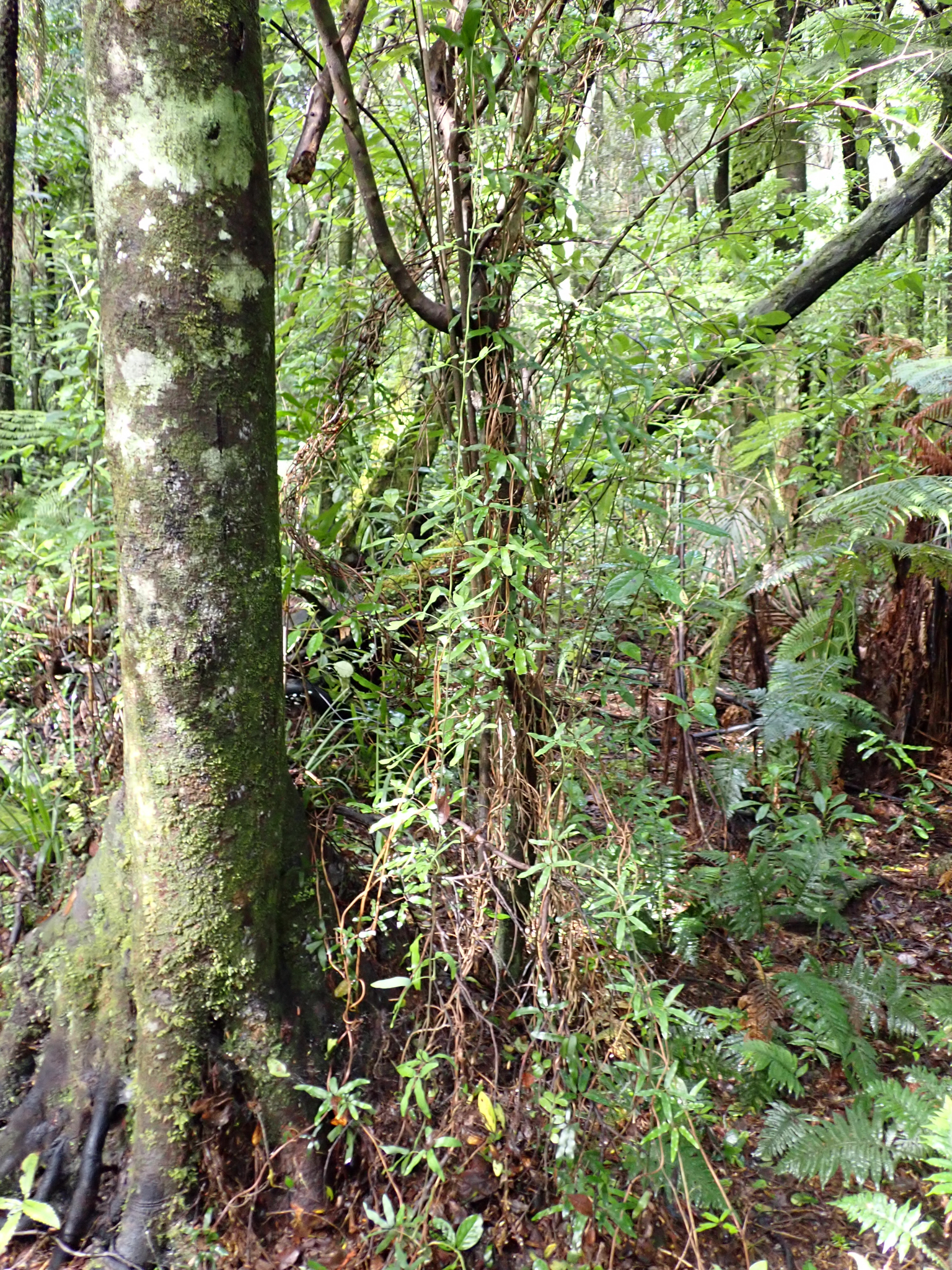
Vine-like stems of mangemange in the New Zealand bush

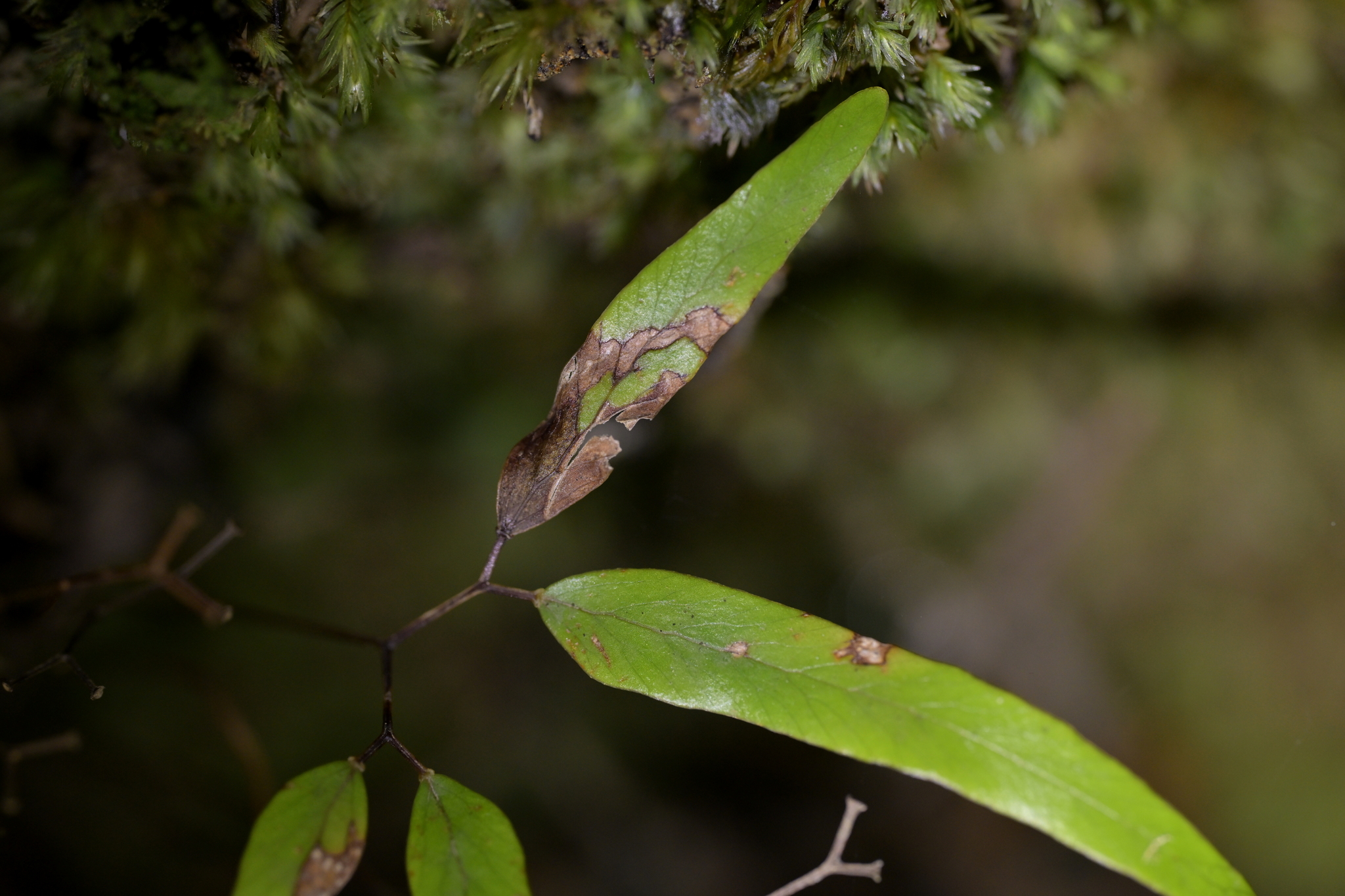
Leaves
