= Actinostachys pennula =

Scientific classification
- Kingdom: Plantae
- Clade: Tracheophytes
- Division: Polypodiophyta
- Class: Polypodiopsida
- Order: Schizaeales
- Family: Schizaeaceae
- Genus: Actinostachys
- Species: A. pennula

Binomial name
- Actinostachys pennula (Sw.) Hook.

Species of fern

Actinostachys pennula, the ray spiked fern or tropical curly-grass, is a fern native mainly to Southern Florida and is an endangered plant species.

== Names ==
S. germanii (Fée) Prantl; Actinostachys germanii Fée; Actinostachys pennula (Sw.) Hook.

== Distribution ==
Actinostachys pennula is naturally found in Northern and Southern America. Encompassing Florida of the Southeastern United States and Southern Mexico. As well as in the Caribbean, Mesoamerica, Brazil, and parts of Northern, Western and Southern South America. Sites in Florida where Actinostachys pennula have been sited are Miami Dade, Palm Beach, and Lee county.

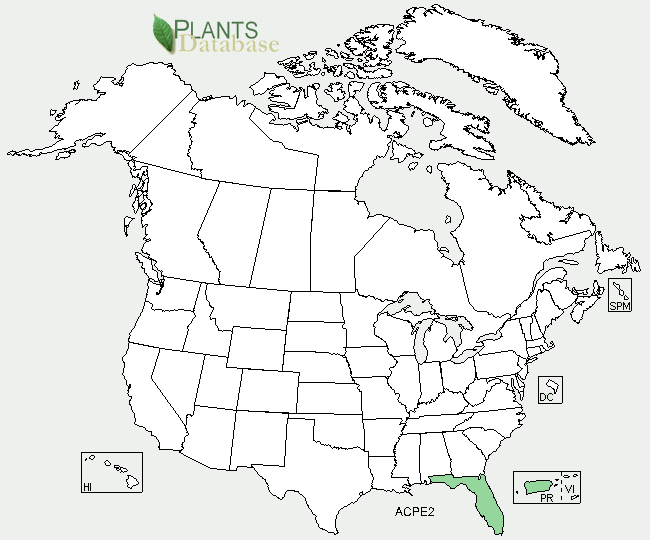
Distribution of Actinostachys pennula in the U.S.

== Habitat and ecology ==
Actinostachys pennula is a fern that grows in terrestrial environments. It is adapted to tropical regions. Actinostachys pennula is found near rotten tree stumps and litter that is decomposing in highly wet rain forests and baylands (wetlands that are continually reached by tides). It is a perennial plant. Normally found at an elevation of 0–500 feet. Best conditions are in wet, marshy areas with high temperatures and an abundance of sunlight. Individuals found in more sunny areas tend to be larger in size compared to their counterparts that live in more shady terrestrial environments.

== Morphology ==
Individuals of this species vary in size from 5–50 cm. Actinostachys pennula ferns range from small sizes living near decomposing leaf and tree matter to larger sizes with ones that live in places that are abundant in sunlight and are in wide open areas. It is a non-grass herb. The roots are dark and covered with rigid black hairs that are 2–3 mm in length. The rhizome is considered hairy and bristly due to these features. The stems are upright with their hairs in a single line. The stem of the Actinostachys pennula is not a singular structure. The stem is composed of many tiny, narrow stems that are commonly less than 1 mm in diameter. They reproduce rapidly from bases of old leaves. Thus, the stem bears more of a resemblance to a firmly packed, inter-grown bush than a solitary stem. Actinostachys pennula has leaves related to the stem in a cauline design which has not been observed in any other fern present today. Leaves are like grass and are 1–60 mm in length. The leaves are all fertile, do not have branches, and have long petioles that are .5–2 cm in length. The blades of the leaves have rays that are on very short rachis which give the false impression of a whorl-like pattern. The rays can range from 1–12 mm or 4–40 mm in length. All new leaves for the Actinostachys pennula are built from the base of leaves already produced by the plant. The mass of curly petioles gives Actinostachys pennula its nickname as the tropical curly grass plant. There is no main shoot apex as one leaf is produced from the previous one.

== Reproduction ==
Stachys, which means spike, refers to the fertile parts of the Actinostachys pennula which are fashioned in a spike-like manner. Juvenile individuals of the Actinostachys pennula have a big bulging gametophyte attached that is left over after maturation. The tuber of the gametophyte is sometimes mistaken for the stem because it is large and bulb-like.

== Conservation status ==
Actinostachys pennula is an endangered plant species according to the USDA. Actinostachys pennula is listed as an endangered species by FDACS and critically threatened by FNAI. Lygodium japonicum, which is a vine-like fern, can be an invasive species and after time can become the most prevalent species in an area. The native inhabitants can be endangered by this intrusive species and studies have shown that Lygodium japonicum threatens the species of Actinostachys pennula in its native habitat in Florida. Lygodium microphyllum is another species that threatens the survival of Actinostachys pennula and has pushed it out of many tree islands where Actinostachys pennula is usually found. Wildfires also threaten the survival of Actinostachys pennula. It is estimated that less than a thousand Actinostachys pennula plants exist in Boynton Beach Florida where the Loxahatchee National Wildlife Refuge is located.
