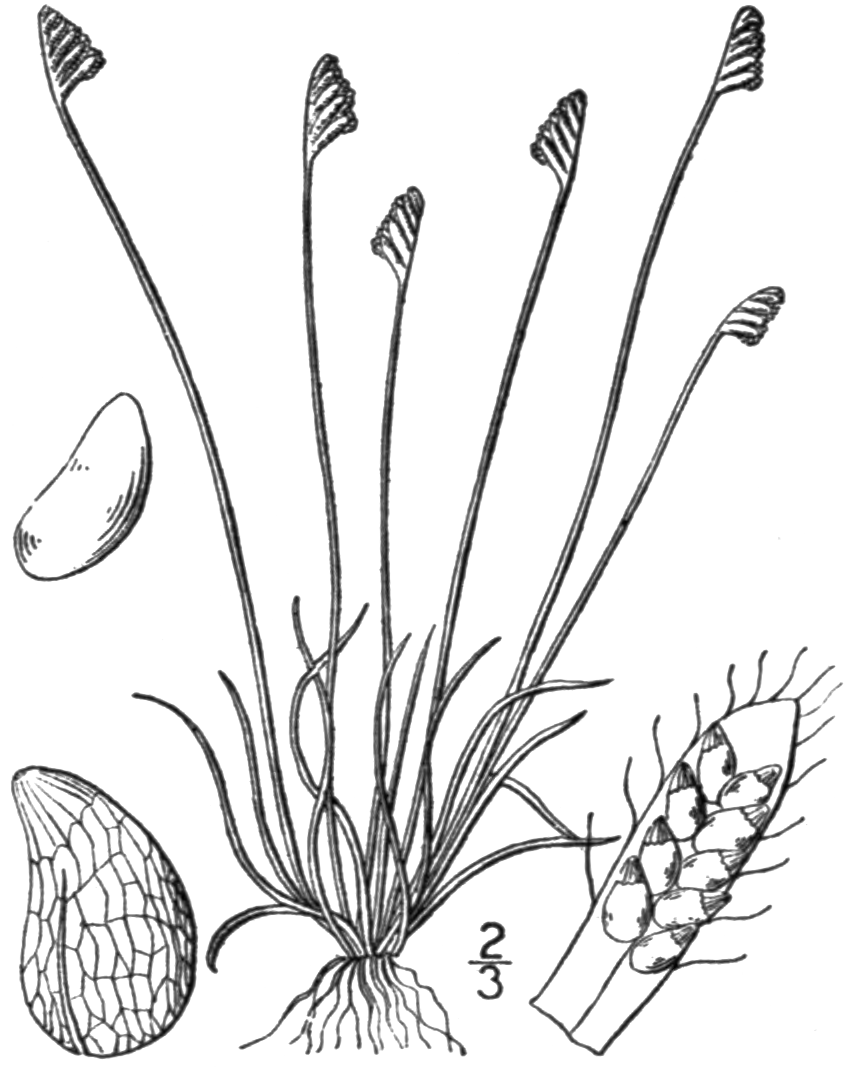
- 1913 illustration

Scientific classification
- Kingdom: Plantae
- Clade: Tracheophytes
- Division: Polypodiophyta
- Class: Polypodiopsida
- Order: Schizaeales
- Family: Schizaeaceae
- Genus: Schizaea
- Species: S. pusilla

Binomial name
- Schizaea pusilla Pursh

= Schizaea pusilla =

Species of fern

Schizaea pusilla, the little curlygrass fern, is a species of fern in the family Schizaeaceae. It was first described by the German-American botanist Frederick Traugott Pursh in 1814. It is native to New Brunswick, Newfoundland, and Nova Scotia in Canada, the French overseas territory of Saint Pierre and Miquelon, and New York, New Jersey, Delaware, and North Carolina in the United States of America. It is listed as endangered by the state of New York.
