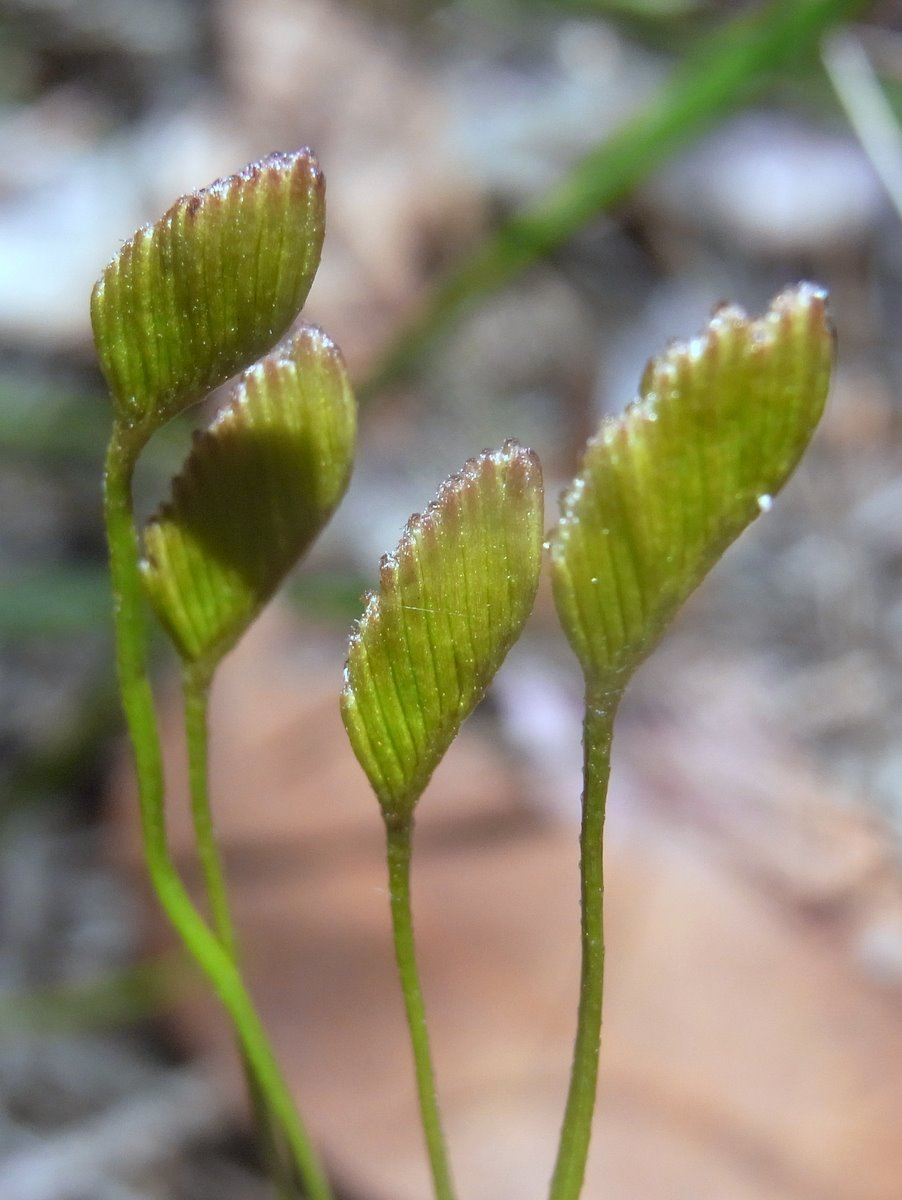
- Schizaea bifida from Ku-ring-gai Chase National Park, Australia

Scientific classification
- Kingdom: Plantae
- Clade: Tracheophytes
- Division: Polypodiophyta
- Class: Polypodiopsida
- Order: Schizaeales
- Family: Schizaeaceae
- Genus: Schizaea
- Species: S. bifida

Binomial name
- Schizaea bifida Willd.

= Schizaea bifida =

Forked comb fern

Species of plant

Schizaea bifida, better known as the forked comb fern is a fairly common fern found in eastern and southern Australia. Also seen in New Zealand and New Caledonia. In New South Wales it is found near the coast in heathland and eucalyptus woodland. Seen as a low plant, 10 to 35 cm tall. The generic name Schizaea is from the Greek, meaning “to cleave or split”. Bifida means split in two.

This plant first appeared in scientific literature in the year 1802, published by the German botanist, Carl Ludwig Willdenow.
