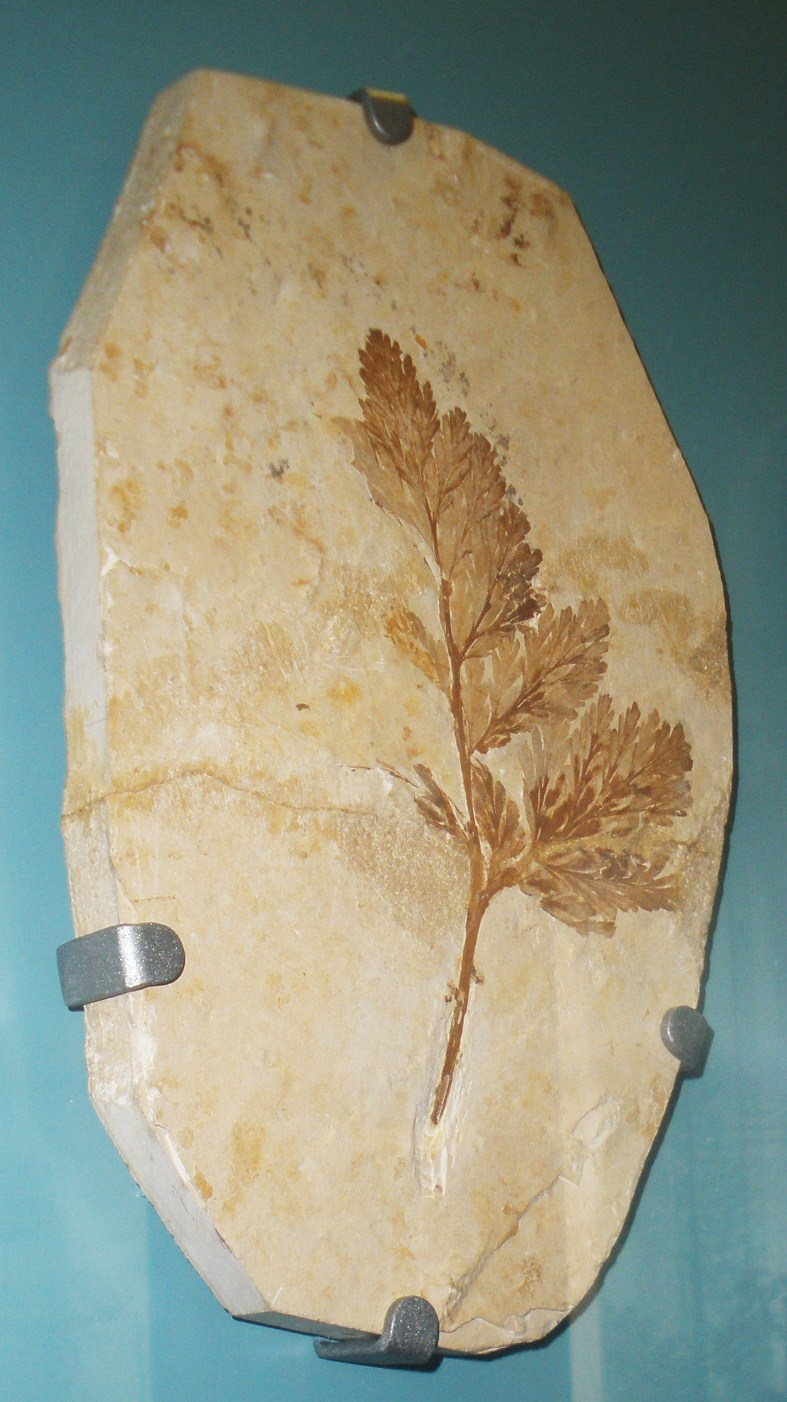
- A Brazilian fossil of Ruffordia at the Senckenberg Museum of Frankfurt in Germany

Scientific classification
- Kingdom: Plantae
- Clade: Tracheophytes
- Division: Polypodiophyta
- Class: Polypodiopsida
- Order: Schizaeales
- Family: Schizaeaceae
- Genus: †Ruffordia; Seward

Species
- †R.gopperti; †R.acrodenta; †R.subcretacea

= Ruffordia =

Ruffordia Temporal range: Middle Jurassic–Eocene

Extinct genus of ferns

Ruffordia is an extinct genus of cosmopolitan ferns that thrived during the Mesozoic and Cenozoic Eras, particularly from the Jurassic through the Cretaceous periods with the last species dying out during the Eocene. It was notable for being a widespread and abundant ground cover in open, savanna-like ecosystems, especially in regions dominated by gymnosperms and early angiosperms. Ecologically, Ruffordia was quite similar to the modern Bracken fern (Pteridium), which also forms dense, clonal colonies across open habitats. Despite this similarity, it was closer phylogenetically to Schizaeales. Three species are known, Ruffordia gopperti, Ruffordia acrodenta and Ruffordia subcretacea.

== Ecology ==
Ruffordia likely was adapted for colonization of disturbed freshwater swamp plains, taking advantage of the destruction of competitor plants. There is also evidence of Ruffordia acting as a host species for galling insects.

== Distribution ==
Fossils are known from New Zealand, China, Peru, Brazil, Canada, Spain, Belgium, The United States, Madagascar, South Korea and Germany.
