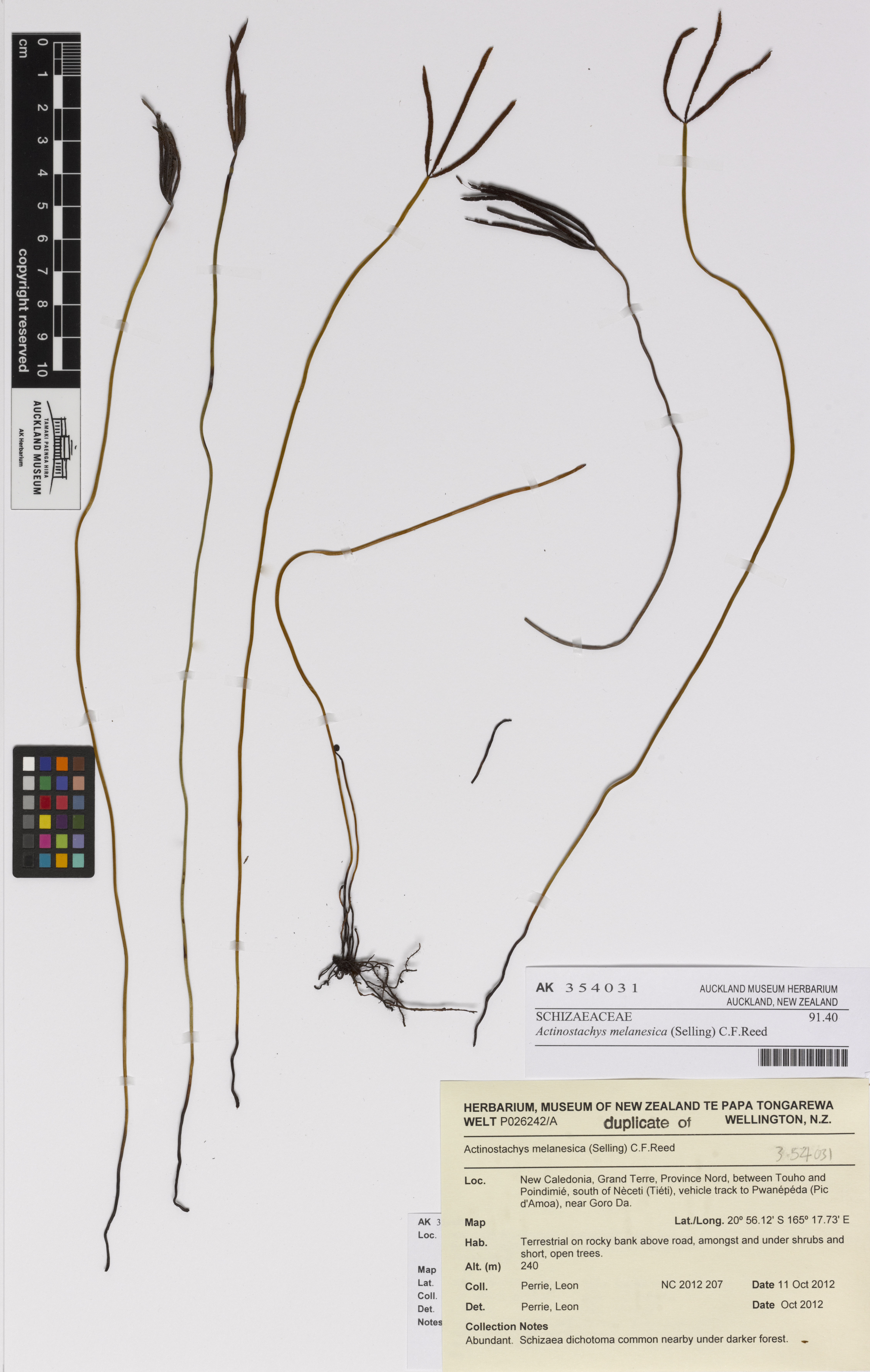
- A. melanesica in the collections of the Auckland Museum

Scientific classification
- Kingdom: Plantae
- Clade: Embryophytes
- Clade: Tracheophytes
- Division: Polypodiophyta
- Class: Polypodiopsida
- Order: Schizaeales
- Family: Schizaeaceae
- Genus: Actinostachys; Wall.

Type species
- Actinostachys digitata (L.) Wallich ex Reed

Species
- See text

= Actinostachys =

Genus of ferns

Actinostachys is a genus of small ferns originally included in the genus Schizaea. The genus was segregated on the basis of the flabelliform (fan-shaped) laminae. The genus is colloquially called the ray ferns.

== Phylogeny ==
As of June 2026, World Ferns accepted the following seventeen species:

Phylogeny of Actinostachys

- Actinostachys
  - A. digitata (L.) Wallich ex C.F. Reed
  - - A. wagneri (Selling) C.F. Reed
    - - - A. pennula (Sw.) Hook.
        - A. subtrijuga (Mart.) C. Presl
      - - A. confusa (Selling) C.F. Reed
        - - A. laevigata (Mett.) C.F. Reed
          - A. melanesica (Selling) C.F. Reed

Other species include:
- Actinostachys balansae (Fourn.) C.F. Reed
- Actinostachys inopinata (Selling) C.F. Reed
- Actinostachys intermedia (Mett.) C.F. Reed
- Actinostachys macrofunda Bierh.
- Actinostachys minuta Amoroso & Coritico
- Actinostachys oligostachys Bierh.
- Actinostachys plana (Fourn.) C.F. Reed
- Actinostachys simplex Amoroso & Coritico
- Actinostachys spirophylla (W. Troll) C.F. Reed
- Actinostachys tenuis (Fourn.) C.F. Reed
