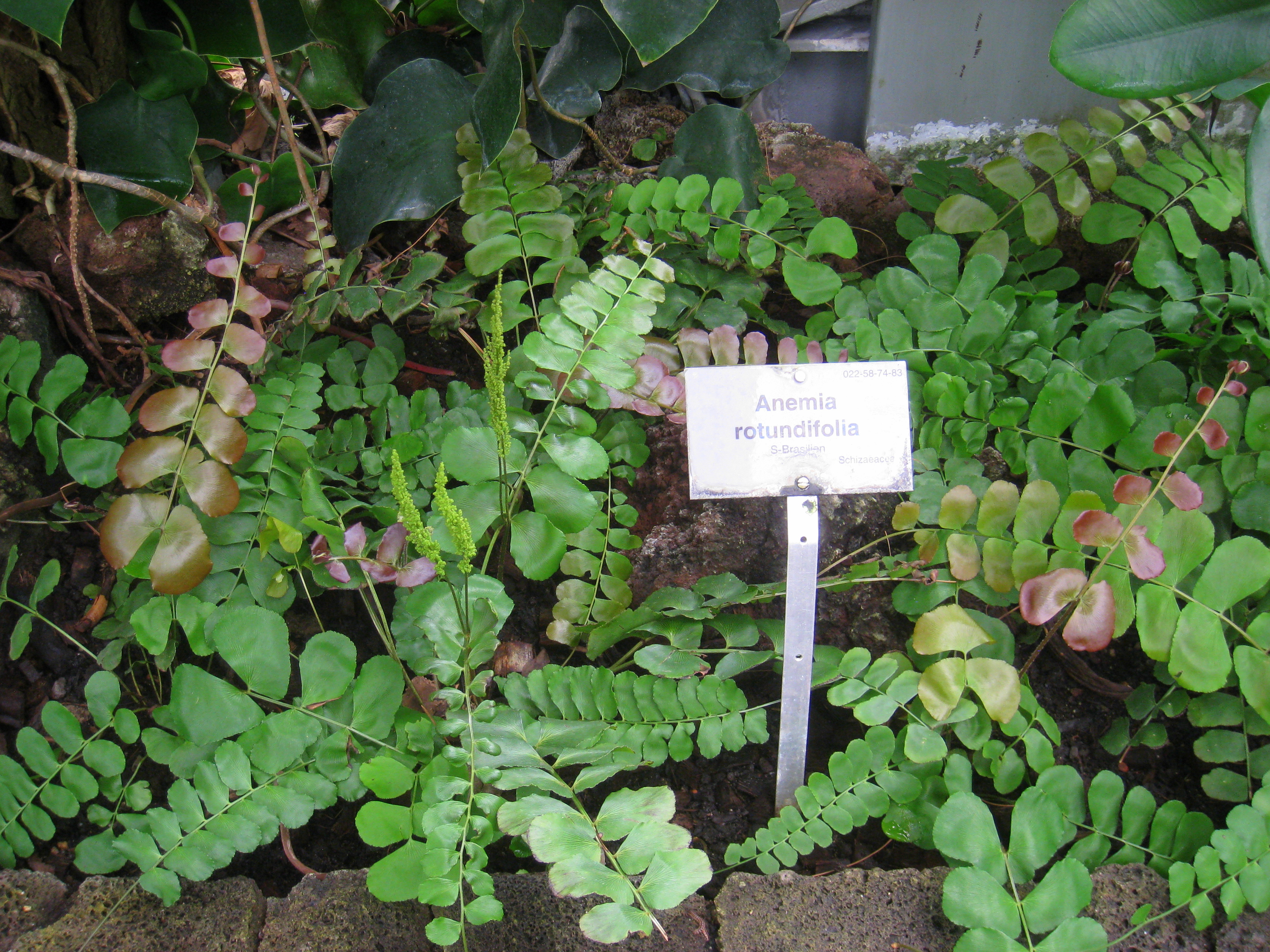
- Anemia rotundifolia

Scientific classification
- Kingdom: Plantae
- Clade: Tracheophytes
- Division: Polypodiophyta
- Class: Polypodiopsida
- Order: Schizaeales
- Family: Anemiaceae
- Genus: Anemia
- Species: A. rotundifolia

Binomial name
- Anemia rotundifolia Schrad.

= Anemia rotundifolia =

Species of fern

Anemia rotundifolia is a fern species in the genus Anemia, sometimes called flowering ferns.
