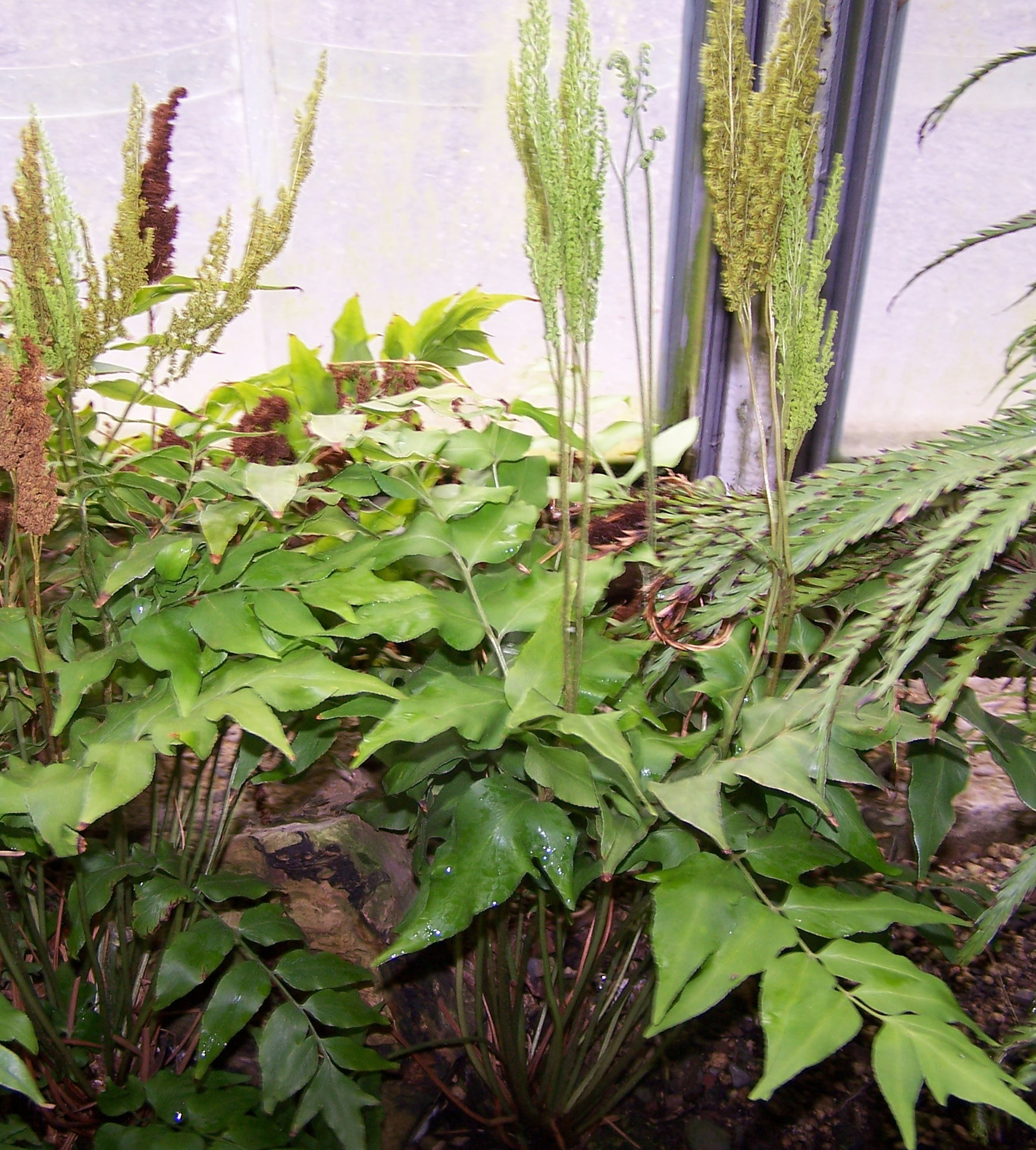
- Mexican flowering fern (A. mexicana)

Conservation status
- Apparently Secure (NatureServe)

Scientific classification
- Kingdom: Plantae
- Clade: Tracheophytes
- Division: Polypodiophyta
- Class: Polypodiopsida
- Order: Schizaeales
- Family: Anemiaceae
- Genus: Anemia
- Species: A. mexicana

Binomial name
- Anemia mexicana Klotzsch

= Anemia mexicana =

Species of fern

Anemia mexicana, the Mexican flowering fern, is a fern species in the genus Anemia, sometimes called flowering ferns. It is native to much of Mexico and the Edwards Plateau and Trans-Pecos regions of Texas. The "flowers" are upright fertile fronds that can be mistaken for true flowers.

== Description ==
The fronds of Anemia mexicana arise at multiple intervals (rather than in a tight clump) from a horizontal rhizome about 2 millimeters (0.08 in) in diameter, covered with many stiff, dark brown hairs. The fronds are upright and straight. They are, in total, between 30 to 60 centimeters (10 to 20 in) long, occasionally as short as 15 centimeters (5.9 in). About half of that length is the stipe (the leaf stalk, below the blade), which is about 1 millimeter (0.04 in), hairless, and straw-colored.
