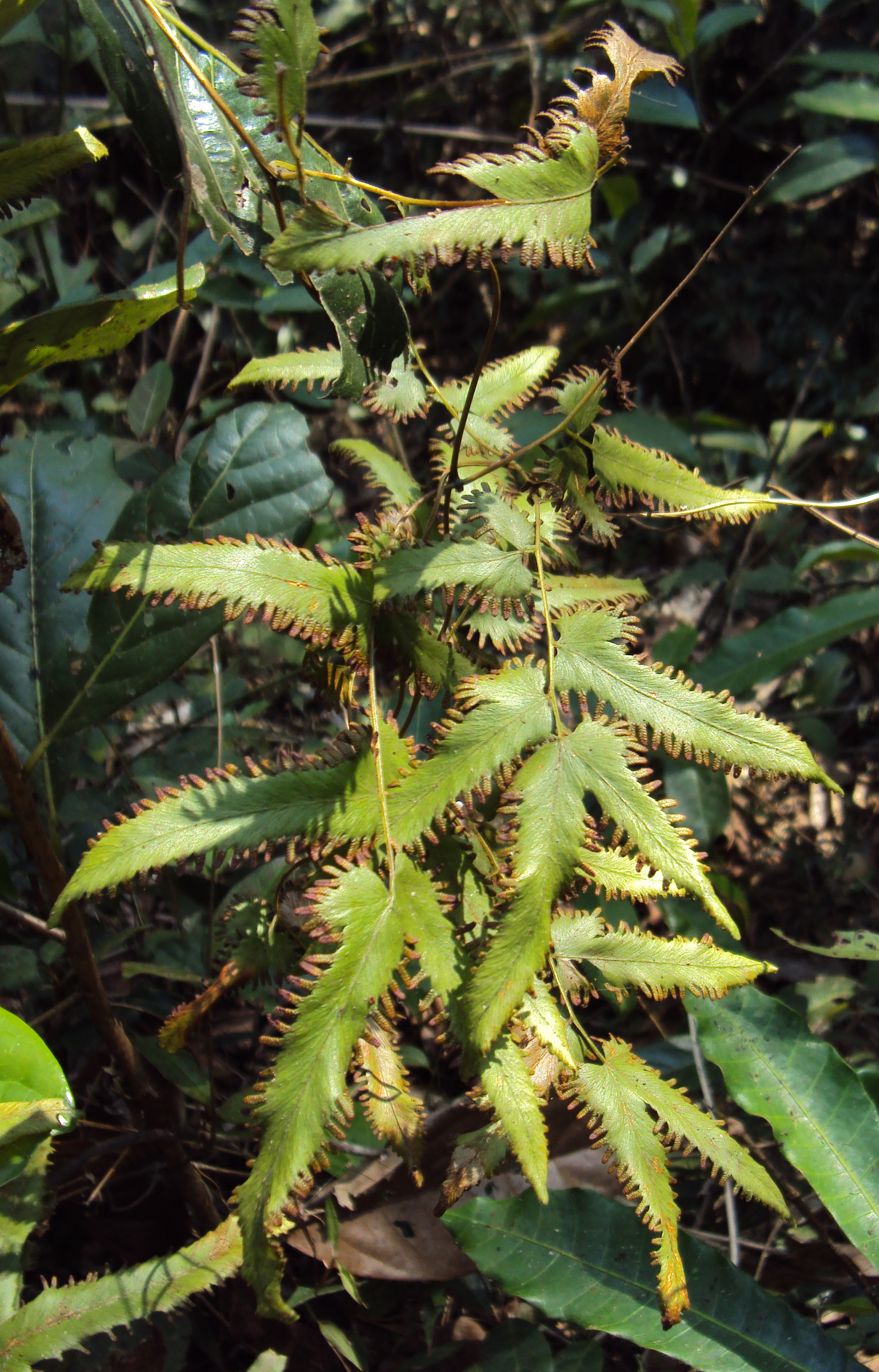

Scientific classification
- Kingdom: Plantae
- Clade: Tracheophytes
- Division: Polypodiophyta
- Class: Polypodiopsida
- Order: Schizaeales
- Family: Lygodiaceae
- Genus: Lygodium
- Species: L. flexuosum

Binomial name
- Lygodium flexuosum (L.) Sw.

= Lygodium flexuosum =

Species of fern

Lygodium flexuosum, also known as the flexuose climbing fern, is a rhizomatous perennial climbing fern native to tropical and subtropical Asia and northern Australia. It produces thin, wiry fronds that twine and climb, arising from horizontal rhizomes and stolons on or beneath the ground. The pinnae are oppositely arranged, triangular in shape, with fertile pinnae margins forming finger-like projections that bear sporangia for spore production. Unlike flowering plants, this species reproduces by spores and often forms dense vine growth in wet tropical habitats.

== Taxonomy ==
Linnaeus described this species as Ophioglossum flexuosum in his Species Plantarum of 1753.
