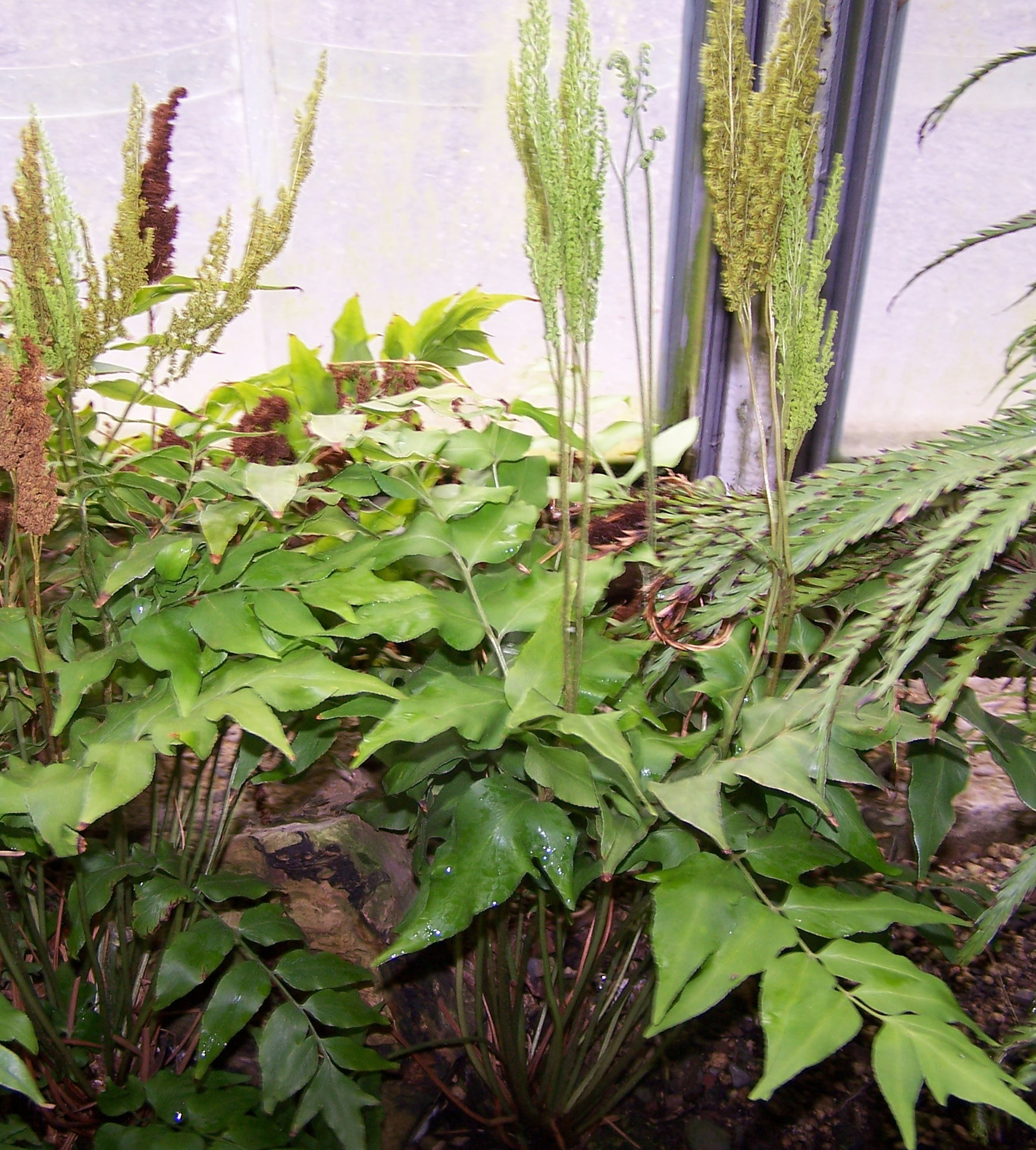
- Mexican flowering fern (A. mexicana)

Scientific classification
- Kingdom: Plantae
- Clade: Embryophytes
- Clade: Tracheophytes
- Division: Polypodiophyta
- Class: Polypodiopsida
- Order: Schizaeales
- Family: Anemiaceae; Link
- Genus: Anemia; Sw.

Type species
- Anemia phyllitidis (L.) Sw.

Species
- See text

Synonyms
- Anemiaebotrys Fee 1869; Anemidictyon Smith 1841 ex Hook. 1842; Anemirhiza Smith 1855; Colina Greene 1893; Coptophyllum Gardner 1842 non Korth. 1850; Cryptophyllum Schlechtendahl 1843; Hemianemia (Prantl 1881) Reed 1948; Mohria Swartz 1806 non Britton 1893; Ornithopteris Bernhardi 1805 non (Agardh 1839) Smith 1875; Spathepteris Presl 1846; Trochopteris Gardner 1842

= Anemia (plant) =

Genus of ferns

Anemia is a genus of ferns. It is the only genus in the family Anemiaceae in the Pteridophyte Phylogeny Group classification of 2016 (PPG I). Alternatively, the genus may be placed as the only genus in the subfamily Anemioideae of a more broadly defined family Schizaeaceae, the family placement used in Plants of the World Online as of November 2019. Its species are sometimes called flowering ferns, but this term is more commonly applied to ferns of the genus Osmunda. Fronds are dimorphic; in fertile fronds, the two lowermost pinnae are highly modified to bear the sporangia.

Ferns in this genus have chromosome numbers based on x=38: n=38, 76, 114.

== Phylogeny ==
The genus Anemia was first described by the Swedish botanist Olof Swartz in 1806. The family Anemiaceae was created by Johann Link in 1841. In the Pteridophyte Phylogeny Group classification of 2016 (PPG I), Anemia includes Mohria and Colina and is the only genus in the family. Some sources do not separate the family Anemiaceae from Schizaeaceae.

Phylogeny of Anemia

- - - (Anemirhiza)
      - A. colimensis Mickel
      - - A. cicutaria Kuntze (hemlock fern)
        - - - A. abbottii Maxon
            - A. portoricensis Maxon (Puerto Rican flowering fern)
          - - - A. adiantifolia (L.) Sw. (pine Fern)
              - - A. mexicana Klotzsch (Mexican flowering fern)
                - A. wrightii Baker (Wright's flowering fern)
  - - A. lanipes C.Chr.
    - - (Mohria)
        - - A. caffrorum (L.) Christenh.
          - A. marginalis (Sav.) Christenh.
        - - A. vestita (Baker) Christenh.
          - - A. mohriana Christenh.
            - A. nudiuscula (J.P.Roux) Christenh.
      - (Anemia)
        - - section Coptophyllum
            - A. rutifolia Mart.
            - - A. delphinopolica Doweld 2020
              - - A. elaphoglossoides Mickel
                - - A. pyrenaea Taub.
                  - - A. buniifolia (Gardner) T.Moore
                    - A. marginata Mickel
        - - A. guatemalensis Maxon
          - - - A. karwinskyana (C.Presl) Prantl
              - - A. ferruginea Kunth
                - A. myriophylla Christ
            - - - section Gardnerianae
                  - A. gardneri Hook.
                  - A. lanuginosa Bongard
              - - - - section Trochopteris
                      - A. trichorhiza Gardner
                      - - A. eximia Taub.
                        - - A. elegans (Gardner) C.Presl
                          - A. lanata Mickel
                  - - - section Anemiaebotrys
                        - A. aspera (Fée) Baker
                        - A. labiakii Mickel
                    - - - section Millefoliae
                          - A. glareosa Gardner
                          - A. millefolia Gardner
                      - - - - A. imbricata Sturm
                            - A. raddiana Link
                          - - A. organensis Rosenst.
                            - - A. spicantoides Mabb.
                              - A. villosa Willd.
                        - - - A. patens Mickel & Labiak
                            - A. retroflexa Brade
                          - - section Tomentosae
                              - - A. irwinii Mickel
                                - - A. clinata Mickel
                                  - A. smithii Brade
                              - - A. flexuosa (Sav.) Sw.
                                - - A. australis (Mickel) M.Kessler & A.R.Sm.
                                  - A. tomentosa (Sav.) Sw.
                - - section Anemia
                    - - A. schimperiana C.Presl
                      - - A. angolensis Alston
                        - A. simii Tardieu
                    - - - A. warmingii Prantl
                        - - A. dregeana Kunze
                          - A. hirta (L.) Sw. (streambank flowering fern)
                      - - - A. hirsuta (L.) Sw. (hairy flowering fern)
                          - A. tenera Pohl
                        - - - - A. jaliscana Maxon
                              - - A. affinis Baker
                                - A. multiplex Mickel
                            - - - A. andersonii Mickel & Labiak
                                - A. sertaneja Mickel & Labiak
                              - - A. humilis (Cavanilles) Swartz
                                - - A. pubescens Mickel & Labiak
                                  - - A. mynsseniana Mickel
                                    - - A. oblongifolia (Cav.) Sw.
                                      - - A. hispida Kunze
                                        - A. presliana Prantl
                          - - A. luetzelburgii Rosenst.
                            - - A. rosulata Mickel
                              - - A. dentata Gardner
                                - - A. salvadorensis Mickel & Seiler
                                  - - - A. collina Raddi
                                      - A. nicaraguensis Mickel
                                    - - A. rotundifolia Schrad.
                                      - - A. nervosa Pohl
                                        - - A. phyllitidis (L.) Sw.
                                          - - A. lancea Christ
                                            - - A. repens Raddi
                                              - - A. wettsteinii Christ
                                                - - A. herzogii Rosenst.
                                                  - A. underwoodiana Maxon

Other species include:
- subgenus Anemia
  - Anemia alfredi-rohrii Brade
  - Anemia antrorsa Mickel
  - Anemia ayacuchensis Mickel
  - Anemia barbatula Christ
  - Anemia bartlettii Mickel
  - Anemia blackii Brade
  - Anemia blechnoides Sm.
  - Anemia brandegeei Davenp.
  - Anemia candidoi Brade
  - Anemia cipoensis Sehnem
  - Anemia costata Sehnem
  - Anemia damazii Christ
  - Anemia dardanoi Brade
  - Anemia delicatula Mickel
  - Anemia denticulata Mickel
  - Anemia × didicusana L.D.Gómez
  - Anemia diversifolia Schrad.
  - Anemia donnell-smithii Maxon
  - Anemia duartei Brade
  - Anemia eriodes Mickel
  - Anemia × espiritosantensis Brade
  - Anemia familiaris Mickel
  - Anemia gomesii Christ
  - Anemia hatschbachii Sehnem
  - Anemia heterodoxa Christ
  - Anemia incisa Schrad.
  - Anemia intermedia Copel. ex M.E.Jones
  - Anemia laxa Lindm.
  - Anemia lindsaeoides Mickel
  - Anemia madagascariensis C.Chr.
  - Anemia mandiocana Raddi
  - Anemia × mexiae L.S.Rabelo & Schwartsb.
  - Anemia mickelii L.S.Rabelo & Schwartsb.
  - Anemia mirabilis Brade
  - Anemia munchii Christ
  - Anemia nana Baker
  - Anemia nigerica Alston
  - Anemia oblanceolata Mickel
  - Anemia obovata Maxon
  - Anemia ouropretana Christ
  - Anemia pallida Gardner
  - Anemia palmarum Lindm.
  - Anemia × paraphyllitidis Mickel
  - Anemia pastinacaria Moritz ex Prantl
  - Anemia perrieriana C.Chr.
  - Anemia pinnata Sehnem
  - Anemia pohliana Sturm
  - Anemia porrecta Mickel
  - Anemia × promiscua L.S.Rabelo & Schwartsb.
  - Anemia pulchra Pohl
  - Anemia pumilio Mickel
  - Anemia rauhiana Mickel
  - Anemia × recondita Mickel
  - Anemia rigida Sehnem
  - Anemia schaeferi Sehnem
  - Anemia × semihirsuta Mickel
  - Anemia × semihispida L.S.Rabelo & Schwartsb.
  - Anemia sessilis (Jeanp.) C.Chr.
  - Anemia simplicior (Christ) Mickel
  - Anemia tenella (Cav.) Sw.
  - Anemia tripinnata Copel.
  - Anemia ulbrichtii Rosenst.
  - Anemia ulei Christ
  - Anemia × zanonii Mickel
- subgenus Anemirhiza
  - Anemia alternifolia Mickel
  - Anemia aurita Sw.
  - Anemia coriacea Gris.
  - Anemia cuneata Kuntze
  - Anemia speciosa C.Presl
  - Anemia voerkeliana Duek
- subgenus Mohria
  - Anemia lepigera (Baker) Christenh.
  - Anemia saxatilis (J.P.Roux) Christenh.
