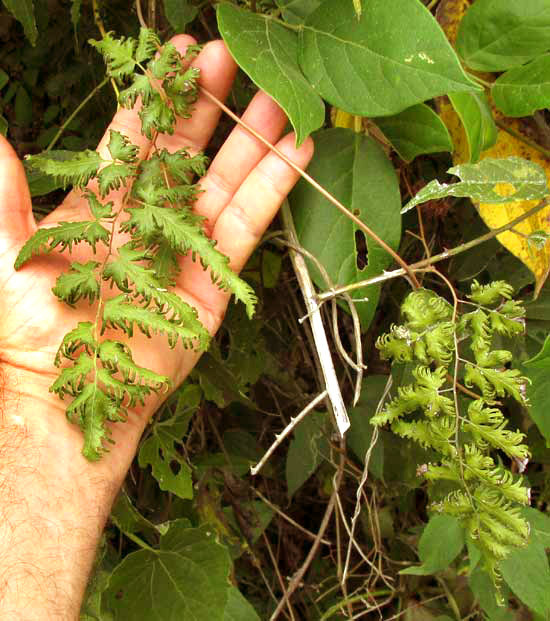
- Fertile pinnae arising from the twining rachis

Scientific classification
- Kingdom: Plantae
- Clade: Embryophytes
- Clade: Tracheophytes
- Division: Polypodiophyta
- Class: Polypodiopsida
- Order: Schizaeales
- Family: Lygodiaceae
- Genus: Lygodium
- Species: L. venustum

Binomial name
- Lygodium venustum Sw.

Synonyms
- List: Hydroglossum hastatum Willd.; Hydroglossum hirsutum Willd.; Lygodium commutatum C.Presl; Lygodium hastatum Desv.; Lygodium mexicanum C.Presl; Lygodium mucronulatum J.W.Sturm; Lygodium palmatilobum J.W.Sturm; Lygodium pohlianum C.Presl; Lygodium polymorphum f. glabra R.Knuth; Lygodium polymorphum f. hirsuta R.Knuth; Lygodium polymorphum var. hirsutum Farw.; Lygodium polymorphum var. palmatilobum Farw.; Lygodium schiedeanum C.Presl; Lygodium venustum f. glabra Maury; Lygodium venustum var. granatense Christ; Lygodium venustum f. hirsuta Maury; Lygodium volubile var. hirsutum Bonap.

= Lygodium venustum =

Species of plant

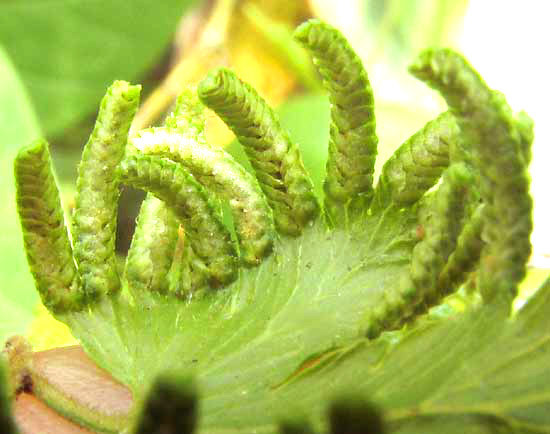
Spore-producing lobes of an ultimate segment

Lygodium venustum, with no widely used common name other than climbing fern, which is applicable to all species of the genus Lygodium, is a fern native to tropical parts the Americas.

== Description ==
With Lygodium venustum and other Lygodium species, what appears to be a twining stem with several compound leaves, or fronds, actually is just one big leaf, with the apparent stem being the leaf's twining rachis. The actual stem is a rhizome growing below ground or at the ground's surface. Keeping this unusual growth pattern in mind, here are other key features of Lygodium venustum:

- The subterranean rhizome reaches up to 2 mm (1/16 in) in diameter and bears brown hairs.
- The leaf's rachis is straw-colored, wiry, twining, variously hairy and with indeterminate growth. Leaves may become 3-4 times pinnately compound. The first-order leaflets, or pinnae, produce two side subdivisions, or "pinnules." The pinna's central lobe is much the largest, up to 10 cm (4 in) long and 1.4 cm (1/2 in) wide. Margins are finely toothed.
- Spores are produced on cylindrical lobes about 1 mm (1/32 in) wide growing at the margins of the leaf's ultimate divisions, the "fertile pinnae." Each lobe bears two rows of sporangia, one row on each side of a midvein, with each sporangium covered by yellow, pocket-like flaps of tissue serving as "indusia." The flaps bear white hairs up to 0.5 mm (1/64 in) long.

=== Leaf development ===
A plant's first juvenile leaves grow only up to about 20 cm (8 in) long and may be deeply cut longitudinally. The rachis rapidly elongates near the leaf's tip, but its pinnae expand slowly. Pinnae have terminal "dormant buds," which begin growing if the main leaf tip is injured or destroyed. If this happens, the dormant buds may develop branching patterns as if they were entire leaves, thus greatly diversifying the leaf's structure. Over half of the leaves may die within their first 3 months, while over 10% can survive for up to 30 months.

== Distribution ==
Lygodium venustum occurs from the southern half of Mexico and the Greater Antilles south through Central America and in South America as far south as Peru, Bolivia, Brazil and northern Argentina.

== Habitat ==
In Mexico's Yucatan Peninsula, Lygodium venustum inhabits various forest types and disturbed, weedy areas such as roadsides, agricultural fields, etc. In Colombia the species lives in forests and woodlands, savannas, shrubland, native grasslands and inland wetlands. In Trinidad it inhabits partly sunny banks and grassy, open spaces.

== Ecology ==
Because of the potentially long life span of leaves of Lygodium venustum, the species is considered a successful pioneer species in disturbed vegetation, as well as a competitive weed in Mexican vanilla plantations.

In Argentina, dark brown spots on leaves of Lygodium venustum were found to be caused by the fungal disease organism Pestalotiopsis maculans.

== In traditional medicine ==
In Mexico, Lygodium venustum is taken orally to treat snake bites and scorpion stings. The root and leaves can be ground and a tea made, or else the paste can be applied to the affected part. Sometimes it also is taken as an infusion for problems of the gastrointestinal tract such as diarrhea, or just nausea.

== Taxonomy ==
The date of 1803 usually is stated for the publication in which Olof Swartz formally described and named Lygodium venustum. However, the publication date of 1801 is printed in the book. Botanical databases may list the publication date as "1801(2): 303 (1803)," indicating that the description is in the second part of the book, volume 2, appearing in 1803. Swartz had collected many biological specimens in the West Indies.

On the island of Trinidad where Lygodium venustum and L. micans both are common species and often grow near one another at forest edges, a plant was found with features intermediate the two species, an apparent hybrid.

=== Etymology ===
The genus name Lygodium is based on the Greek lygodes, meaning "flexible," referring to the twining rachises of leaves of the species.

The species name venustum is the accusative, singular form of the Latin venustus, meaning "attractive, charming, graceful" etc.
