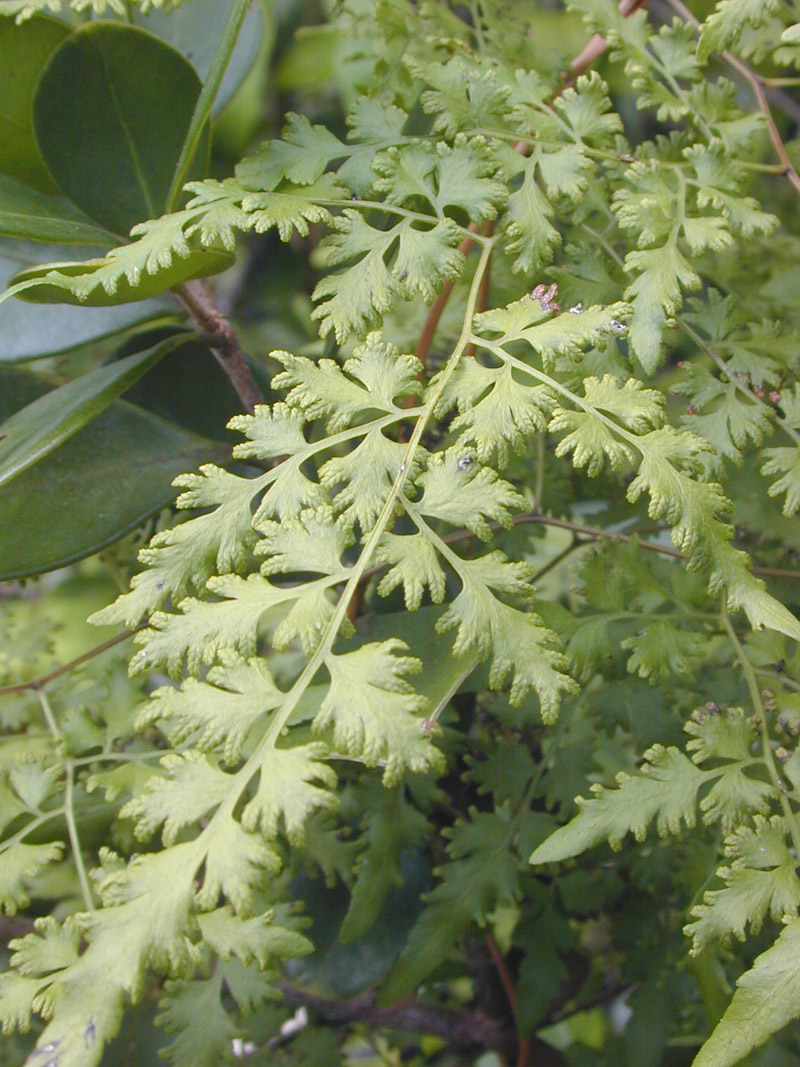
- Lygodium japonicum

Scientific classification
- Kingdom: Plantae
- Clade: Embryophytes
- Clade: Tracheophytes
- Division: Polypodiophyta
- Class: Polypodiopsida
- Order: Schizaeales
- Family: Lygodiaceae; C.Presl
- Genus: Lygodium; Sw.

Type species
- Lygodium scandens (L.) Sw.

Species
- See text

Synonyms
- Arthrolygodes Presl 1845; Cteisium Michaux 1803; Gisopteris Bernh. 1800; Hugona Cavanilles ex Roemer 1801; Hydroglossum Willdenow 1802; Lygodictyon Smith ex Hook. 1842; Odontopteris Bernhardi 1800 non (Brongniart 1822) Sternberg 1825; Ramondia de Mirbel 1801; Ugena Cavanilles 1801; Vallifilix Du Petit-Thouars 1806

= Lygodium =

Lygodium Temporal range: Cretaceous–Recent

Genus of ferns

Lygodium (climbing fern) is a genus of about 40 species of ferns, native to tropical regions across the world, with a few temperate species in eastern Asia and eastern North America. It is the sole genus in the family Lygodiaceae in the Pteridophyte Phylogeny Group classification of 2016 (PPG I). Alternatively, the genus may be placed as the only genus in the subfamily Lygodioideae of a more broadly defined family Schizaeaceae, the family placement used in Plants of the World Online as of November 2019. Per recent molecular evidence, Lygodiaceae is thought to have diverged relatively early from the other members of the Schizaeales due to the relatively high level of synonymous sequence divergence between the families within the Schizaeales.

== Description ==
Lygodium are unusual in that the rachis, or midrib, of the frond is thin, flexible, and long, the frond unrolling with indeterminate growth and the rachis twining around supports, so that each frond forms a distinct vine. The fronds may be from 3–12 m (9.8–39.4 ft) long, depending on the species. They are also easily identifiable by their possession of apical buds that lay dormant until damage to the rachis occurs, allowing them a high degree of endurance.

== Range ==
Lygodium is a wide ranging genus with native populations existing in Asia, Australasia, Africa, and North and South America. The genus is largely pan-tropical, with the center of diversity being Pacific islands, such as Borneo, the Philippine islands, and New Guinea.There do exist several species tolerant of temperate climates such as Lygodium palmatum, which is endemic to the Appalachian region of eastern North America, and Lygodium japonicum, which is native to Japan, but highly invasive in the Southeastern United States. For more on this, refer to the "As invasive species" section below. The lack of extant Lygodium species in Europe is commonly attributed to the Pleistocene glaciation wiping them out. Similar extirpations did not occur in other high middle and high latitude areas, such as the United States and Japan that do have Lygodium populations at present. This discrepancy is thought to be due to the East-West orientation of the European Alps preventing southward migration of Lygodium members, among other extirpated species, while the relatively North-South orientations of the Appalachian mountains and Japanese Alps allowed such southward migration.

== Uses ==
Lygodium species, known as nito, are used as a source of fibers in the Philippines. The fibers are used as material for weaving, most notably of traditional salakot headgear.

== As invasive species ==
Some Lygodium species are now considered very problematic invasive weeds in the southeastern United States. Populations of Lygodium have increased more than 12-fold over the past decade, as noted by Florida's Institute of Food and Agricultural Sciences.

Japanese climbing fern (Lygodium japonicum) was added to the Florida Noxious Weed List in 1999. It is also a major problem in pine plantations, causing contamination and harvesting problems for the pine straw industry. Old World climbing fern (Lygodium microphyllum) infests cypress swamps and other hydric sites, forming a monoculture. This massive infestation displaces all native flora and fauna, completely changing the ecosystem of the area.

Plants in this genus have basal chromosome counts of n=28, 29, 30.

== Phylogeny ==
Phylogeny of Lygodium

- - - section Volubilia
      - L. articulatum A.Rich. (Mangemange; Bushman's mattress)
      - - L. reticulatum Schkuhr
        - - L. microphyllum (Cav.) R. Br. (Old World climbing fern)
          - L. volubile Sw.
  - - section Palmata
      L. palmatum (Bernh.) Swartz (American climbing fern)
    - section Lygodium
      - - L. circinatum (Burm.fil.) Sw.
        - L. radiatum Prantl
      - - - - L. flexuosum (L.) Sw.
            - L. salicifolium Presl
          - - L. heterodoxum Kunze
            - L. merrillii Copel.
        - - - L. polystachyum Wall. ex Moore
            - - L. japonicum (Thunb.) Sw. (Japanese climbing fern)
              - L. venustum Sw.
          - - L. lanceolatum Desv.
            - - L. kerstenii Kuhn
              - - L. cubense Kunth
                - - L. oligostachyum (Willd.) Desv.
                  - L. smithianum Presl

Unassigned species:
- Lygodium altum (Clarke) Alderw.
- Lygodium auriculatum (Willd.) Alston
- Lygodium boivinii Kuhn
- Lygodium borneense Alderw.
- ?Lygodium conforme – China.
- ?Lygodium digitatum – China.
- Lygodium dimorphum Copel.
- Lygodium hians E.Fourn.
- Lygodium longifolium (Willd.) Sw.
- ?Lygodium microstachyum – China.
- ?Lygodium subareolatum – China.
- Lygodium trifurcatum Baker – Tropical southeast Asia south to northern Australasia.
- Lygodium versteeghii Christ – Tropical southeast Asia south to northern Australasia.
- Lygodium yunnanense Ching – Southern China.
- L. ×fayae Jermy & Walker
- L. ×lancetillanum Gómez
