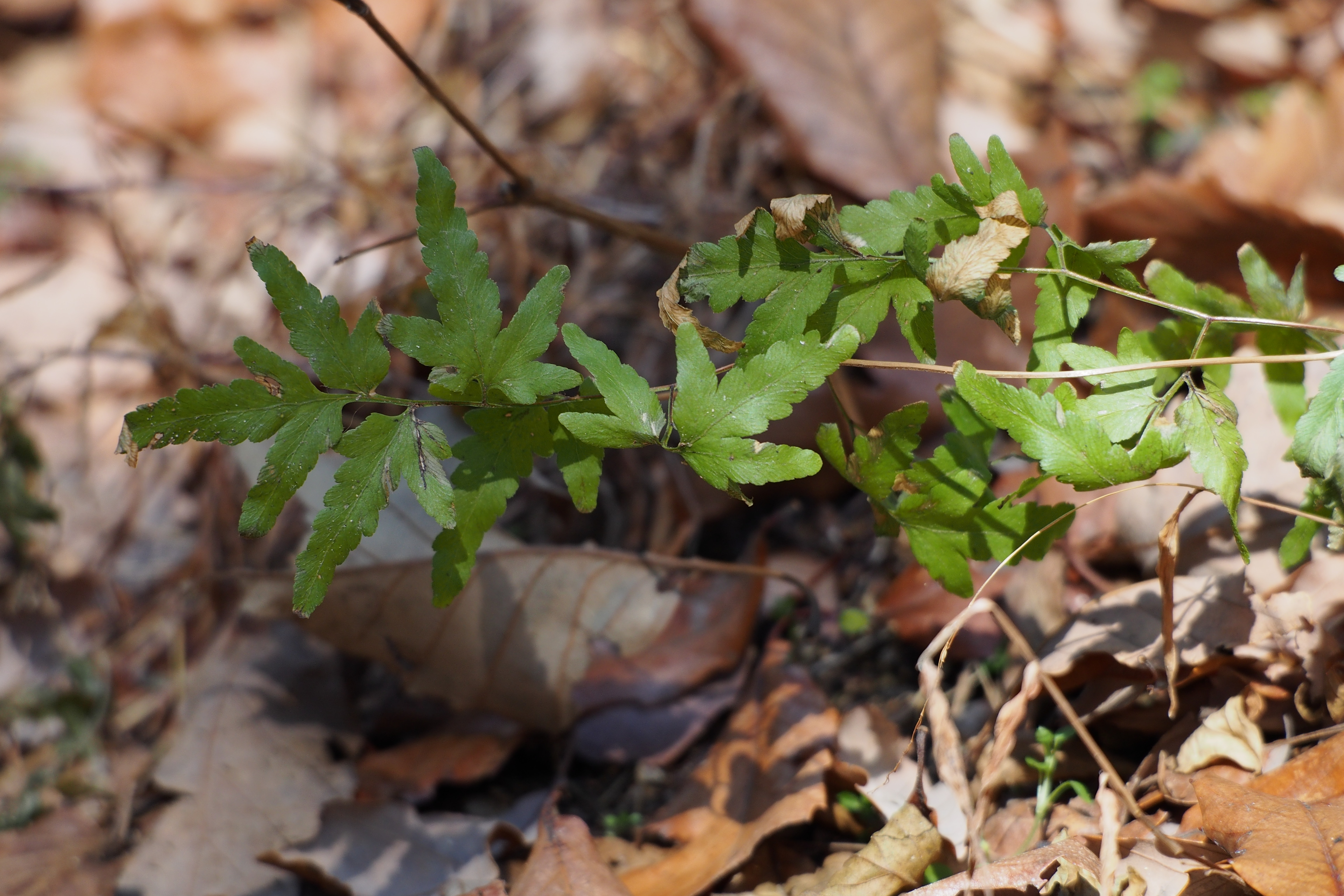
- Lygodium japonicum at Kobe, Japan

Scientific classification
- Kingdom: Plantae
- Clade: Tracheophytes
- Division: Polypodiophyta
- Class: Polypodiopsida
- Order: Schizaeales
- Family: Lygodiaceae
- Genus: Lygodium
- Species: L. japonicum

Binomial name
- Lygodium japonicum (Thunb.) Sw.

= Lygodium japonicum =

Species of fern

Lygodium japonicum is a species of fern that is known by the common names Japanese climbing fern and vine-like fern. It is native to eastern Asia, from Pakistan through India east to Taiwan, Japan, Korea, and south through southeastern Asia to New Guinea. The fern is present in the southeastern United States, Puerto Rico, South Africa, and Australia as an introduced species.

== Description ==
This fern produces a creeping stem from which grow very long leaves, the longest exceeding 30 metres (98 feet). The leaves have rachises, which are vine-like and may climb other vegetation. What appear to be individual leaves sprouting from the twining rachis are actually leaflets, which are smaller segments from the main leaf. There are two types of leaflets, sterile and fertile. The sterile frond has lance-shaped segments. The fertile frond has more intricately divided, fringed segments. It is lined with sporangia on the edges. The plant reproduces via spores and spreads vegetatively via underground rhizomes.

== Taxonomy ==
The specific epithet japonicum, refers to the Latin term for 'being from Japan'.

It was first published and described as Ophioglossum japonicum in the family Ophioglossaceae by Carl Peter Thunberg in Syst. Veg. edition 14 on page 926 in 1784, before Olof Swartz reclassified it as Lygodium japonicum in J. Bot. (edited by Schrader) on page 106 in 1802.

== Invasiveness ==
An introduced species in North America, Japanese climbing fern was first recorded as being established in Georgia in 1903. In the southeastern United States this plant is now considered an invasive weed of economic and ecological significance.

It grows in moist, swampy habitat, especially in disturbed areas. The presence of species such as the small-spike false nettle (Boehmeria cylindrica), royal fern (Osmunda spectabilis), resurrection fern (Pleopeltis polypodioides ssp. polypodioides), and toothed midsorus fern (Telmatoblechnum serrulatum) indicates the likely presence of this species. During controlled burns of wooded areas this fern may act as a "fuel ladder", which would allow the flames to climb into the canopy and destroy trees. After burns the fern can quickly grow back, so it cannot be controlled by fire.

In Europe, Lygodium japonicum has been included in the list of Invasive Alien Species of Union concern (the Union list) since 2019. This implies that this species cannot be imported, cultivated, transported, commercialized, planted, or intentionally released into the environment in the whole of the European Union.
