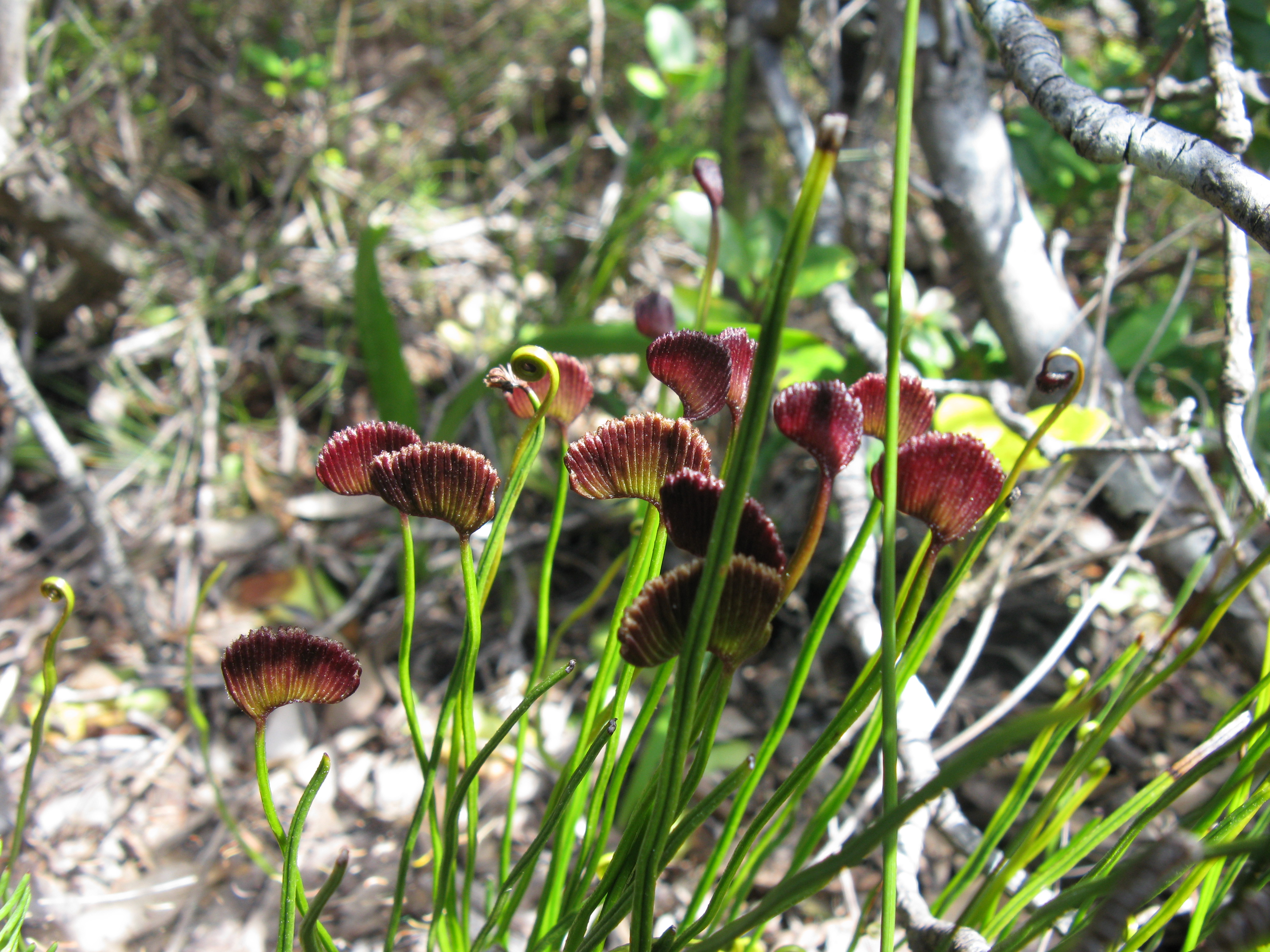
- Schizaea pectinata showing crozier, fertile fronds, and grass-like barren fronds

Scientific classification
- Kingdom: Plantae
- Clade: Tracheophytes
- Division: Polypodiophyta
- Class: Polypodiopsida
- Order: Schizaeales
- Family: Schizaeaceae
- Genus: Schizaea; Sm.

Type species
- Schizaea dichotoma (L.) Smith

Species
- See text

Synonyms
- Lophidium Richard 1792 nom. rej.; Microschizaea Reed 1948; Ripidium Bernhardi 1801 non Trinius 1822

= Schizaea =

Genus of ferns

Schizaea is a small genus of specialized ferns in the family Schizaeaceae. Common names include curlygrass fern and comb fern. Some species are very small and inconspicuous, and so may often be overlooked in nature. The genus is distinctive and not at all like the common conception of a fern, though it is still considered a true fern (leptosporangiate). The sterile fronds (trophophylls) are grass-like, and the spore-bearing fertile frond (sporophyll) is similar, but with a small, pinnate fertile segment at its apex. The upper surface of the pinnules bear the sessile capsules. Various of the roughly two dozen species have been reported from widely separated regions, including much of the tropical Old and New World, parts of the Eastern USA, Chile, the Falkland Islands, and various Pacific islands, including several islands of New Caledonia, as well as Australia and New Zealand. In Africa at least two species are endemic to South Africa.

== Phylogeny ==
Phylogeny of Schizaea

- - (Microschizaea)
    - S. tenella Kaulf.
    - - S. rupestris R. Br.
      - - S. fistulosa Labill. (Comb fern, narrow comb fern)
        - - S. australis Gaudich. (Southern comb fern)
          - S. robusta Baker 1868
  - (Schizaea)
    - S. pusilla Pursh (Curly grass fern)
    - - S. pectinata (L.) Sw.
      - - - S. poeppigiana Sturm
          - - S. sprucei Hook. ex Bak. & Hook.
            - - S. elegans (Vahl) Sw.
              - S. fluminensis Miers ex Sturm
        - - S. medusa Kuo et al. 2022
          - - - S. bifida Willd. (Forked comb fern)
              - S. dichotoma (L.) Sm. (Fan fern)
            - - S. incurvata Schkuhr
              - S. stricta Lellinger

Other species include:
- ?S. amazonica (Christ) Takeuchi
- ?S. boninensis (Nakai) H. Ohba
- S. hallieri (Richter) Reed
- ?S. kikuzatonis M.Ogata
- S. malaccana Bak.
- S. montis-petrae Brade
- ?S. pacificans Mart.
- S. pseudodichotoma Bierh.
- S. rhacoindusiata Bierh.
- S. ×diversispora Bierh.
