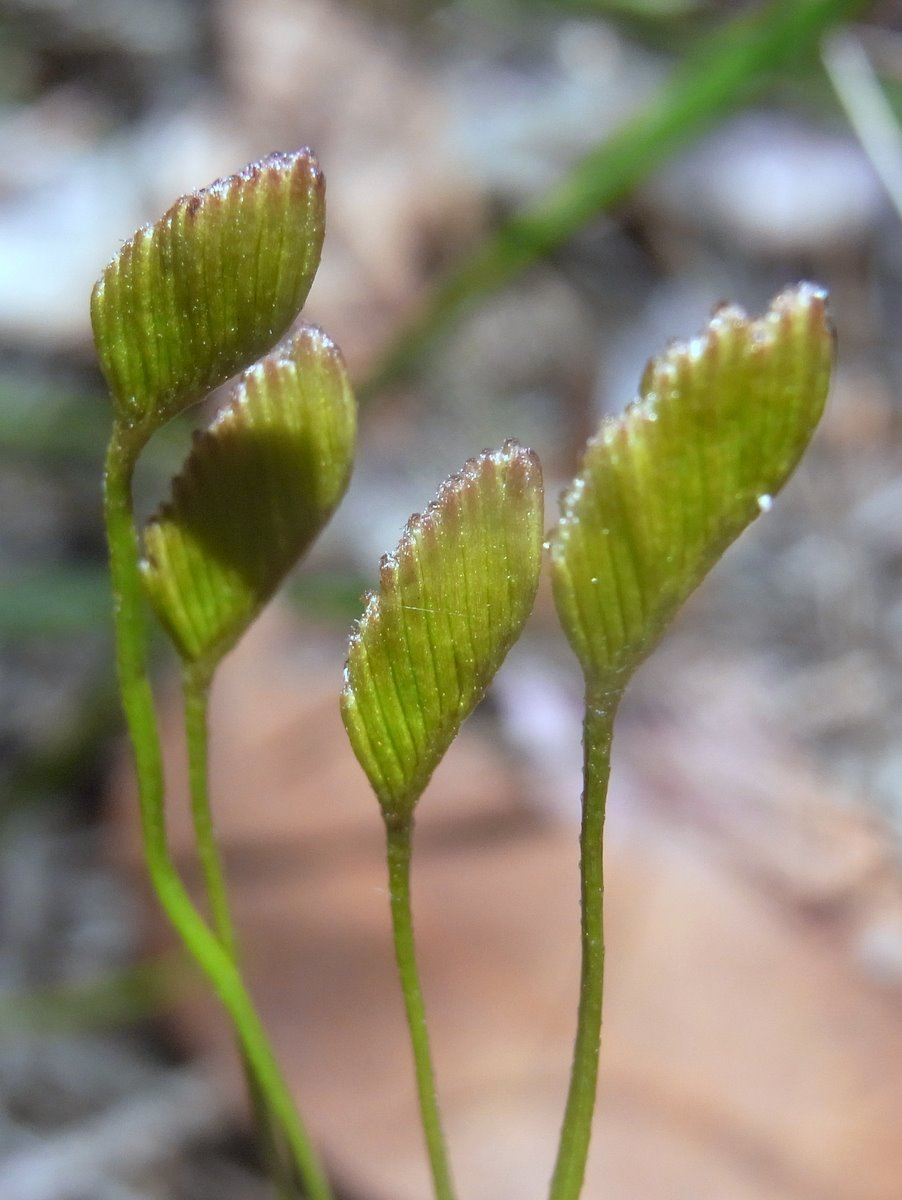
- Schizaea cf. bifida from Waratah Track, Ku-ring-gai Chase National Park, Australia

Scientific classification
- Kingdom: Plantae
- Clade: Tracheophytes
- Division: Polypodiophyta
- Class: Polypodiopsida
- Order: Schizaeales
- Family: Schizaeaceae; Kaulf.

Genera
- See text

= Schizaeaceae =

Family of ferns

Schizaeaceae is a family of ferns in the order Schizaeales. In the Pteridophyte Phylogeny Group classification of 2016 (PPG I), it includes only two genera. Alternatively, two families kept separate in PPG I, Lygodiaceae and Anemiaceae, may be included in Schizaeaceae (as the subfamilies Lygodioideae and Anemioideae) so that the family has four genera. In this approach, the Schizaeaceae of PPG I is treated as the subfamily Schizaeoideae.

== Distribution ==
Species are mainly distributed in the tropics, but several are found in temperate regions in North America, South Africa, Australasia and Northeast Asia.

== Description ==
The sporangia are borne on specialised pinnae, distinct from ordinary vegetative pinnae. The pinnae form small comb-like, pinnate structures on which the sporangia are formed.

== Genera ==
In the narrow circumscription of the family, there are two genera:

- Actinostachys Wall
- Schizaea Sm.

Two further genera are included in the broader circumscription:

- Anemia Sm. – otherwise placed in the monotypic family Anemiaceae
- Lygodium Sw. – otherwise placed in the monotypic family Lygodiaceae

== Extinct Genera ==
- Ruffordia
