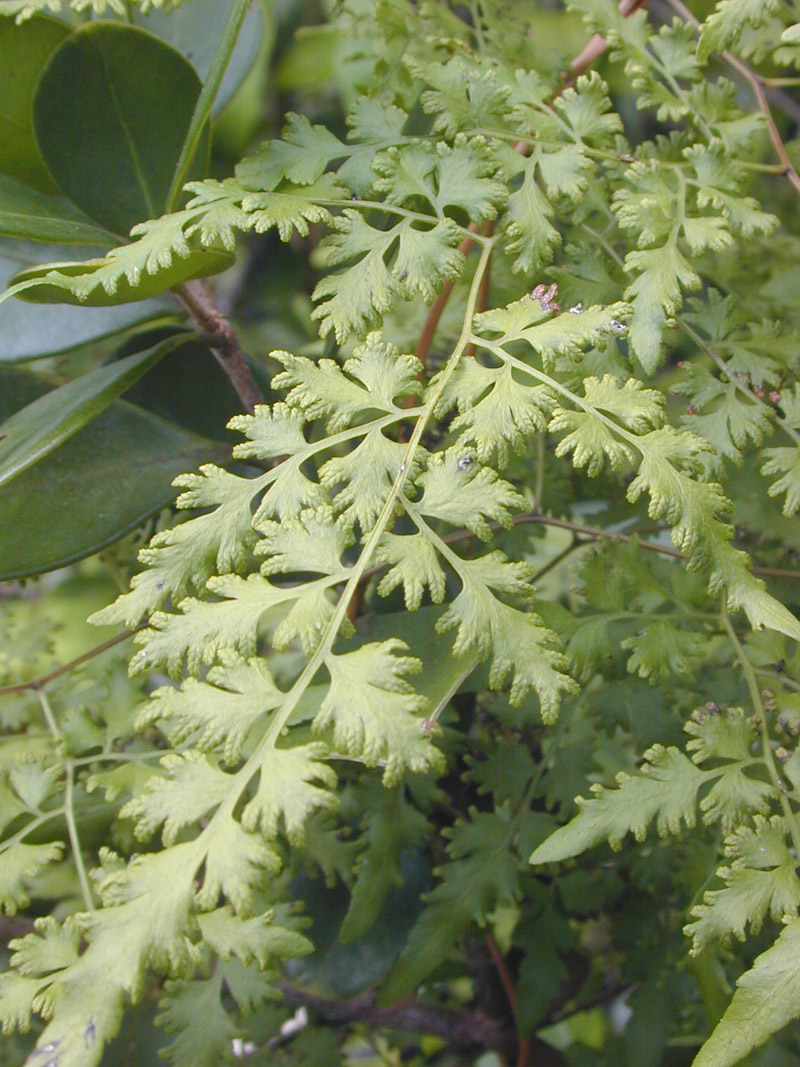
- Lygodium japonicum

Scientific classification
- Kingdom: Plantae
- Clade: Tracheophytes
- Division: Polypodiophyta
- Class: Polypodiopsida
- Subclass: Polypodiidae
- Order: Schizaeales; Schimp.

Families
- Schizaeaceae; Anemiaceae; Lygodiaceae

= Schizaeales =

Schizaeales Temporal range: Late Carboniferous to Recent (Pennsylvanian-Holocene), 303.7–0 Ma

Order of ferns

Schizaeales is an order of ferns (class Polypodiopsida).

== Description ==
Phylogeny of Schizaeaceae

- - - Lygodiaceae
      Lygodium
  - - Anemiaceae
      Anemia
    - Schizaeaceae
      - Actinostachys
      - Schizaea

While the three clades of Schizaeales are all well-distinguished from one another by numerous morphological characters, members of the order all have dimorphic fertile and sterile fronds and lack well-defined sori. Their sporangia have a horizontal annulus that lies below and completely encircles the top of the sporangium. The two genera Actinostachys and Schizaea (except for Microschizaea) in the family Schizaeaceae have subterranean gametophytes without chlorophyll.

== Classification ==
In the molecular phylogenetic classification of Smith et al. in 2006, the Schizaeales were placed in the leptosporangiate ferns, class Polypodiopsida. Three families, Anemiaceae, Lygodiaceae, and Schizaeaceae were recognized. The linear sequence of Christenhusz et al. (2011), intended for compatibility with the classification of Chase and Reveal (2009) which placed all land plants in Equisetopsida, reclassified Smith's Polypodiopsida as subclass Polypodiidae and placed the Schizaeales there, with the same three families. The classification of Christenhusz and Chase (2014) placed all members of the Schizaeales in a more broadly defined Schizaeaceae, reducing the three existing families to subfamilies as Anemioideae, Lygodioideae, and Schizaeoideae. The PPG I classification (2016) returned to the three-family definition of the order.

Historically, the ferns in this order were once all lumped into the family Schizaeaceae in the old order Filicales. However, although they are demonstrably related, these ferns differ markedly, and so three groups have now been elevated to family status:

- The family Schizaeaceae are generally small ferns with forking fronds and a distinctive, somewhat non-fern-like, appearance.
- The family Anemiaceae look very fern-like and are typically terrestrial or epipetric.
- The family Lygodiaceae, or climbing ferns, look very ferny but are highly distinctive in their growth habit: the rachis of the frond is long and flexible, with indeterminate growth, so that the fronds form climbing or trailing vines.

At one time some workers believed the water ferns (order Salviniales) to be allied to this order because of certain structural similarities, but modern cladistic studies have ruled out any special alliance.

== Evolution ==
Schizaeales had a northern hemisphere concentration as late as the Mesozoic, but by the Quaternary, there was a clear shift to a southern hemisphere distribution.
