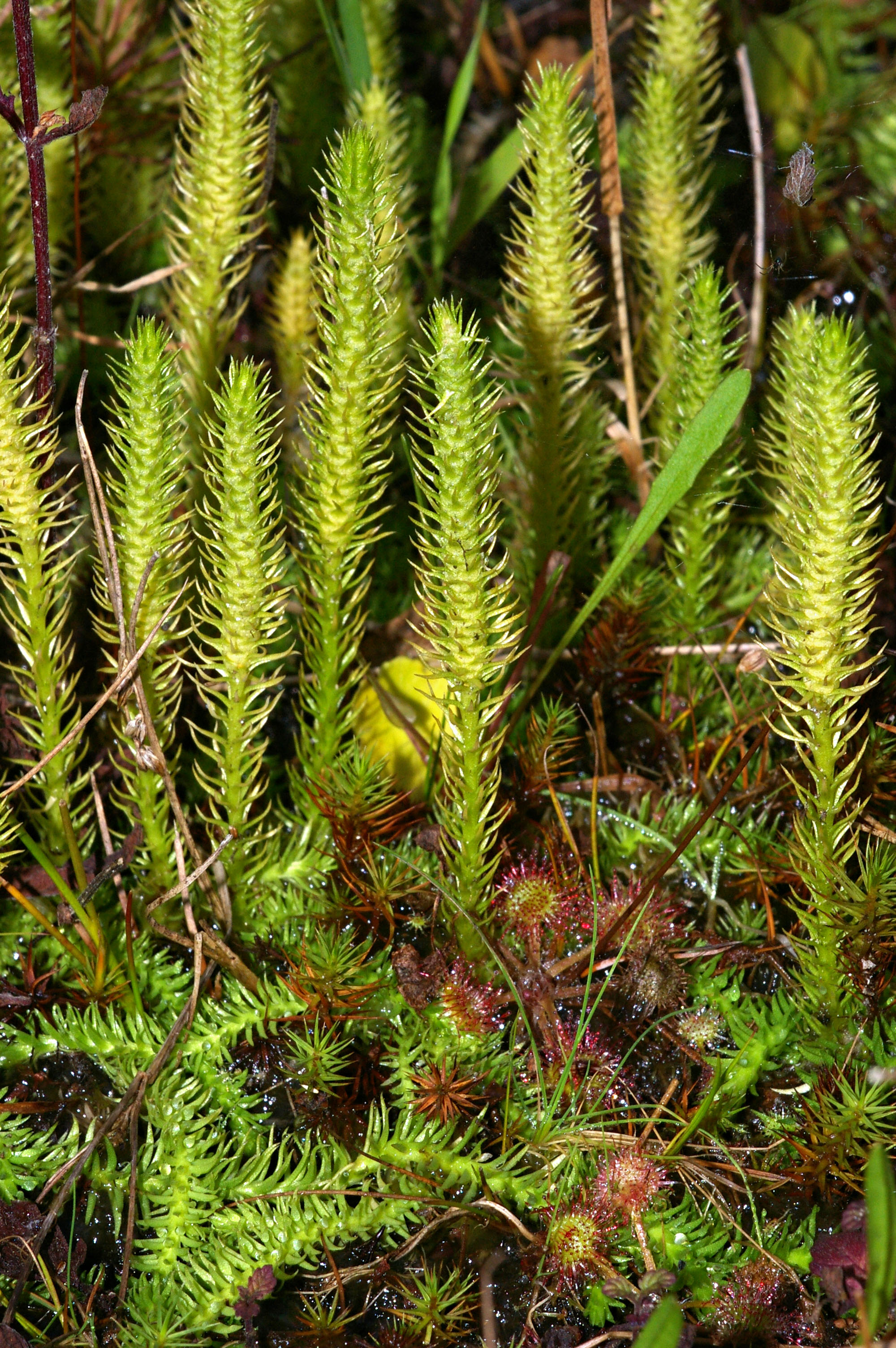
- Marsh Clubmoss Lycopodiella inundata

Scientific classification
- Kingdom: Plantae
- Clade: Tracheophytes
- Division: Pteridophyta

Groups included
- Lycopodiophyta; Polypodiophyta

Cladistically included but traditionally excluded taxa
- Spermatophyta

= Pteridophyte =

Group of vascular plants that reproduce by spores

A pteridophyte is a vascular plant with xylem and phloem that reproduces by means of spores. Because pteridophytes produce neither flowers nor seeds, they are sometimes referred to as "cryptogams", meaning that their means of reproduction is hidden.

Ferns, horsetails (often treated as ferns), and lycophytes (clubmosses, spikemosses, and quillworts) are all pteridophytes. However, they do not form a monophyletic group because ferns (and horsetails) are more closely related to seed plants than to lycophytes. "Pteridophyta" is thus no longer a widely accepted taxon, but the term pteridophyte remains in common parlance, as do pteridology and pteridologist as a science and its practitioner, for example by the International Association of Pteridologists and the Pteridophyte Phylogeny Group.

== Description ==
Pteridophytes (ferns and lycophytes) are free-sporing vascular plants that have a life cycle with alternating, free-living gametophyte and sporophyte phases that are independent at maturity. The body of the sporophyte is well differentiated into roots, stem and leaves. The root system is always adventitious. The stem is either underground or aerial. The leaves may be microphylls or megaphylls. Their other common characteristics include vascular plant apomorphies (e.g., vascular tissue) and land plant plesiomorphies (e.g., spore dispersal and the absence of seeds).

== Taxonomy ==
=== Phylogeny ===
Of the pteridophytes, ferns account for nearly 90% of the extant diversity. Smith et al. (2006), the first higher-level pteridophyte classification published in the molecular phylogenetic era, considered the ferns as monilophytes, as follows:

- Division Tracheophyta (tracheophytes) - vascular plants
  - Subdivision Lycopodiophyta (lycophytes) - less than 1% of extant vascular plants
  - Sub division Euphyllophytina (euphyllophytes)
    - Infradivision Moniliformopses (monilophytes)
    - Infradivision Spermatophyta - seed plants, ~260,000 species

where the monilophytes comprise about 9,000 species, including horsetails (Equisetaceae), whisk ferns (Psilotaceae), and all eusporangiate and all leptosporangiate ferns. Historically both lycophytes and monilophytes were grouped together as pteridophytes (ferns and fern allies) on the basis of being spore-bearing ("seed-free"). In Smith's molecular phylogenetic study the ferns are characterised by lateral root origin in the endodermis, usually mesarch protoxylem in shoots, a pseudoendospore, plasmodial tapetum, and sperm cells with 30-1000 flagella. The term "moniliform" as in Moniliformopses and monilophytes means "bead-shaped" and was introduced by Kenrick and Crane (1997) as a scientific replacement for "fern" (including Equisetaceae) and became established by Pryer et al. (2004). Christenhusz and Chase (2014) in their review of classification schemes provide a critique of this usage, which they discouraged as irrational. In fact the alternative name Filicopsida was already in use. By comparison "lycopod" or lycophyte (club moss) means wolf-plant. The term "fern ally" included under Pteridophyta generally refers to vascular spore-bearing plants that are not ferns, including lycopods, horsetails, whisk ferns and water ferns (Marsileaceae, Salviniaceae and Ceratopteris). This is not a natural grouping but rather a convenient term for non-fern, and is also discouraged, as is eusporangiate for non-leptosporangiate ferns.

However both Infradivision and Moniliformopses are also invalid names under the International Code of Botanical Nomenclature. Ferns, despite forming a monophyletic clade, are formally only considered as four classes (Psilotopsida; Equisetopsida; Marattiopsida; Polypodiopsida), 11 orders and 37 families, without assigning a higher taxonomic rank.

Furthermore, within the Polypodiopsida, the largest grouping, a number of informal clades were recognised, including leptosporangiates, core leptosporangiates, polypods (Polypodiales), and eupolypods (including Eupolypods I and Eupolypods II).

In 2014 Christenhusz and Chase, summarising the known knowledge at that time, treated this group as two separate unrelated taxa in a consensus classification;

- Lycopodiophyta (lycopods) 1 subclass, 3 orders, each with one family, 5 genera, approx. 1,300 species
- Polypodiophyta (ferns) 4 subclasses, 11 orders, 21 families, approx. 212 genera, approx. 10,535 species
  - Subclass Equisetidae Warm.
  - Subclass Ophioglossidae Klinge
  - Subclass Marattiidae Klinge
  - Subclass Polypodiidae Cronquist, Takht. & Zimmerm.

These subclasses correspond to Smith's four classes, with Ophioglossidae corresponding to Psilotopsida.

The two major groups previously included in Pteridophyta are phylogenetically related as follows:

- Tracheophyta – vascular plants
  - Lycopodiophyta
  - Euphyllophyta
    - Polypodiophyta – ferns
    - Spermatophyta – seed plants
      - †Pteridospermatophyta
      - Gymnospermae
      - Angiospermae – flowering plants

=== Subdivision ===
Pteridophytes consist of two separate but related classes, whose nomenclature has varied. The system put forward by the Pteridophyte Phylogeny Group in 2016, PPG I, is:

- Class Lycopodiopsida Bartl. – lycophytes: clubmosses, quillworts and spikemosses; 3 extant orders

- Order Lycopodiales DC. ex Bercht. & J.Presl – clubmosses; 1 extant family
- Order Isoetales Prantl – quillworts; 1 extant family
- Order Selaginellales Prantl – spikemosses; 1 extant family

- Class Polypodiopsida Cronquist, Takht. & W.Zimm. – ferns; 11 extant orders
  - Subclass Equisetidae Warm. – horsetails; 1 extant order, family and genus (Equisetum)
    - Order Equisetales DC. ex Bercht. & J.Presl – 1 extant family
  - Subclass Ophioglossidae Klinge – 2 extant orders
    - Order Psilotales Prant – whisk ferns; 1 extant family
    - Order Ophioglossales Link – grape ferns; 1 extant family
  - Subclass Marattiidae Klinge – marattioid ferns; 1 extant order
    - Order Marattiales Link – 1 extant family
  - Subclass Polypodiidae Cronquist, Takht. & W.Zimm. – leptosporangiate ferns; 7 extant orders
    - Order Osmundales Link – 1 extant family
    - Order Hymenophyllales A.B.Frank – 1 extant family
    - Order Gleicheniales Schimp – 3 extant families
    - Order Schizaeales Schimp. – 3 extant families
    - Order Salviniales Link – 2 extant families
    - Order Cyatheales A.B.Frank – 8 extant families
    - Order Polypodiales Link – 26 extant families

In addition to these living groups, several groups of pteridophytes are now extinct and known only from fossils. These groups include the Rhyniopsida, Zosterophyllopsida, Trimerophytopsida, the Lepidodendrales and the Progymnospermopsida.

Modern studies of the land plants agree that seed plants emerged from pteridophytes closer to ferns than lycophytes. Therefore, pteridophytes do not form a clade but constitute a paraphyletic grade.

=== Etymology ===
The name Pteridophyte is a Neo-Latin compound word created by English speakers around 1880. It is formed from the prefix pterido- meaning fern, a Latin borrowing of the Greek word pterís which derives from pterón meaning feather. The suffix, -phyte, is a suffix meaning plant from the ancient Greek word phyton (φυτόν).

== Life cycle ==
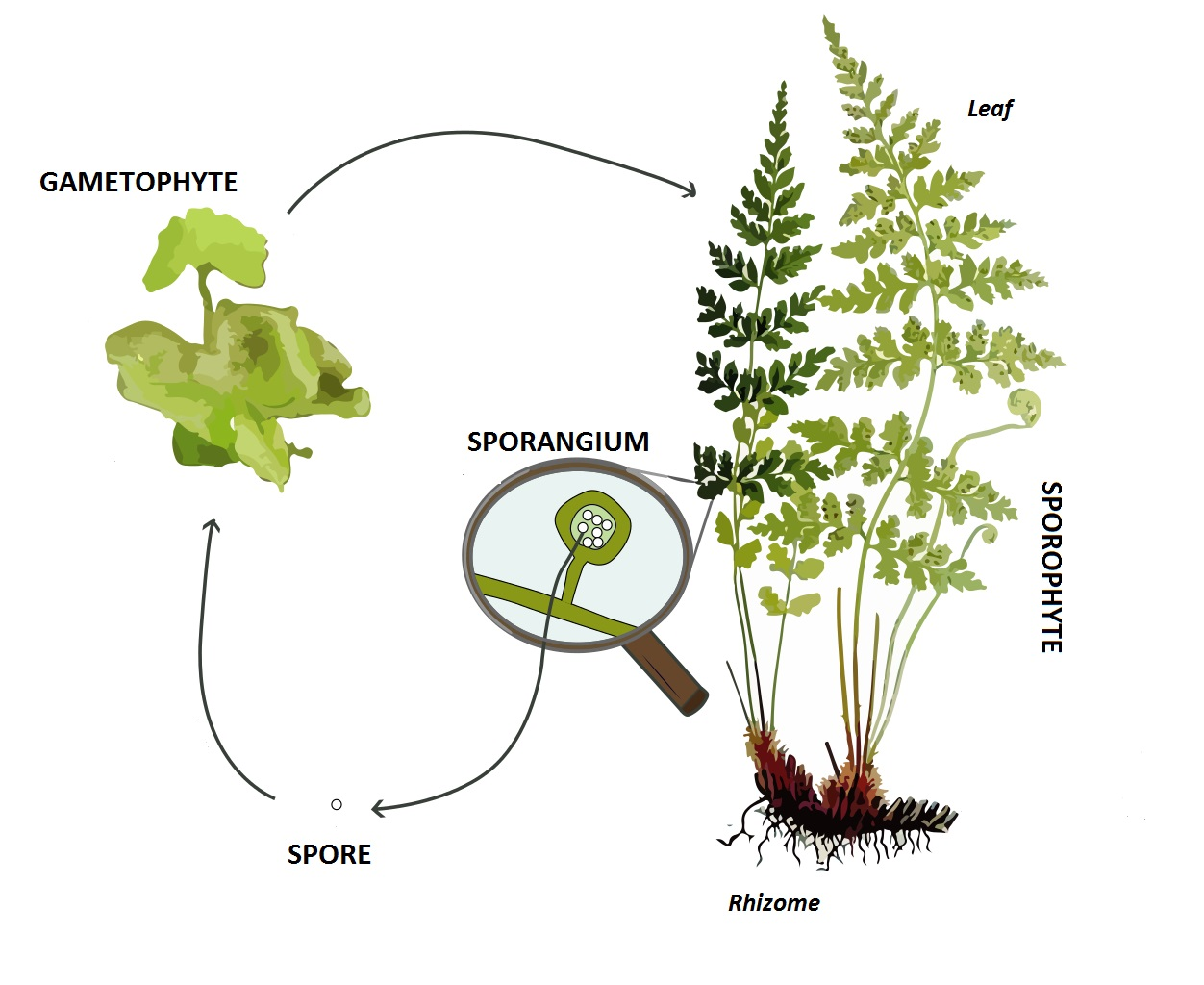
Pteridophyte life cycle

Just as with bryophytes and spermatophytes (seed plants), the life cycle of pteridophytes involves alternation of generations. This means that a diploid generation (the sporophyte, which produces spores) is followed by a haploid generation (the gametophyte or prothallus, which produces gametes). Pteridophytes differ from bryophytes in that the sporophyte is branched and generally much larger and more conspicuous, and from seed plants in that both generations are independent and free-living. The sexuality of pteridophyte gametophytes can be classified as follows:

- Dioicous: each individual gametophyte is either male (producing antheridia and hence sperm) or female (producing archegonia and hence egg cells).
- Monoicous: each individual gametophyte produces both antheridia and archegonia and can function both as a male and as a female.
  Protandrous: the antheridia mature before the archegonia (male first, then female).
  Protogynous: the archegonia mature before the antheridia (female first, then male).

These terms are not the same as monoecious and dioecious, which refer to whether a seed plant's sporophyte bears both male and female gametophytes, i.e., produces both pollen and seeds, or just one.

== See also ==
- Embryophyte
- Fern ally
- Plant sexuality

== Bibliography ==
- Cantino, Philip D.; Doyle, James A.; Graham, Sean W.; Judd, Walter S.; Olmstead, Richard G.; Soltis, Douglas E.; Soltis, Pamela S.; Donoghue, Michael J. (1 August 2007). "Towards a Phylogenetic Nomenclature of Tracheophyta". Taxon. 56 (3): 822. doi:10.2307/25065865. JSTOR 25065865.
- Christenhusz, M. J. M.; Zhang, X. C.; Schneider, H. (18 February 2011). "A linear sequence of extant families and genera of lycophytes and ferns" (PDF). Phytotaxa. 19 (1): 7. Bibcode:2011Phytx..19....7C. doi:10.11646/phytotaxa.19.1.2.
- Christenhusz, Maarten J.M. & Chase, Mark W. (2014). "Trends and concepts in fern classification". Annals of Botany. 113 (9): 571–594. doi:10.1093/aob/mct299. PMC 3936591. PMID 24532607.
- Clark, James; Hidalgo, Oriane; Pellicer, Jaume; Liu, Hongmei; Marquardt, Jeannine; Robert, Yannis; Christenhusz, Maarten; Zhang, Shouzhou; Gibby, Mary; Leitch, Ilia J.; Schneider, Harald (May 2016). "Genome evolution of ferns: evidence for relative stasis of genome size across the fern phylogeny". New Phytologist. 210 (3): 1072–1082. Bibcode:2016NewPh.210.1072C. doi:10.1111/nph.13833. hdl:10261/345876. PMID 26756823.
- Chase, Mark W. & Reveal, James L. (2009). "A phylogenetic classification of the land plants to accompany APG III". Botanical Journal of the Linnean Society. 161 (2): 122–127. doi:10.1111/j.1095-8339.2009.01002.x.
- Gifford, Ernest M.; Foster, Adriance S. (1996). Morphology and evolution of vascular plants (3rd ed.). New York: Freeman. ISBN 0-7167-1946-0.
- Kenrick, Paul; Crane, Peter (1996). "Embryophytes: Land plants". Tree of Life Web Project.
- Kenrick, Paul; Crane, Peter R. (4 September 1997). "The origin and early evolution of plants on land" (PDF). Nature. 389 (6646): 33–39. Bibcode:1997Natur.389...33K. doi:10.1038/37918. S2CID 3866183.
- Kenrick, Paul; Crane, Peter (1997). The Origin and Early Diversification of Land Plants: A Cladistic Study. Washington, D.C.: Smithsonian Institution Press. ISBN 9781560987291.
- Pryer, K. M.; Schuettpelz, E.; Wolf, P. G.; Schneider, H.; Smith, A. R.; Cranfill, R. (1 October 2004). "Phylogeny and evolution of ferns (monilophytes) with a focus on the early leptosporangiate divergences". American Journal of Botany. 91 (10): 1582–1598. Bibcode:2004AmJB...91.1582P. doi:10.3732/ajb.91.10.1582. PMID 21652310.
- Pteridophyte Phylogeny Group (November 2016). "A community-derived classification for extant lycophytes and ferns". Journal of Systematics and Evolution. 54 (6): 563–603. Bibcode:2016JSyEv..54..563.. doi:10.1111/jse.12229. S2CID 39980610.
- Ranker, Tom A.; Haufler, Christopher H. (2008). Biology and Evolution of Ferns and Lycophytes. Cambridge University Press. ISBN 978-0-521-87411-3.
- Raven, Peter H.; Evert, Ray F.; Eichhorn, Susan E. (2005). Biology of plants (7th ed.). New York, NY: Freeman and Company. ISBN 0-7167-1007-2.
- Schneider, Harald; Schuettpelz, Eric (November 2016). "Systematics and evolution of lycophytes and ferns". Journal of Systematics and Evolution. 54 (6): 561–562. Bibcode:2016JSyEv..54..561S. doi:10.1111/jse.12231. S2CID 90542414.
- Smith, Alan R.; Kathleen M. Pryer; Eric Schuettpelz; Petra Korall; Harald Schneider; Paul G. Wolf (2006). "A classification for extant ferns" (PDF). Taxon. 55 (3): 705–731. Bibcode:2006Taxon..55..705S. doi:10.2307/25065646. JSTOR 25065646.
- Walkowiak, Radoslaw Janusz (2017). "Classification of Pteridophytes - Short classification of the ferns" (PDF). IEA Paper. doi:10.13140/RG.2.2.29934.20809.
