= Dehiscence (botany) =

Splitting of a plant structure to release contents

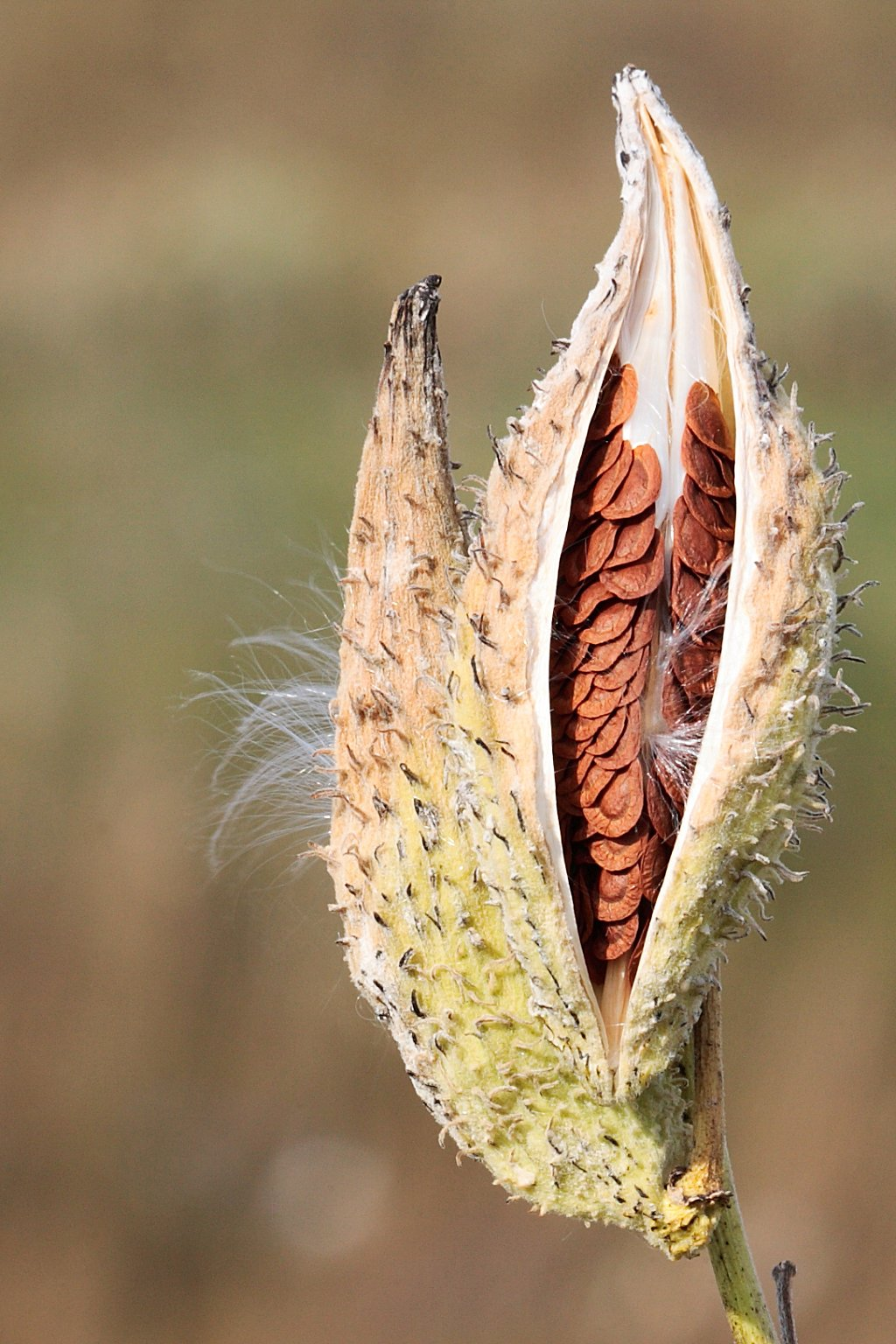
Dehiscence of the follicular fruit of milkweed (Asclepias syriaca) revealing seeds within

Dehiscence is the splitting of a mature plant structure along a built-in line of weakness to release its contents. This is common among fruits, anthers and sporangia. Sometimes this involves the complete detachment of a part. Structures that open in this way are said to be dehiscent. Structures that do not open in this way are called indehiscent, and rely on other mechanisms such as decay, digestion by herbivores, or predation to release the contents.

A similar process to dehiscence occurs in some flower buds (e.g., Platycodon, Fuchsia), but this is rarely referred to as dehiscence unless circumscissile dehiscence is involved; anthesis is the usual term for the opening of flowers. Dehiscence may or may not involve the loss of a structure through the process of abscission. The lost structures are said to be caducous.

== Association with crop breeding ==
Manipulation of dehiscence can improve crop yield since a trait that causes seed dispersal is a disadvantage for farmers, whose goal is to collect the seed. Many agronomically important plants have been bred for reduced shattering.

== Mechanisms ==
=== Explosive dehiscence ===
Explosive dehiscence is a ballistic form of dispersal that flings seeds or spores far from the parent plant. This rapid plant movement can achieve limited dispersal without the assistance of animals. A notable example is the sandbox tree (Hura crepitans), which can fling seeds 100 meters (300 ft) and has been called the "boomer plant" due to the loud sound it generates. Another example is Impatiens, whose explosive dehiscence is triggered by being touched, leading it to be called the "touch-me-not". Ecballium elaterium, the "squirting cucumber", uses explosive dehiscence to disperse its seeds, ejecting them from matured fruit in a stream of mucilaginous liquid. Explosive dehiscence of sporangia is a characteristic of Sphagnum.

=== Septicidal and loculicidal dehiscence ===
In loculicidal dehiscence, the locule wall splits between the septa, leaving the latter intact, while in septicidal dehiscence the split is at the septum that separates the loculi. Septicidal and loculicidal dehiscence may not be completely distinct; in some cases both the septa and the walls of the locules split.

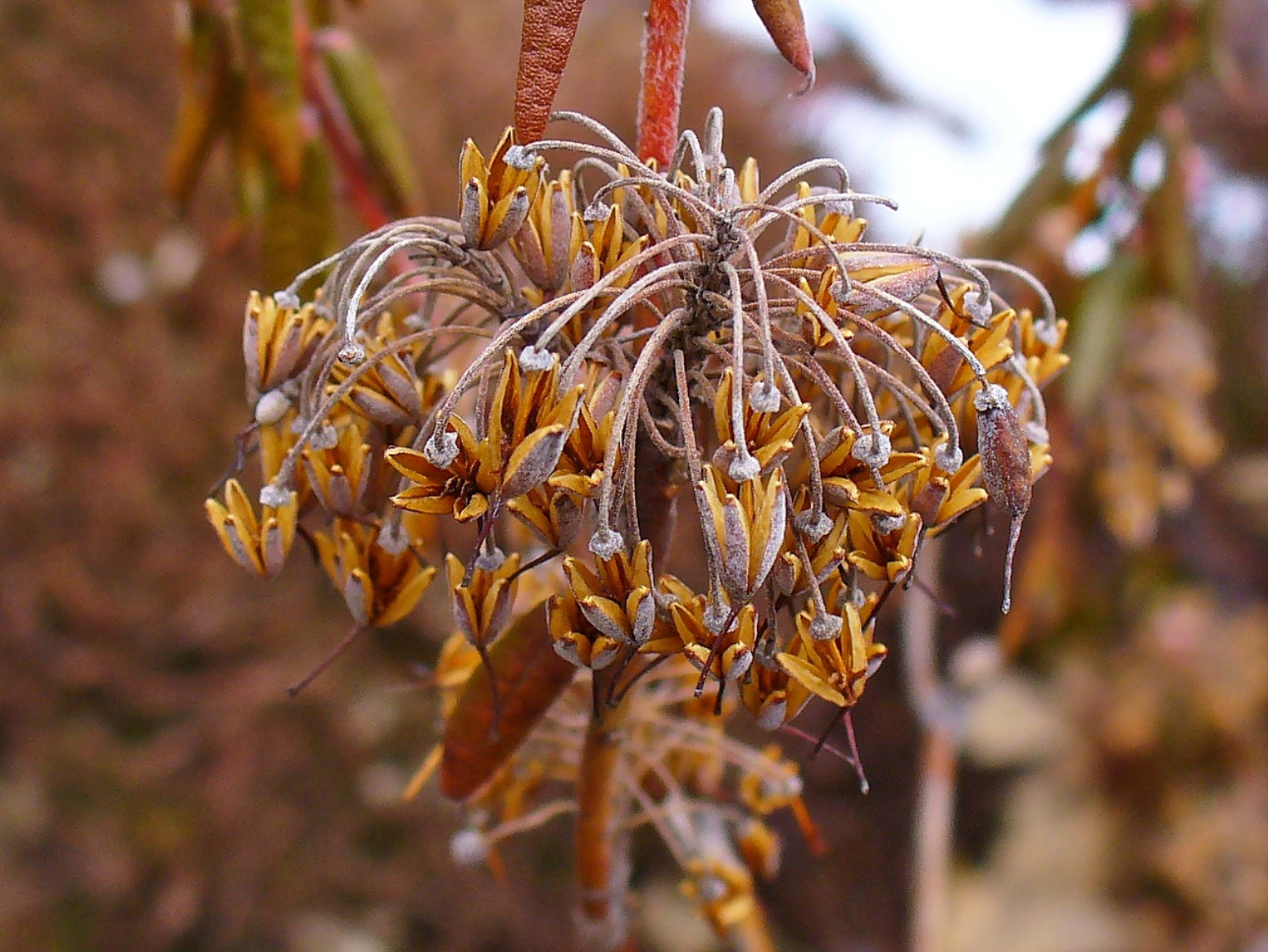
Septicidal dehiscence. The septa between the locules of Ledum palustre capsules split as the fruit opens, and the seeds are released.

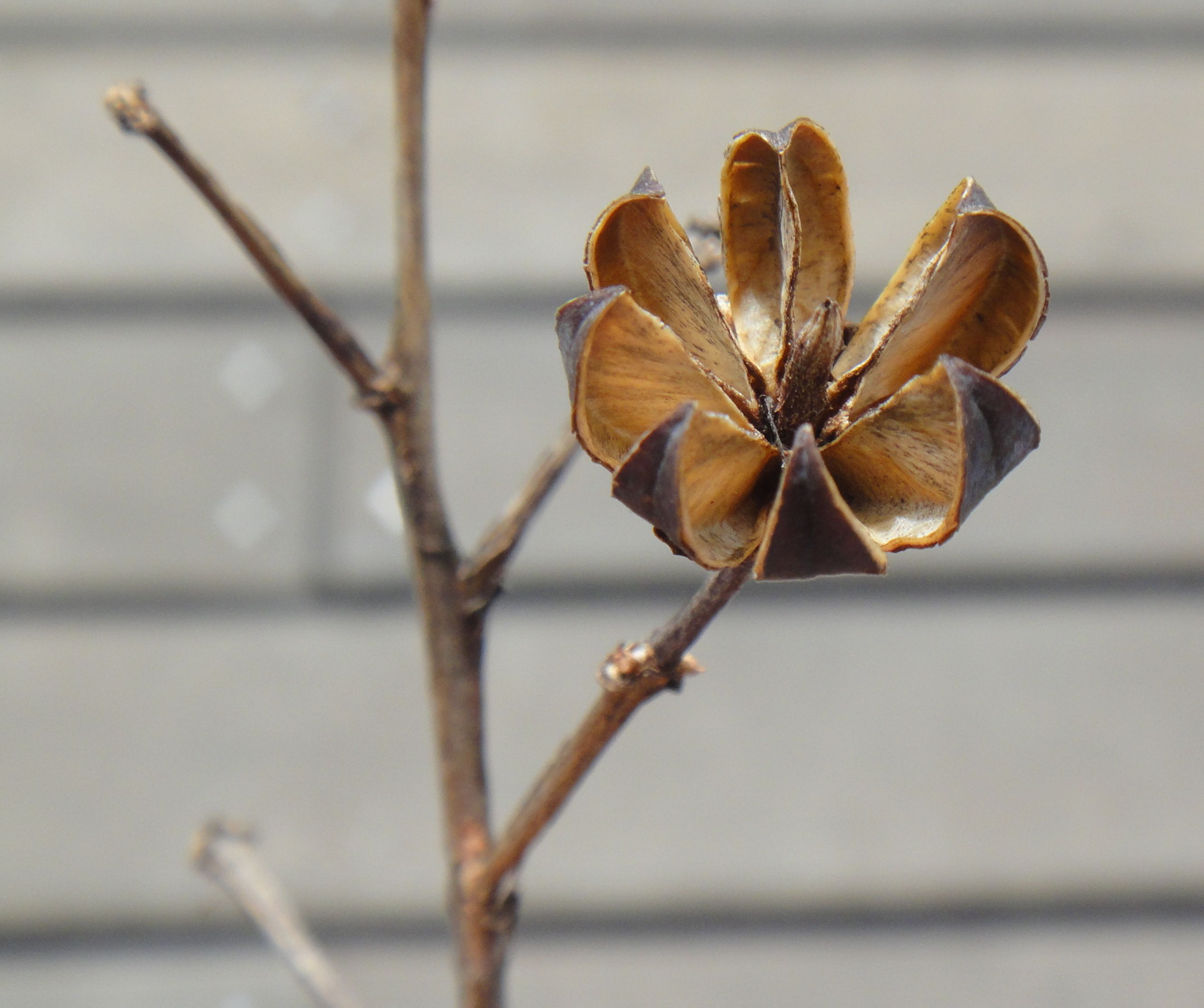
Loculicidal dehiscence. The locules of Lagerstroemia capsules split as the fruit opens, and the septa remain intact.

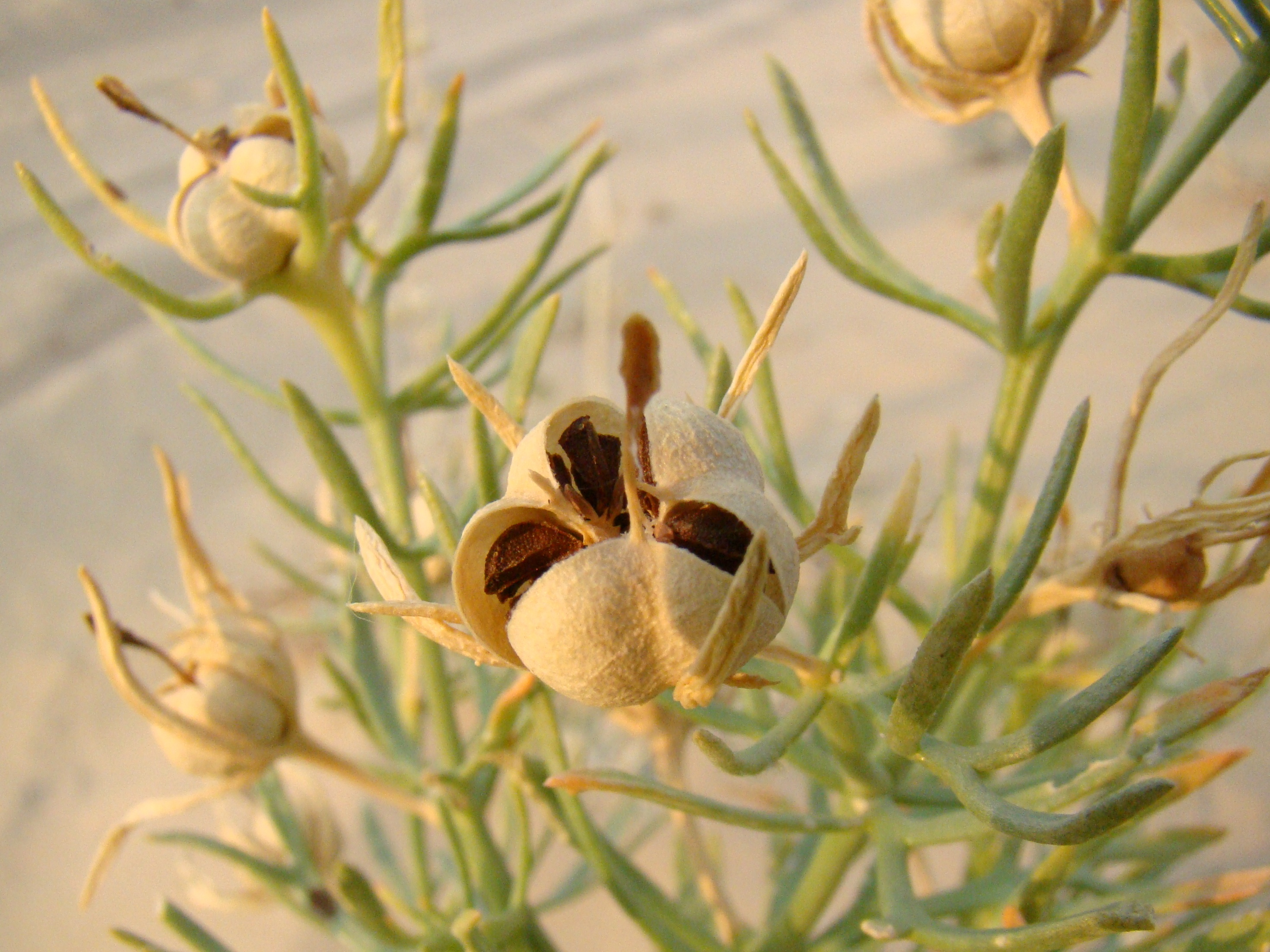
Loculicidal dehiscence in Peganum harmala

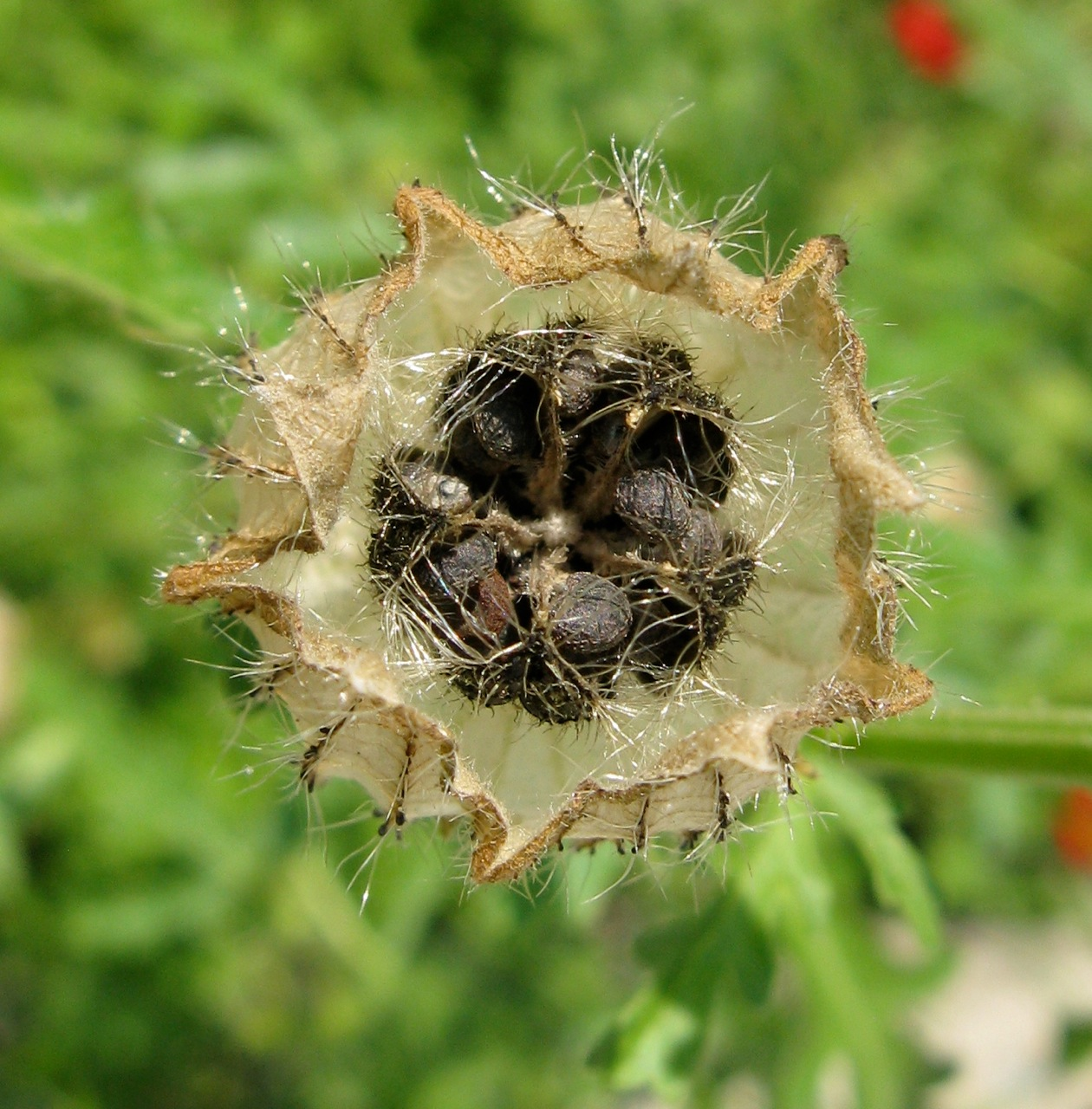
A complex form of dehiscence. The calyx of Hibiscus trionum has opened apically to reveal the capsule (ovary) inside. The capsule has split vertically in the centre, as well as through the locule walls.

== Types ==
Dehiscence occurs through breakage of various parts of the enclosing structure; the mechanisms can be classified in various ways, but intermediate forms also occur.

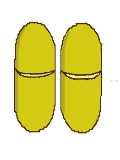
Transverse dehiscence of a pair of anthers

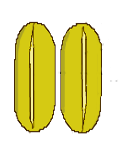
Longitudinal dehiscence of a pair of anthers

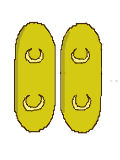
Valvular dehiscence of a pair of anthers

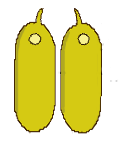
Poricidal dehiscence of a pair of anthers

=== Poricidal dehiscence ===
Dehiscence through a small hole (pore) is referred to as poricidal dehiscence. The pore may have a cover (operculate poricidal dehiscence or operculate dehiscence) that is referred to as an operculum or it may not (inoperculate poricidal dehiscence or inoperculate dehiscence).

Poricidal dehiscence occurs in many unrelated organisms, in fruit, causing the release of seeds, and also in the sporangia of many organisms (flowering plants, ferns, fungi, slime molds). Poricidal anthers of various flowers are associated with buzz pollination by insects.

=== Circumscissile dehiscence ===
Circumscissile dehiscence involves a horizontal opening that causes a lid to separate completely. This type of dehiscence occurs in some fruit and anthers and also in some flower buds.

== Anther dehiscence ==
Anther dehiscence is the final function of the anther that causes the release of pollen grains. This process is coordinated precisely with pollen differentiation, floral development, and flower opening.

The anther wall breaks at a specific site. Usually this site is observed as an indentation between the locules of each theca and runs the length of the anther, but in species with poricidal anther dehiscence it is instead a small pore. If the pollen is released from the anther through a split on the outer side (relative to the center of the flower), this is extrorse dehiscence, and if the pollen is released from the inner side, this is introrse dehiscence. If the pollen is released through a split that is positioned to the side, towards other anthers, rather than towards the inside or outside of the flower, this is latrorse dehiscence.

The stomium is the region of the anther where dehiscence occurs. The degeneration of the stomium and septum cells is part of a developmentally timed cell-death program. Expansion of the endothecial layer and subsequent drying are also required for dehiscence. The endothecium tissue is responsible for the tensions that lead to splitting of the anther. This tissue is usually one to several layers thick, with cells walls of uneven thickness due to uneven lignification. The cells lose water, and the uneven thickness causes the thinner walls of the cells to stretch to a greater extent. This creates a tension that eventually leads to the anther being split along its line of weakness and releasing pollen grains to the atmosphere.

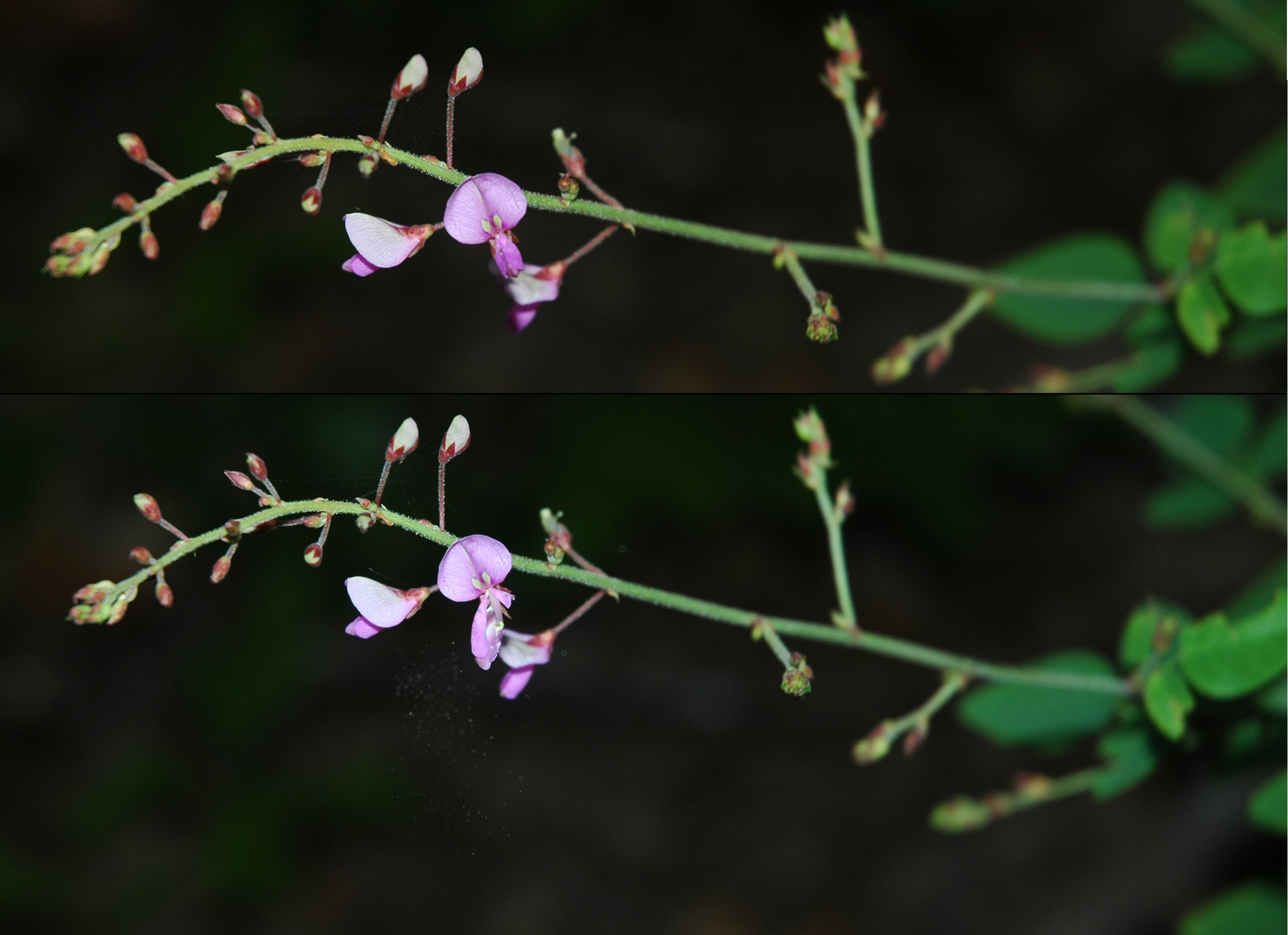
Before/During images of anther dehiscence in the common Milk Pea

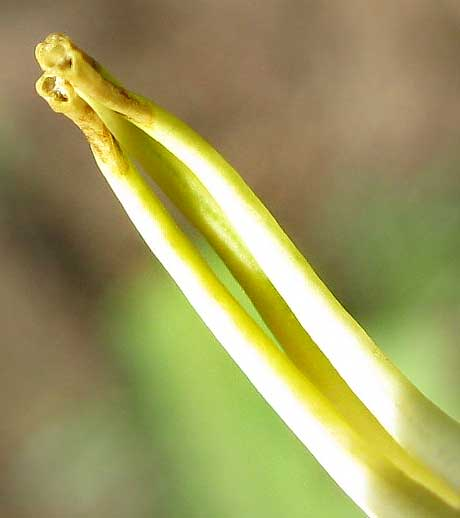
Poricidal anther dehiscence

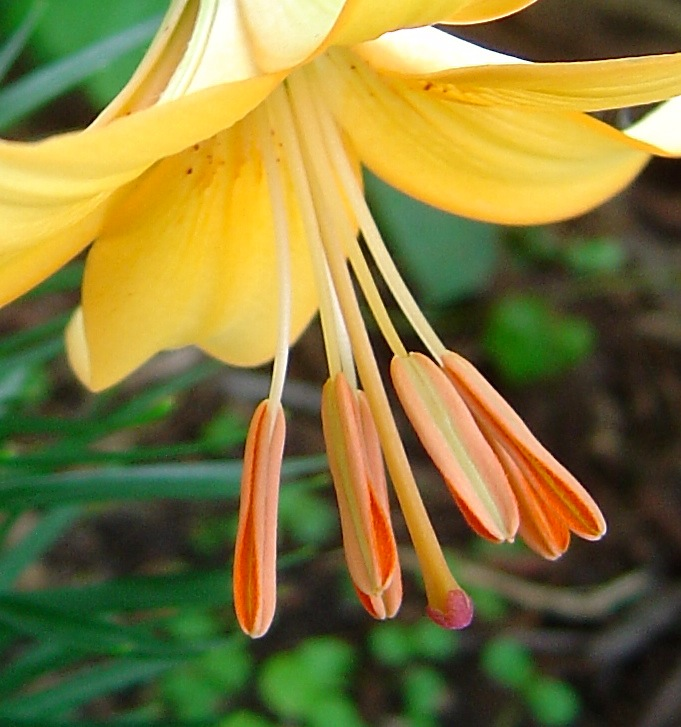
Longitudinal latrorse anther dehiscence

== Flower buds ==
Flower buds of Eucalyptus and related genera open with circumscissile dehiscence. A small cap separates from the remainder of the bud along a circular horizontal zone.

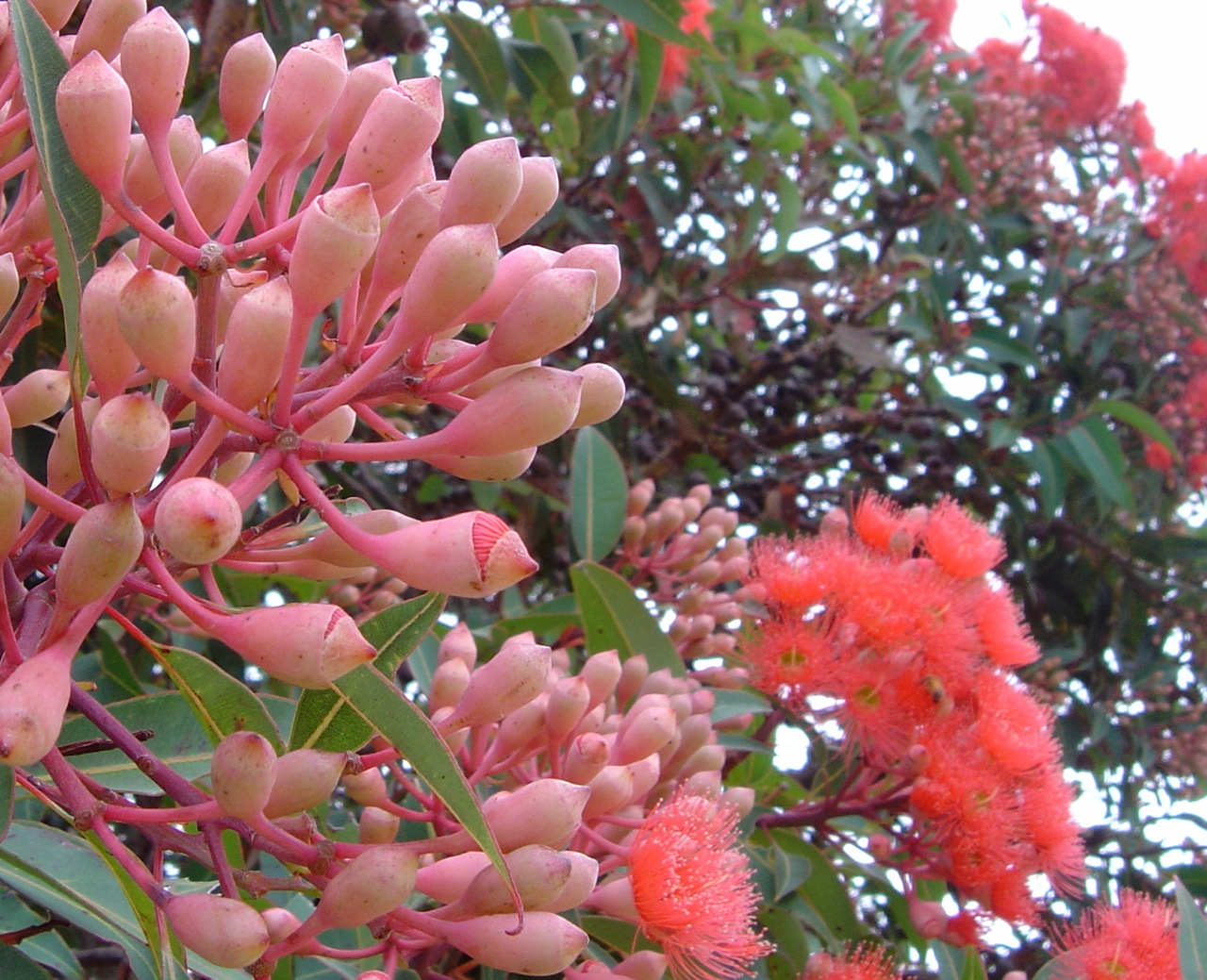
Corymbia ficifolia

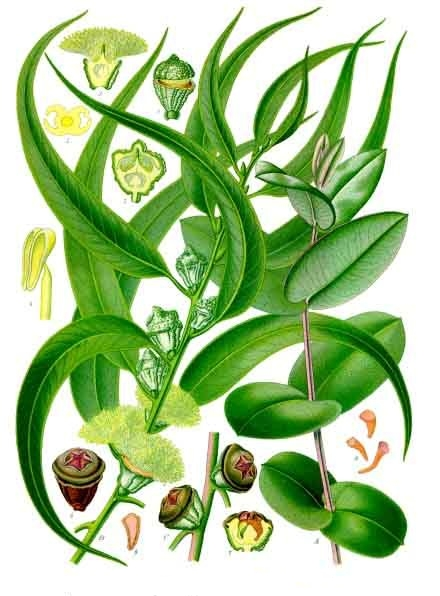
Eucalyptus globulus

== Fruit dehiscence ==
There are many different types of fruit dehiscence involving different types of structures. Some fruits are indehiscent, and do not open to disperse the seeds. Xerochasy is dehiscence that occurs upon drying, and hygrochasy is dehiscence that occurs upon wetting, the fruit being hygroscopic. Dehiscent fruits that are derived from one carpel are follicles or legumes, and those derived from multiple carpels are capsules or siliques.

One example of a dehiscent fruit is the silique. This fruit develops from a gynoecium composed of two fused carpels, which, upon fertilization, grow to become a silique that contains the developing seeds. After seed maturation, dehiscence takes place, and valves detach from the central septum, thus freeing the seeds. This is also known as shattering and can be important as a seed dispersal mechanism. This process is similar to anther dehiscence and the region that breaks (dehiscence zone) runs the entire length of the fruit between the valves (the outer walls of the ovary) and the replum (the persisting septa of the ovary). At maturity, the dehiscence zone is effectively a non-lignified layer between two regions of lignified cells in the valve and the replum. Shattering occurs due to the combination of cell wall loosening in the dehiscence zone and the tensions established by the differential hygro-responsive properties of the drying cells.

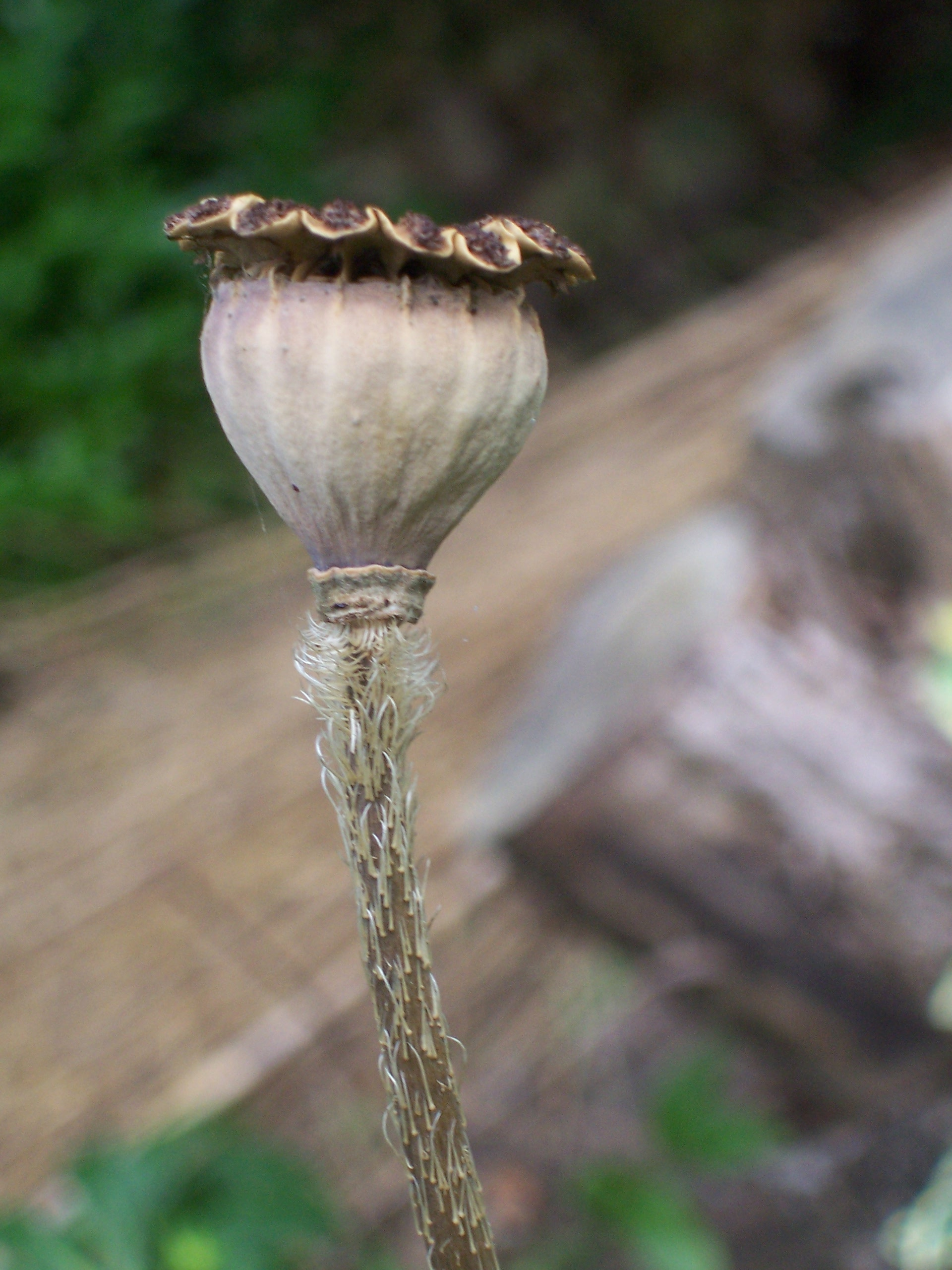
Poppy fruit showing poricidal dehiscence; the seeds exit through pores beneath the "crown"

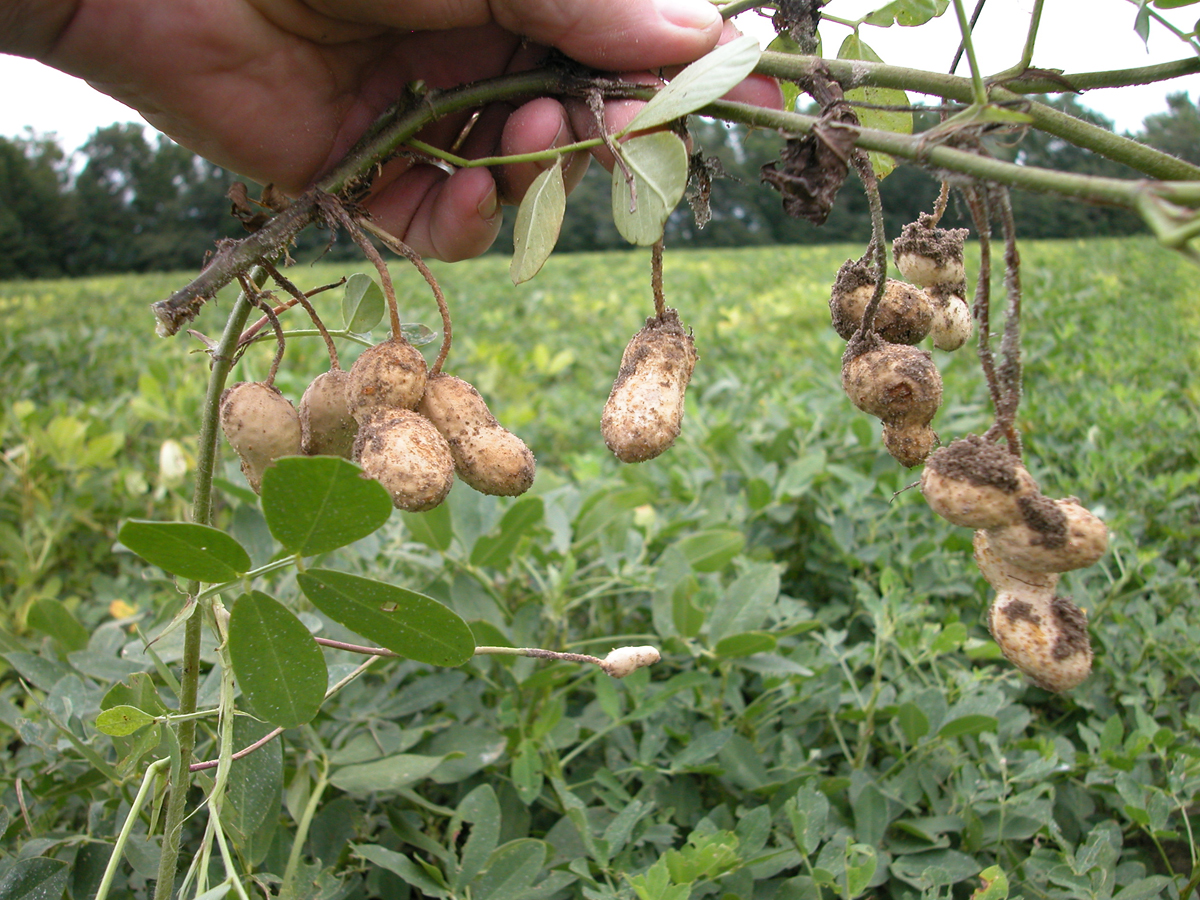
Peanuts: an indehiscent subterranean legume fruit

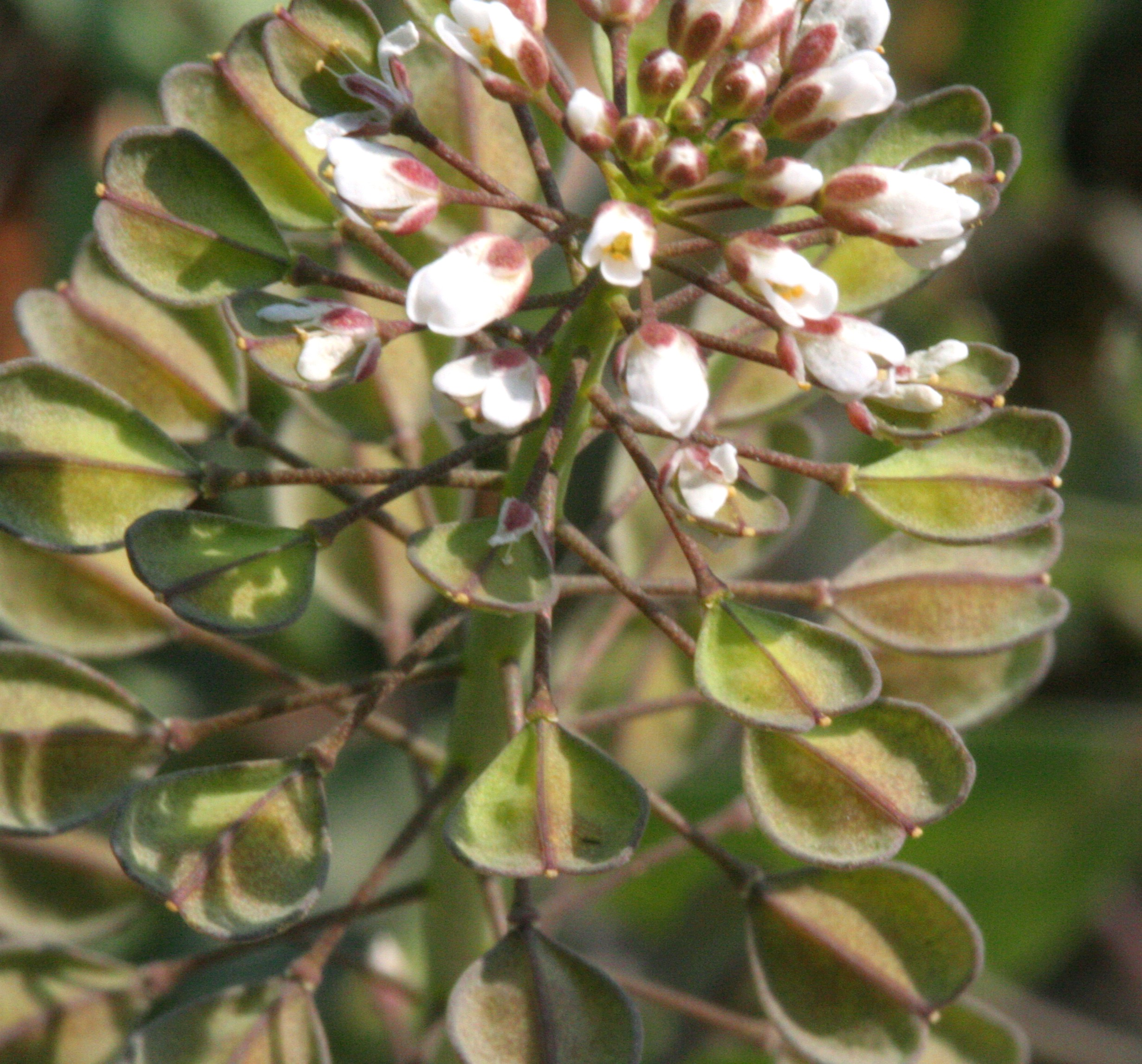
Thlaspi arvense, with fruit that are dehiscent siliques

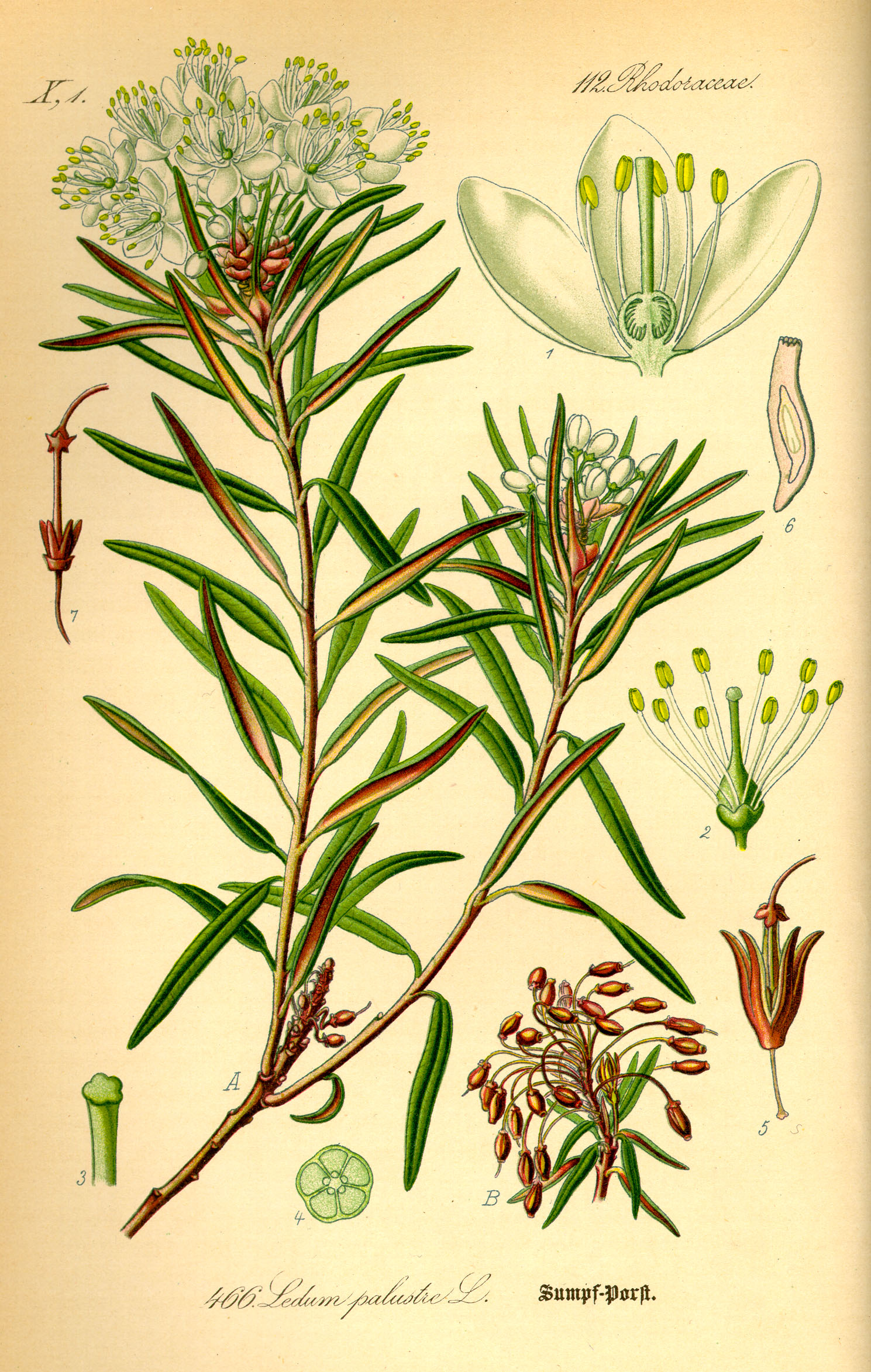
Rhododendron capsules have septicidal dehiscence; the fruit splits through the septa between the carpels

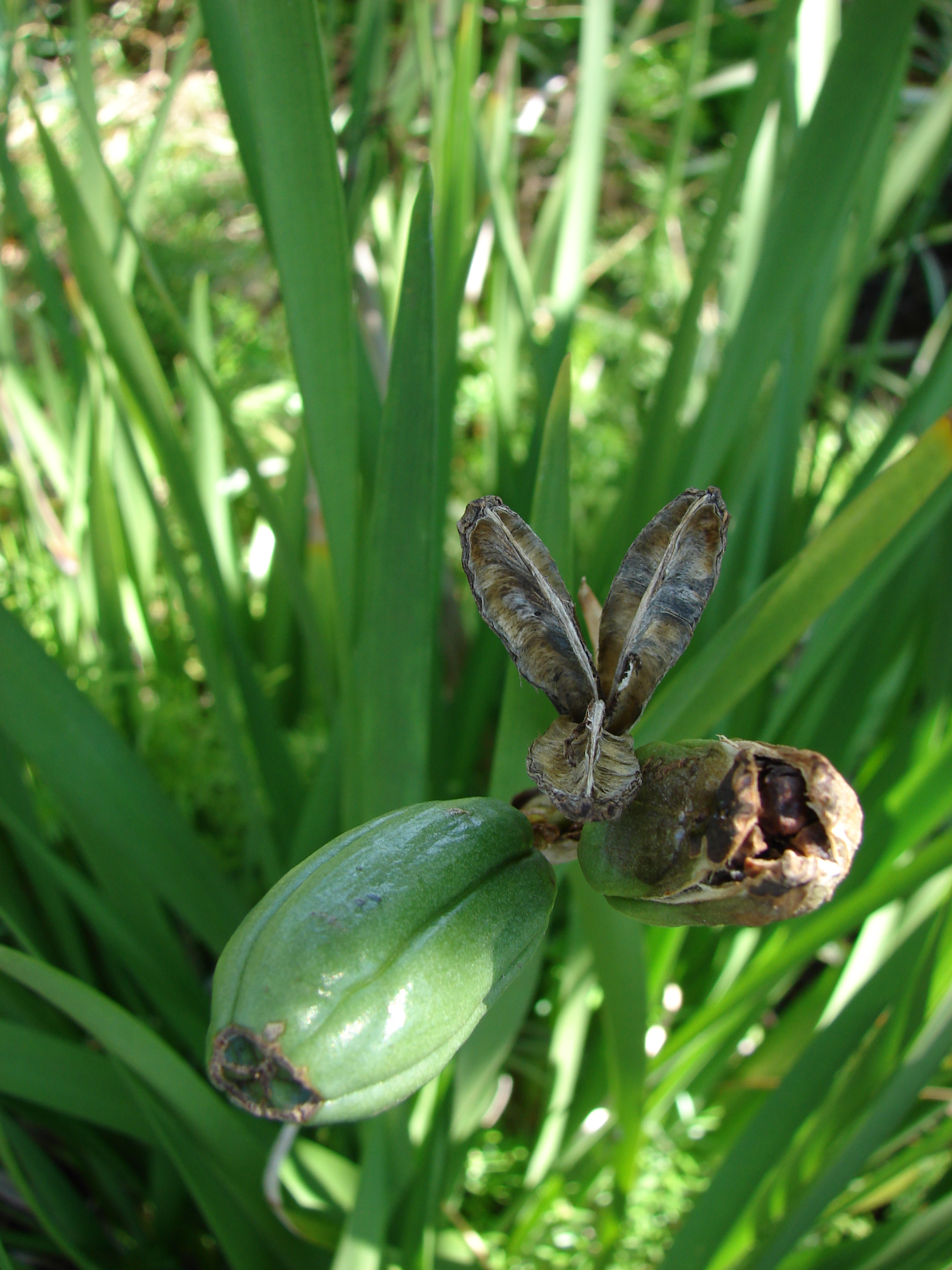
Iridaceae capsules have loculicidal dehiscence; the fruit splits through the ovary wall of each carpel, allowing the seeds to exit directly from the locule

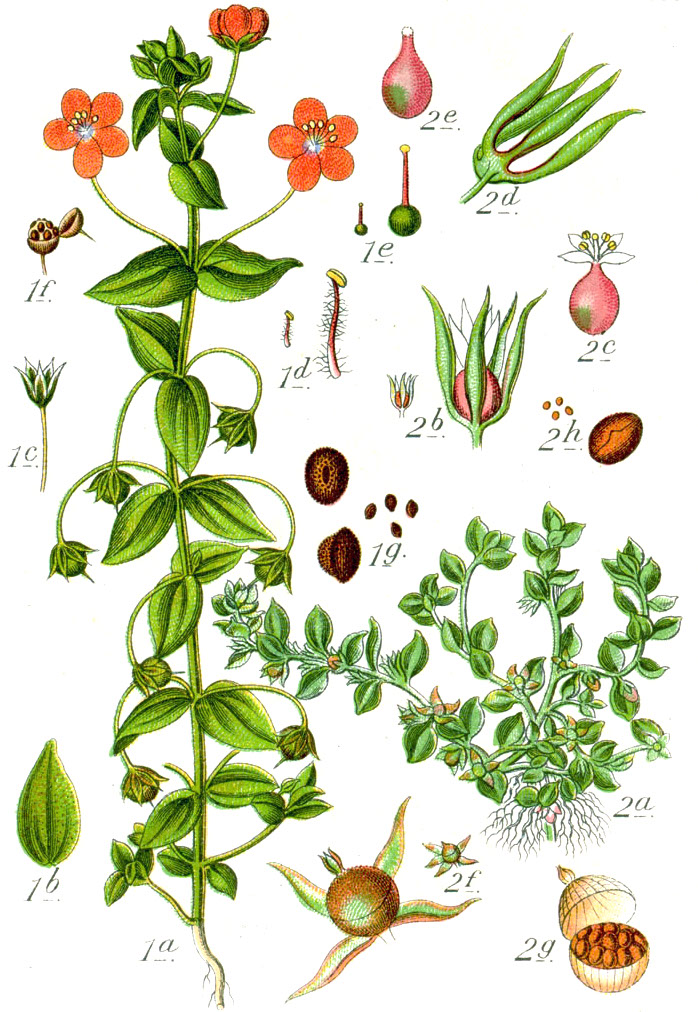
Anagallis fruits open with circumscissile dehiscence. A small cap separates from the remainder of the fruit along a circular horizontal zone.

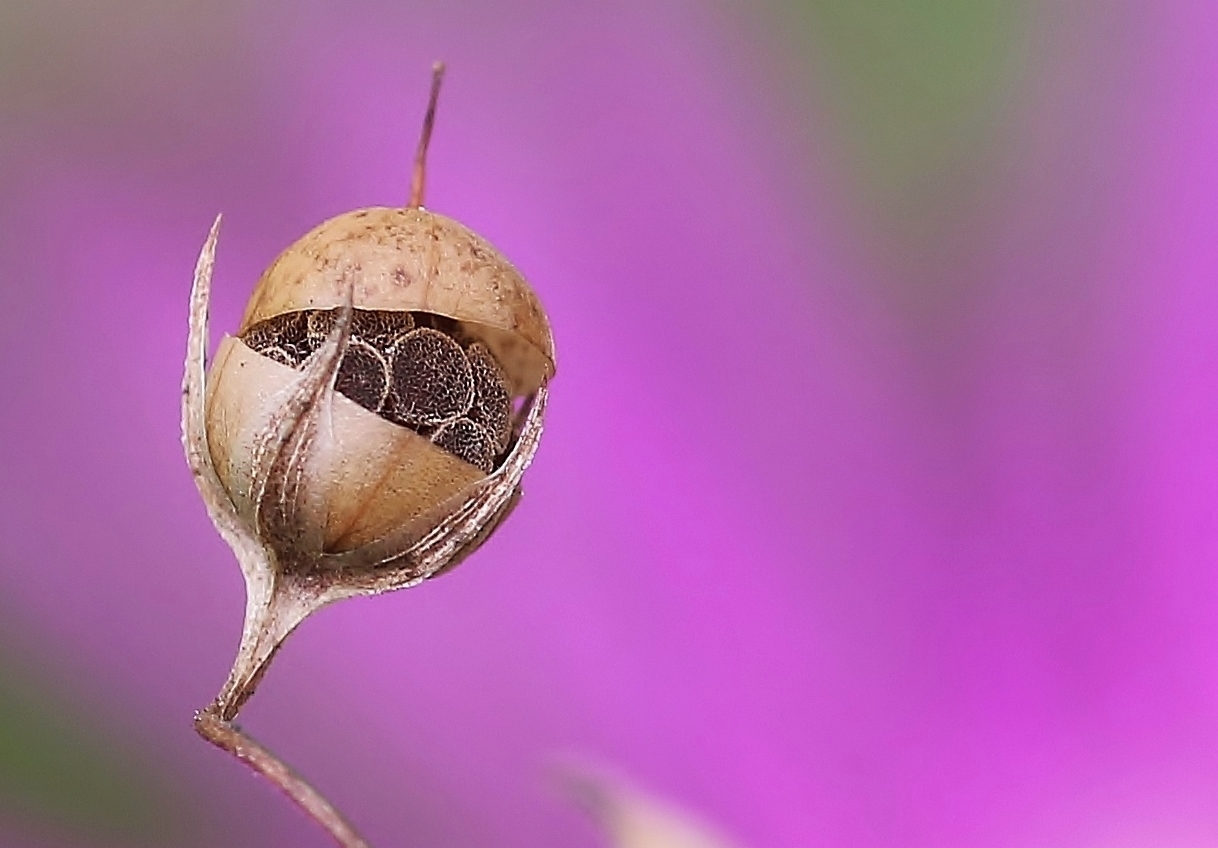
Anagallis fruit, circumscissile dehiscence

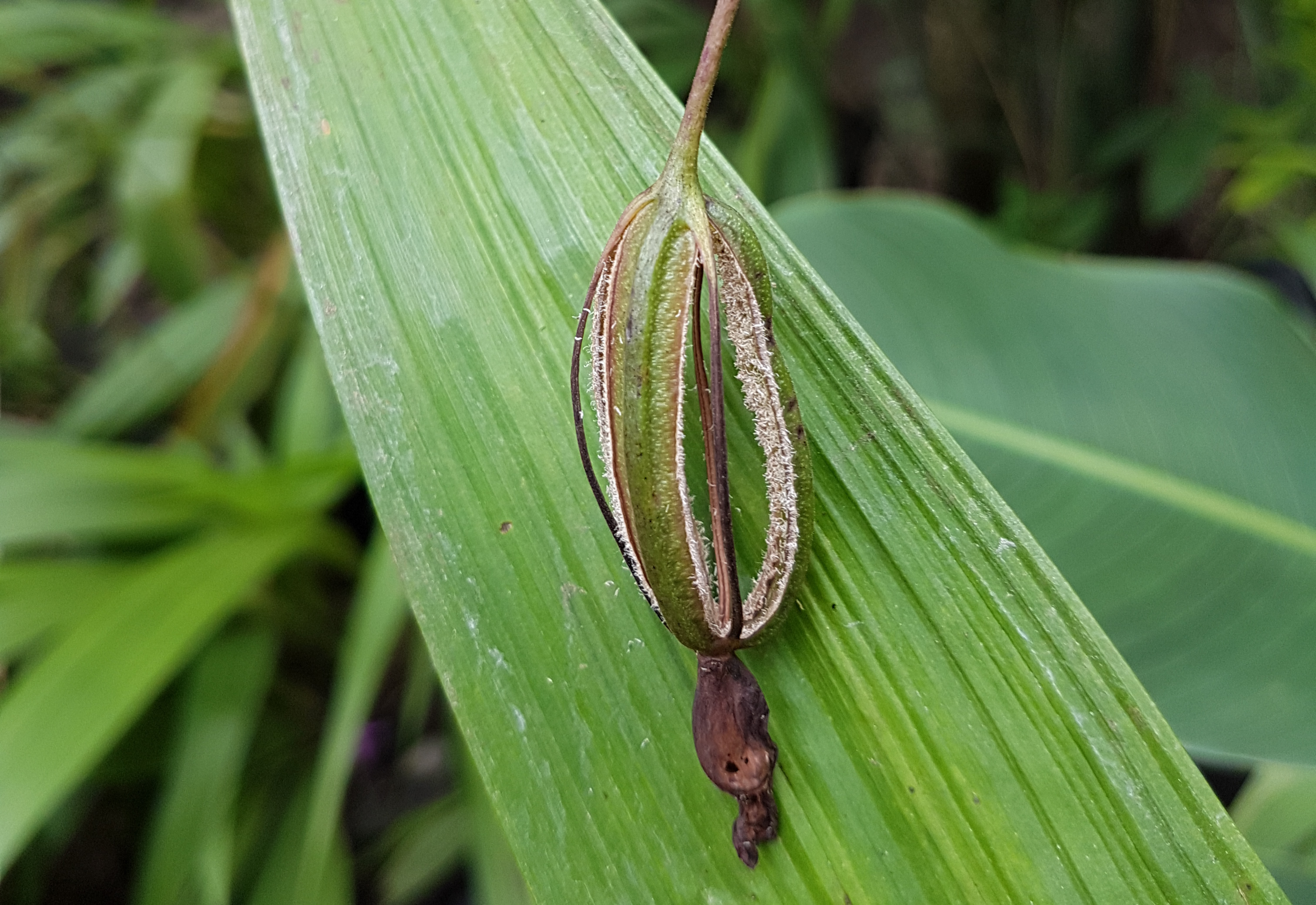
Spathoglottis plicata capsules, like in most orchids, split longitudinally along three to six slits while remaining closed at both ends

== Sporangium dehiscence in bryophytes ==
Endothecium tissue found in moss capsules functions in a similar way in dehiscence to the endothecium in the walls of anthers (see above).

== Sporangium dehiscence in ferns ==
Many leptosporangiate ferns have an annulus around the sporangium, which ejects the spores. Eusporangiate ferns do not generally have specialized dehiscence mechanisms.

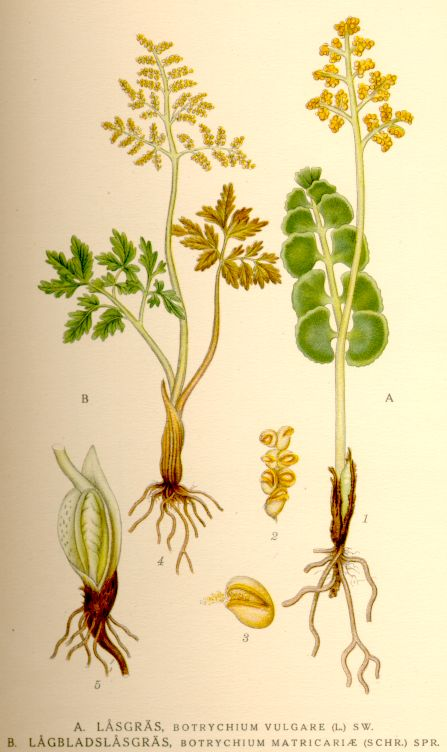
Sporangium dehiscence through a horizontal slit in Botrychium, a eusporangiate fern.

== Sporangium dehiscence in fungi and myxomycetes ==
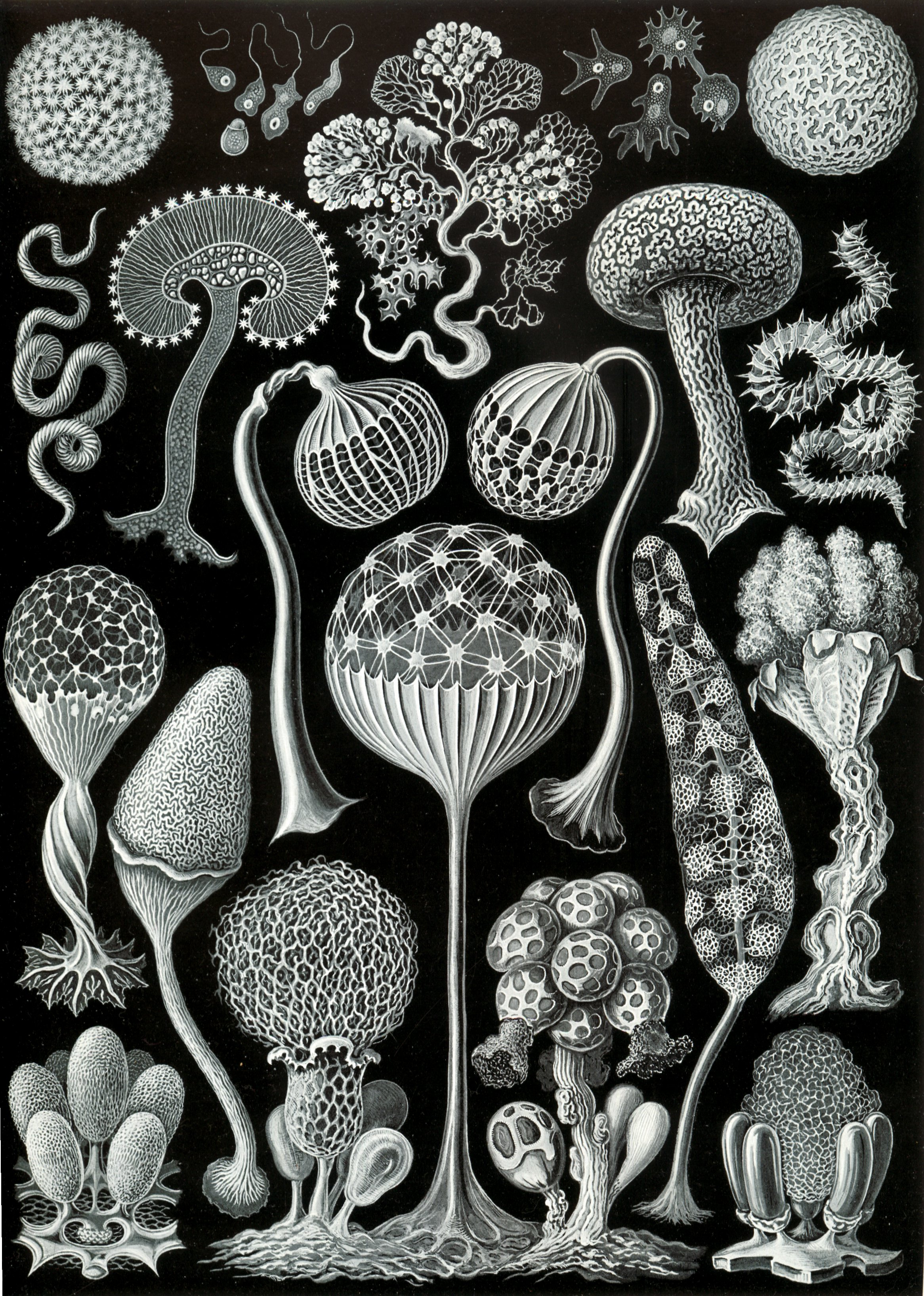
Various sporangia of myxomycetes that dehisce in varied ways

== See also ==
- Abscission—separation of structures that leads to their loss
- Anthesis—the opening of flowers
- Elaters—structures that form inside a sporangium and aid in spore dispersal of horsetails, liverworts, and hornworts
- Loment—a type of fruit that breaks apart but is not dehiscent
- Schizocarp—a type of fruit that breaks apart and may or may not be dehiscent.

== Bibliography ==
- Hickey, Michael; King, Clive (2000). The Cambridge illustrated glossary of botanical terms. Cambridge: Cambridge University Press. ISBN 978-0-521-79401-5.
