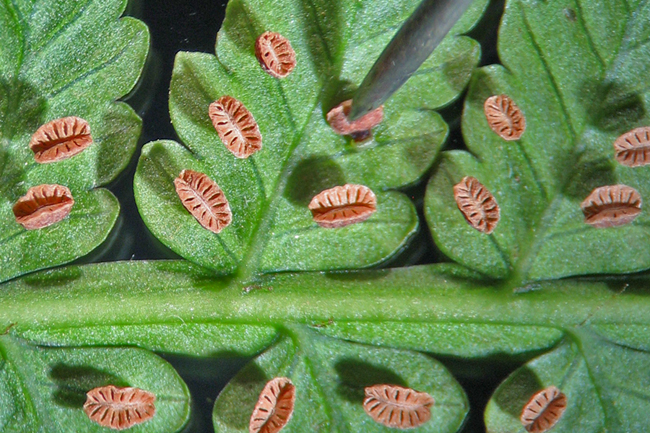
- Eupodium laeve

Scientific classification
- Kingdom: Plantae
- Clade: Tracheophytes
- Division: Polypodiophyta
- Class: Polypodiopsida
- Order: Marattiales
- Family: Marattiaceae
- Genus: Eupodium; J.Sm.

Type species
- Eupodium kaulfussii (Smith ex Hooker 1838) Hooker 1842

Species
- See text

Synonyms
- Gymnotheca Presl 1845 non Decaisne 1845

= Eupodium =

Genus of ferns

Eupodium is a genus of ferns in the family Marattiaceae native to the Neotropics. Traditionally, many taxonomists have included Eupodium within the genus Marattia (along with Ptisana). However, molecular phylogenetic studies and morphological studies of extant and fossil taxa support the recognition of Eupodium as a lineage distinct from Marattia. Morphologically, Eupodium was thought to be distinct among the Marattiaceae in only having one frond at a time (occasionally two), bearing awns along veins, and having stalked synangia (clusters of sporangia that have become fused in development). However, recent phylogenetic work found that an additional species native to Brazil, Eupodium cicutifolium, which lacks these characters, is also genetically in Eupodium, making the genus challenging to distinguish morphologically. Eupodium cicutifolium does occasionally have short-stalked synangia, and has spinulose spores like the other Eupodium species, but is otherwise easily mistaken for a Marattia or Ptisana.

The basal chromosome number for this genus is unknown. The type species is Eupodium kaulfussii.

== Taxonomy ==
The Christenhusz et al. classification of 2011 was the first classification based on molecular phylogeny to recognize Eupodium, placing it in Marattiaceae. Subsequent classifications have maintained this placement.

=== Species ===
As of October 2026, the Checklist of Ferns and Lycophytes of the World, World Flora Online,and Plants of the World Online recognize 4 species in Eupodium:

- Eupodium cicutifolium (Kaulf.) Lehtonen (Brazil, northern Argentina)
- Eupodium kaulfussii (J.Sm.) J.Sm. (Brazil)
- Eupodium laeve (Sm.) Murdock (Cuba, Hispaniola, Puerto Rico)
- Eupodium pittieri (Maxon) Christenh. (Central America, Colombia, Ecuador, Peru, Bolivia, Venezuela, Trinidad)

=== Phylogeny ===
The following phylogeny of Eupodium is based on GenBank plastid data.

- - - E. cicutifolium
    - E. kaulfussii
  - - E. laeve
    - E. pittieri
