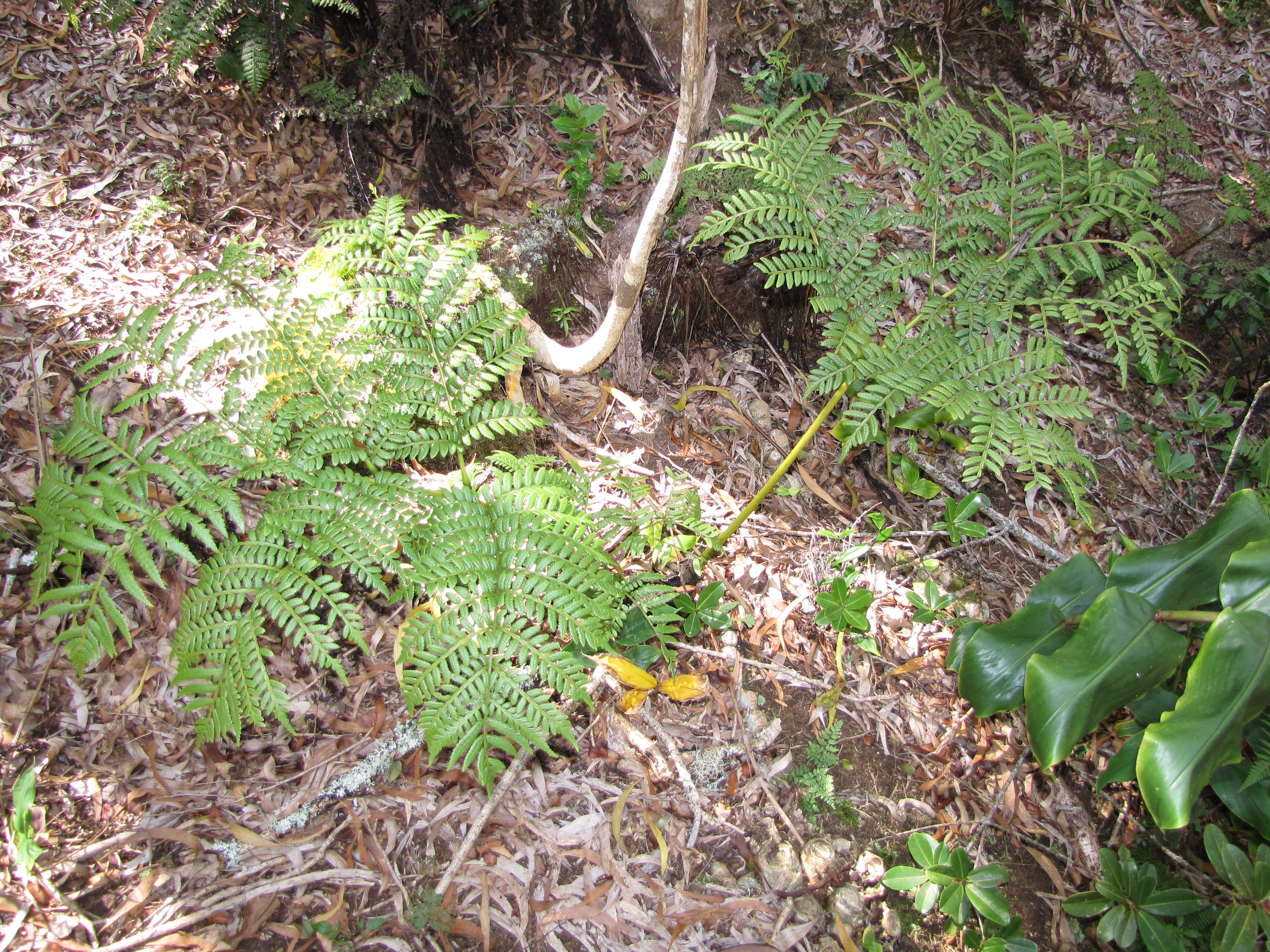
- Marattia douglasii

Scientific classification
- Kingdom: Plantae
- Clade: Tracheophytes
- Division: Polypodiophyta
- Class: Polypodiopsida
- Order: Marattiales
- Family: Marattiaceae
- Genus: Marattia; Swartz

Type species
- Marattia alata Swartz

Species
- See text

Synonyms
- Celanthera Thouin; Myriotheca Commerson ex de Jussieu non Zeiller; Discostegia Presl; Stibasia Presl; †Angiopteridium Schimper

= Marattia =

Genus of ferns

Marattia is a small genus of basal, large, fleshy eusporangiate ferns, found in the Americas.

Formerly considered to be a much larger genus, genetic analysis has shown that Marattia in the broad sense was paraphyletic, and subsequently the genera Ptisana and Eupodium were split off. Except for one species in Hawaii, the genus is neotropical.

The plants are large and terrestrial, with more or less erect rhizomes and fronds being 2-5 times pinnate. Sporangia are fused into synangia, and spores are monolete.

Basal chromosome count is 2n=80. The type species is M. alata.

== Taxonomy ==
The Smith et al. classification of 2006, based on molecular phylogeny, placed Marattia in Marattiaceae. It is the type genus of the family Marattiaceae, order Marattiales and class Marattiopsida. Subsequent classifications have maintained this placement.

=== Species ===
As of October 2026, the Checklist of Ferns and Lycophytes of the World and World Flora Online recognize 6 species in Marattia. Plants of the World Online recognizes 7 species.

- Marattia alata Sw. – Jamaica and Cuba
- Marattia douglasii (C. Presl) Baker – pala, kapua ilio, or Hawaii potato fern; Hawaii
- Marattia excavata Underw. – Mexico to Panama
- Marattia interposita Christ (includes M. chiricana, recognized by POWO) – Guatemala to Panama
- Marattia laxa Kunze – Mexico to Panama
- Marattia weinmanniifolia Liebm. – southern Mexico to El Salvador

=== Phylogeny ===
The following phylogeny of Marattia is based on GenBank plastid data.

- - M. douglasii
  - - M. laxa
    - - M. alata
      - M. weinmanniifolia
