= Georg Friedrich Kaulfuss =

German botanist and pteridologist

- Born: 8 April 1786
- Died: 9 December 1830 (aged 44)
- Scientific career
- Fields: Botany
- Author abbrev. (botany): Kaulf.

Georg Friedrich Kaulfuss (8 April 1786 – 9 December 1830) was a professor at Halle. He described the pteridophytes collected by Adelbert von Chamisso, and he named the fern Cibotium chamissoi after him. The genus Kaulfussia is named for Kaulfuss.

In 1816, he obtained his doctorate from the University of Halle, where in 1823, he became a full professor of botany.

== Plants Named by Kaulfuss ==
More than 200 plant names were published by Kaulfuss. These include the genera:

- Cibotium Kaulf. 1820
- Cochlidium Kaulf. 1820
- Saccoloma Kaulf. 1820
- Balantium Kaulf. 1824
- Sadleria Kaulf. 1824

Plant families named by Kaulfuss include:

- Marattiaceae Kaulf. 1824
- Cyatheaceae Kaulf. 1827

== Works by Kaulfuss ==
- Kaulfuss, Georg Friedrich. Enumeratio Filicum. 1824.
