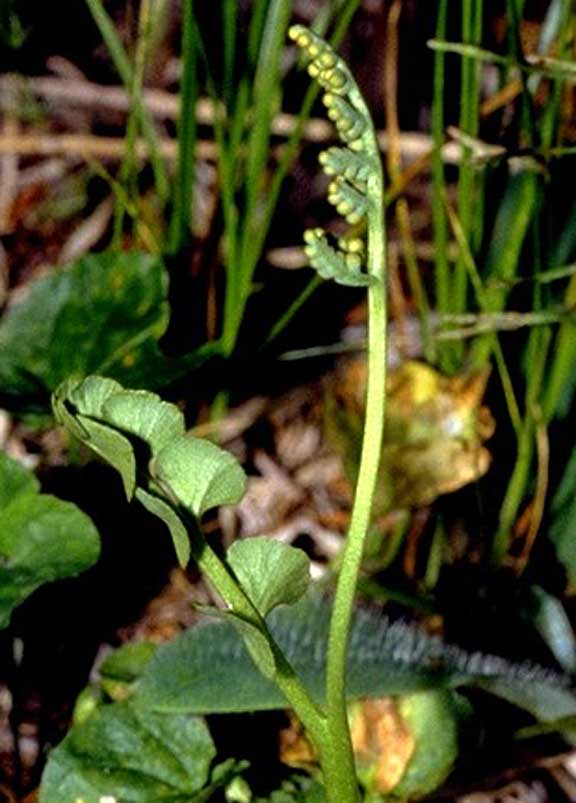
- Botrychium lunaria

Scientific classification
- Kingdom: Plantae
- Clade: Tracheophytes
- Division: Polypodiophyta
- Class: Polypodiopsida
- Subclass: Ophioglossidae; Klinge 1882

Type genus
- Ophioglossum L.

Orders
- Ophioglossales; Psilotales

Synonyms
- Psilotopsida

= Ophioglossidae =

Subclass of ferns

Ophioglossidae is one of the four subclasses of Polypodiopsida (ferns). This subclass consists of the ferns commonly known as whisk ferns, grape ferns, adder's-tongues and moonworts. It is equivalent to the class Psilotopsida in previous treatments, including Smith et al. (2006). The subclass contains two orders, Psilotales and Ophioglossales, whose relationship was only confirmed by molecular phylogenetic studies.

== Taxonomy ==
Smith et al. (2006) carried out the first higher-level pteridophyte classification published in the molecular phylogenetic era, and considered the ferns (monilophytes), with four classes. They placed the whisk ferns and related taxa in the class Psilotopsida, with two orders. Mark W. Chase and James L. Reveal (2009) classified them as two separate subclasses, Psilotidae and Ophioglossidae, corresponding to those orders within a much broader grouping, the class Equisetopsida sensu lato. Christenhusz et al., 2011, included both the Ophioglossales and Psilotales orders in the Ophioglossidae subclass. This was continued by both Christenhusz and Chase (2014) and by the Pteridophyte Phylogeny Group (2016). Under the latter the subclass is one of four subclasses of Polypodiopsida (ferns) and contains two orders, two families, 12 genera, and an estimated 129 species. The relationships between the two orders, Psilotales and Ophioglossales, has long been unclear and was only confirmed by molecular systematic studies. Psilotales have rhizomes instead of real roots, and the roots of Ophioglossales lack both branching and root hairs. The gametophytes of both orders are heterotrophic and often subterranean, obtaining nutrients from mycorrhiza instead of light. Photosynthesis happens exclusively in the sporophyte.

The following cladogram shows a likely phylogenic relationship between subclass Ophioglossidae and the other Polypodiopsida subclasses. The first three small subclasses are sometimes informally referred to as eusporangiate ferns, in contrast to the largest subclass, Polypodiidae or leptosporangiate ferns.

- Polypodiopsida
  - Equisetidae
  - - Ophioglossidae
    - - Marattiidae
      - Polypodiidae

The two orders, Ophioglossales and Psilotales are sister groups to each other.

== Bibliography ==
- Chase, Mark W.; Reveal, James L. (2009). "A phylogenetic classification of the land plants to accompany APG III". Botanical Journal of the Linnean Society. 161 (2): 122–127. doi:10.1111/j.1095-8339.2009.01002.x.
- Christenhusz, M. J. M.; Zhang, X. C.; Schneider, H. (18 February 2011). "A linear sequence of extant families and genera of lycophytes and ferns". Phytotaxa. 19 (1): 7. doi:10.11646/phytotaxa.19.1.2. hdl:10138/28042.
- Christenhusz, Maarten J.M.; Chase, Mark W. (2014). "Trends and concepts in fern classification". Annals of Botany. 113 (4): 571–594. doi:10.1093/aob/mct299. PMC 3936591. PMID 24532607.
- Pryer, Kathleen M.; Schneider, Harald; Smith, Alan R.; Cranfill, Raymond; Wolf, Paul G.; Hunt, Jeffrey S.; Sipes, Sedonia D. (2001). "Horsetails and ferns are a monophyletic group and the closest living relatives to seed plants". Nature. 409 (6820): 618–622. doi:10.1038/35054555. PMID 11214320. S2CID 4367248.
- Pteridophyte Phylogeny Group (November 2016). "A community-derived classification for extant lycophytes and ferns". Journal of Systematics and Evolution. 54 (6): 563–603. doi:10.1111/jse.12229. S2CID 39980610.
- Schneider, Harald; Smith, Alan R.; Pryer, Kathleen M. (1 July 2009). "Is Morphology Really at Odds with Molecules in Estimating Fern Phylogeny?". Systematic Botany. 34 (3): 455–475. doi:10.1600/036364409789271209. S2CID 85855934.
- Smith, Alan R.; Kathleen M. Pryer; Eric Schuettpelz; Petra Korall; Harald Schneider; Paul G. Wolf (2006). "A classification for extant ferns" (PDF). Taxon. 55 (3): 705–731. doi:10.2307/25065646. JSTOR 25065646.
