= Annulus (botany) =

Ring of specialized cells on the sporangium

An annulus in botany is for ferns an arc or a ring of specialized cells on the sporangium. These cells are arranged in a single row, and are associated with the release or dispersal of spores. In mosses it is a ring of cells around the tip of the sporangium. In flowers it is a ring of hairs within the flower tube.

== Ferns ==
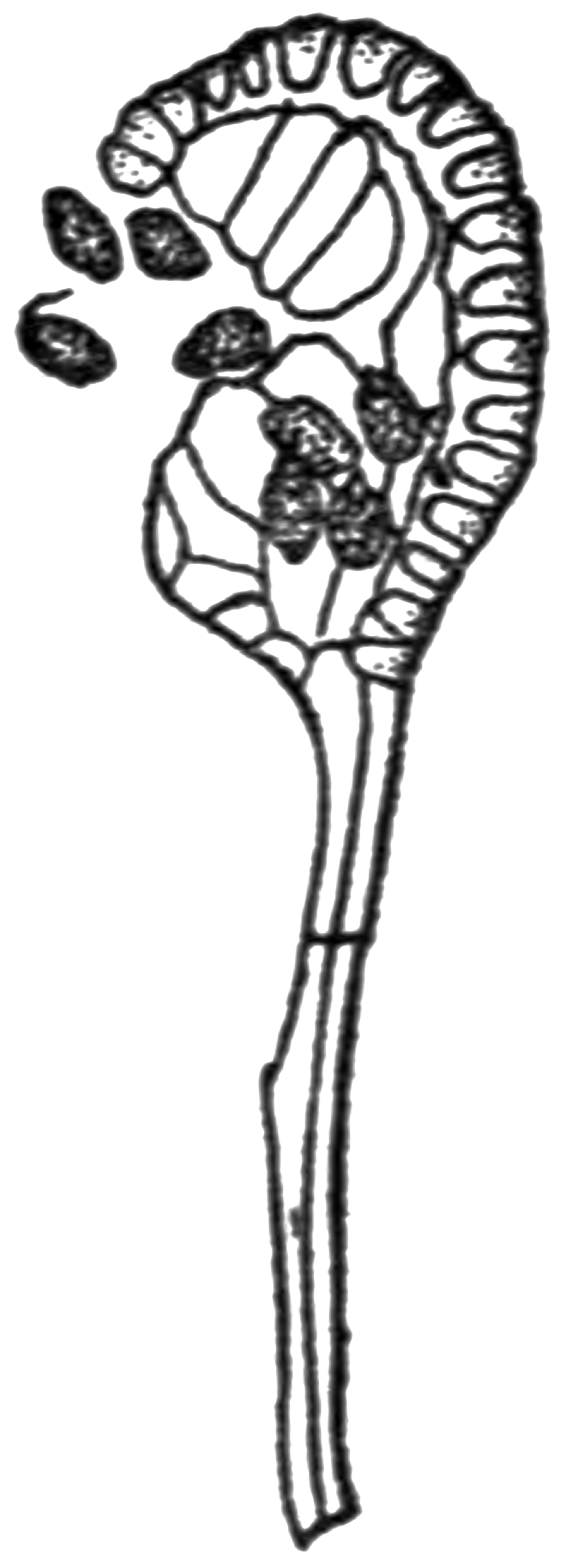
Ferns: Sporangium of Polypodium vulgare with annulus on the right.

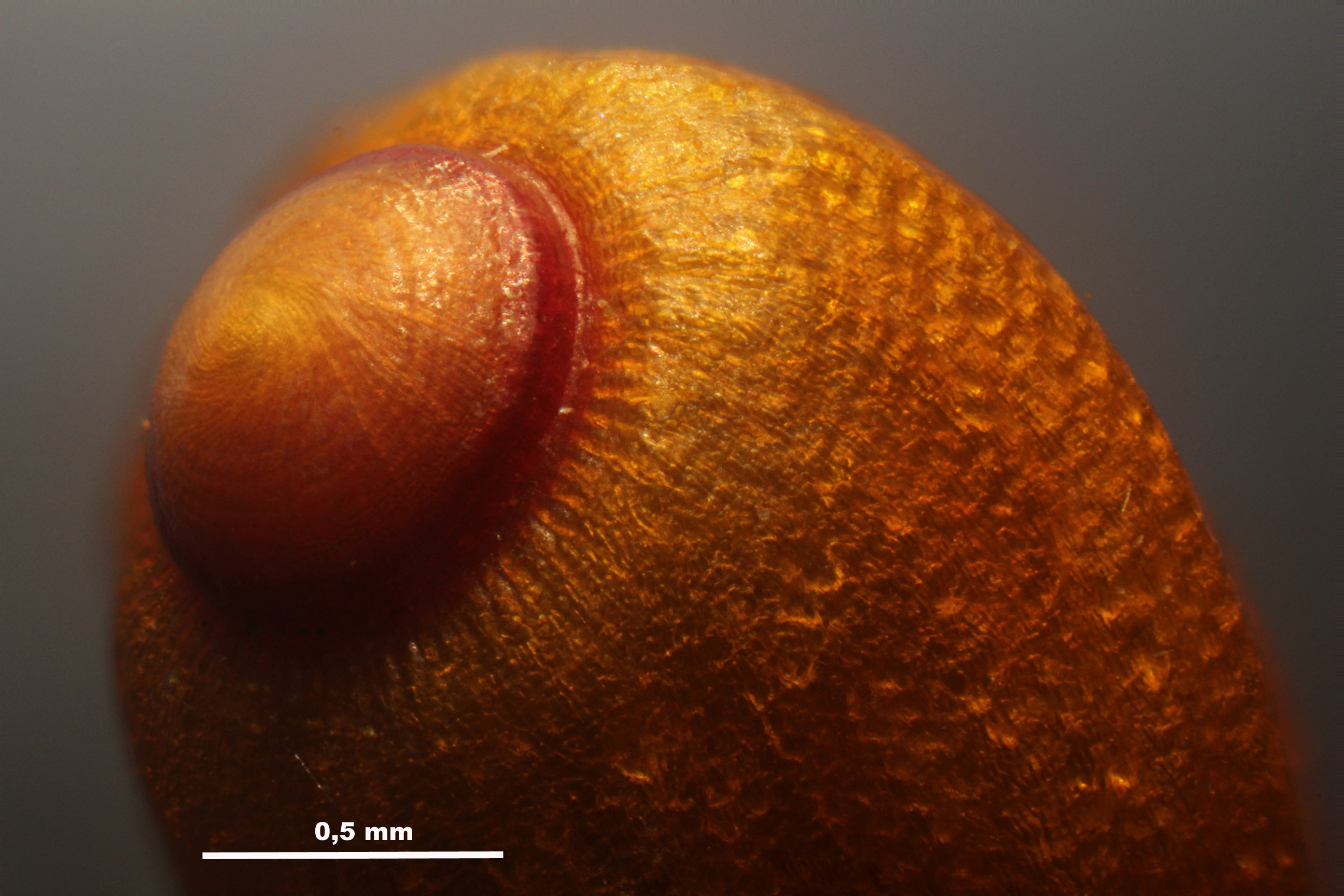
Mosses: Sporangium of the moss Funaria hygrometrica with well-defined annulus.

In leptosporangiate ferns, the annulus located on the outer rim of the sporangium and serves in spore dispersal. It consists typically of a ring or belt of dead water-filled cells with differentially thickened cell walls that stretches about two-thirds around each sporangium in leptosporangiate ferns. The thinner walls on the outside allow water to evaporate quickly under dry conditions. This dehiscence causes the cells to shrink and a contraction and straightening of the annulus ring, eventually rupturing the sporangial wall by ripping apart thin-walled lip cells on the opposite side of the sporangium. The annulus slowly straightens and continues to evert sometimes to the extent that the two ends of the recurved annulus almost meet. As more water evaporates, air bubbles form in the cells causing the contracted annulus to snap forward again, thus dislodging and launching the spores away from the plant. The type and position of the annulus is variable (e.g. patch, apical, oblique, or vertical) and can be used to distinguish major groups of leptosporangiate ferns.

=== Spore dispersal ===
The spores are dispersed through a catapult-like system, flinging the spores out briefly at up to 10m/s. This is caused by the gradual build up of a high negative pressure (200-300 atmospheres) within annulus cells from water loss. As these cells lose water, they shrink, and are designed to inwardly bend on the outer face of the annulus. Nearly all the spores are carried on the free end in a cup formed by the lateral walls of the sporangium. After reaching a critical threshold cavitation occurs, releasing the tension and causing rapid cell expansion in the annulus, where the potential energy stored in the cells are converted extremely rapidly into kinetic energy, flinging the spores and closing the sporangium. The closure of the sporangium occurs in two phases, with a sharp deceleration midway through to allow the spores to be launched while the annulus is still open - similar in function to a crossbar in a catapult, this is to prevent the annulus snapping shut with the spores still contained in the sporangium.

== Mosses ==
In mosses, an annulus is a complete ring of cells around the tip of the sporangium, which dissolve to allow the cap to fall off and the spores to be released.

== Flowering Plants ==
In some species of flowering plants, a ring of hairs is found within the flower tube and may be referred to as the annulus; as part of the reproductive system, this ring of hairs is often used to differentiate similar-looking species.
