= Christensenia aesculifolia =

Scientific classification
- Kingdom: Plantae
- Clade: Tracheophytes
- Division: Polypodiophyta
- Class: Polypodiopsida
- Order: Marattiales
- Family: Marattiaceae
- Genus: Christensenia
- Species: C. aesculifolia

Binomial name
- Christensenia aesculifolia (Blume) Maxon

Species of fern

Christensenia aesculifolia is a species of tropical fern found throughout southeast Asia. Its leaves resemble horse chestnuts.
