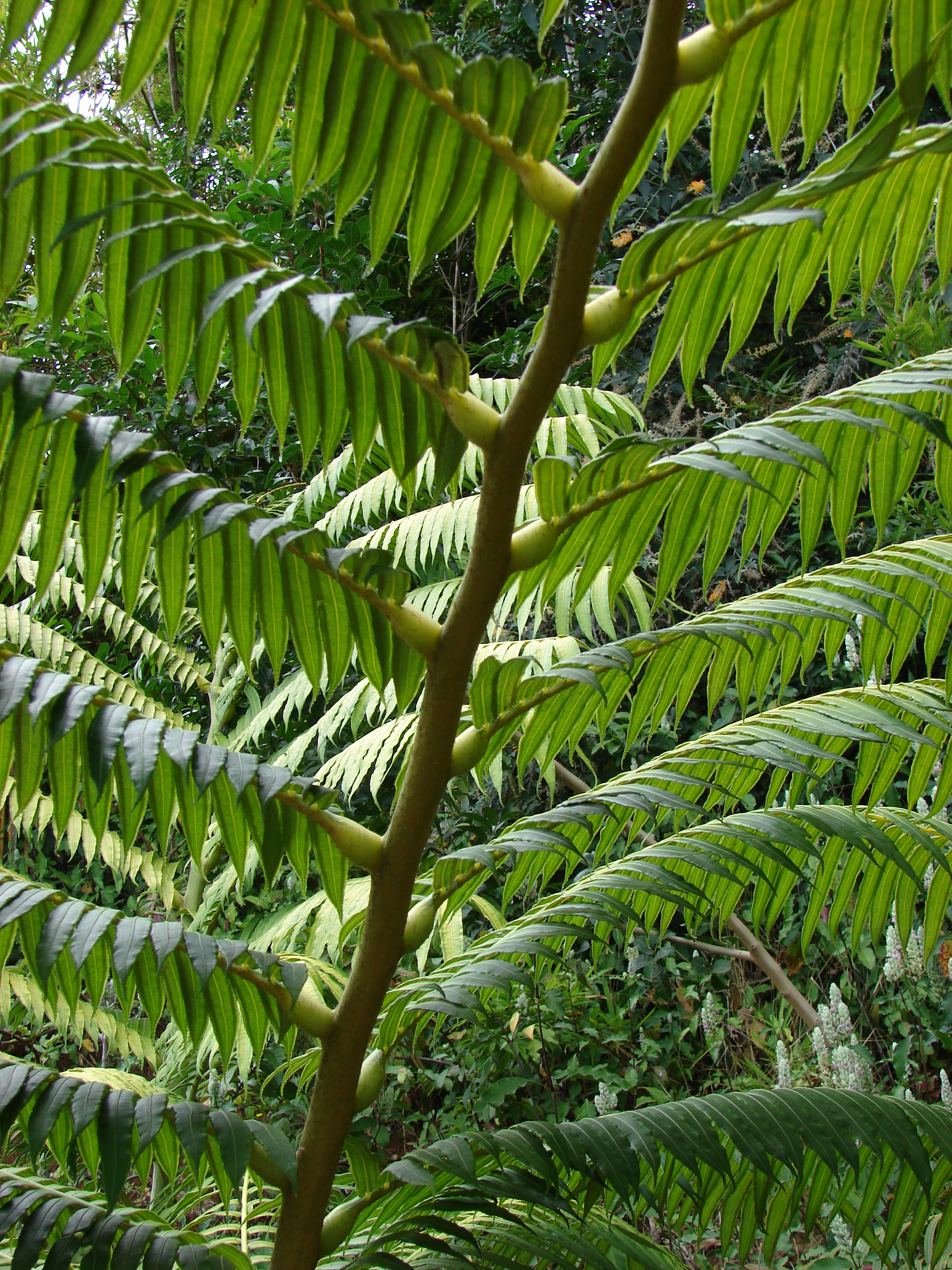
- Angiopteris evecta frond

Scientific classification
- Kingdom: Plantae
- Clade: Tracheophytes
- Division: Polypodiophyta
- Class: Polypodiopsida
- Subclass: Marattiidae; Klinge
- Order: Marattiales; Link
- Family: Marattiaceae; Kaulf.

Genera
- See text.

Synonyms
- Angiopteridaceae Fée ex Bommer; Christenseniaceae Ching; Danaeaceae Agardh; Kaulfussiaceae Campb.

= Marattiaceae =

Marattiaceae Temporal range: Carboniferous–Recent

Family of ferns

Marattiaceae is the only family of extant (living) ferns in the order Marattiales. In the Pteridophyte Phylogeny Group classification of 2016 (PPG I), Marattiales is the only order in the subclass Marattiidae. The family has six genera and about 110 species. Many are different in appearance from other ferns, having large fronds and fleshy rootstocks.

== Description ==
The Marattiaceae diverged from other ferns very early in their evolutionary history and are quite different from many plants familiar to people in temperate zones. Many of them have massive, fleshy rootstocks and the largest known fronds of any fern. The Marattiaceae is one of two groups of ferns traditionally known as eusporangiate ferns, meaning that the sporangium is formed from a group of cells as opposed to a leptosporangium in which there is a single initial cell. At least two genera, Angiopteris and Marattia, have been reported to undergo monoplastidic meiosis rather than polyplastidic meiosis, and are the only known examples within euphyllophytes to do so.

The large fronds characteristic of the group are most readily found in the genus Angiopteris, native to Australasia, Madagascar and Oceania. These fronds may be up to 9 meters long in the species Angiopteris teysmanniana of Java. In the Hawaiian Islands, Costa Rica, and Jamaica, the species Angiopteris evecta is naturalized, having escaped from botanical gardens, and is considered an invasive species. Angiopteris is unique among ferns in having explosively dispersed spores, which may contribute to its ability to spread.

Marattia in the strict sense is found in the neotropics and Hawaii with six recognized species. The genus Eupodium is also neotropical, with three species, and was originally described for the distinctive stalked synangia of some species.

Ptisana is a paleotropical genus, formerly thought to be part of Marattia. These plants are 2-4 times pinnate, with fronds often comparable in size to those found in Angiopteris. Terminal segments usually have a prominent suture where they attach. The sporangia lack the labiate apertures of Marattia and Eupodium, and synangia are deeply cut. The name of the genus derives from the resemblance of the synangia to pearl barley. The king fern, Ptisana salicina, from New Zealand and the South Pacific and known in Māori as "para" now has been placed in this genus. Sometimes called the potato fern, this is a large fern with an edible fleshy rhizome that is used as a food source by some indigenous peoples.

The East-Asian genus Christensenia, named after the Danish pteridologist Carl Christensen, is an uncommon fern with distinctive fronds resembling a horse chestnut leaf, hence the species Christensenia aesculifolia, meaning horse-chestnut-leaved Christensenia. Despite the relatively diminutive size of plants in this genus, the stomata of Christensenia are the largest known in the plant kingdom.

The genus Danaea is endemic to the Neotropics. They have bipinnate leaves with opposite pinnae, which are dimorphic, the fertile leaves much contracted, and covered below with sunken, linear synangia dehiscing via pores.

== Taxonomy ==
in the Pteridophyte Phylogeny Group classification of 2016 (PPG I), Marattiaceae is the only family in the order Marattiales, which in turn is the only order in the subclass Marattiidae. Marattiidae is one of four subclasses of class Polypodiopsida (ferns), to which it is related as shown in this cladogram, being a sister group to Polypodiidae.

- Polypodiopsida
  - Equisetidae
  - - Ophioglossidae
    - - Marattiidae
      - Polypodiidae

=== History of classification ===
In the molecular phylogenetic classification of Smith et al. in 2006, the Marattiales formed the single member of the class Marattiopsida. Four genera were recognized. The class was lowered in rank to the subclass Marattiidae in the 2009 classification of Mark W. Chase and James L. Reveal, and subsequent systems such as Christenhusz et al. (2011). The Pteridophyte Phylogeny Group (2016) classification retains this rank. In that system, Marattiidae is monotypic and has one order, Marattiales, one family, Marattiaceae, six genera, and an estimated 111 species.

There have long been four traditional extant genera (Angiopteris, Christensenia, Danaea and Marattia), but phylogenetic analysis has determined the genus Marattia to be paraphyletic, and the genus has been split into three genera, Marattia in the strict sense, Eupodium, and Ptisana. Christenhusz and Chase placed Danaea in subfamily Danaeoideae and the remaining genera in subfamily Marattioideae, but this subfamilial classification was not taken up by PPG I.

This fern group has a long fossil history with many extinct taxa (Psaronius, Asterotheca, Scolecopteris, Eoangiopteris, Qasimia, Marantoidea, Danaeites, Marattiopsis, Ptychocarpus, etc.).

=== Genera ===
Exploring the phylogeny of the marattialean ferns

- - Danaeoideae
    Danaea
  - Marattioideae
    - †Marattiopsis
    - - - Eupodium
        - Ptisana
      - - Christensenia
        - - Marattia
          - Angiopteris

Fern Tree of Life

- - Danaeoideae
    Danaea
  - Marattioideae
    - - Eupodium
      - Ptisana
    - - Marattia
      - - Christensenia
        - Angiopteris

Six genera are accepted in the PPG I classification:

- Angiopteris Hoffm.
- Christensenia Maxon
- Danaea Sm.
- Eupodium J.Sm.
- Marattia Sw.
- Ptisana Murdock

Several other genera have been named in the Marattiaceae, namely: Archangiopteris, Clementea, Macroglossum, Protangiopteris, Protomarattia and Psilodochea. These are currently treated as synonyms of Angiopteris.

== Evolutionary history ==
Marattiaceae are one of the earliest branching lineages of ferns. The earliest members of the family appeared during the Carboniferous, over 300 million years ago. The group has an extensive fossil record extending from the Carboniferous into the Jurassic, but post-Jurassic records are scarce.
