= Christensenia (plant) =

Scientific classification
- Kingdom: Plantae
- Clade: Tracheophytes
- Division: Polypodiophyta
- Class: Polypodiopsida
- Order: Marattiales
- Family: Marattiaceae
- Genus: Christensenia; Maxon

Type species
- Christensenia aesculifolia (Blume) Maxon

Synonyms
- Kaulfussia C.Presl

Genus of ferns

Christensenia is a genus of ferns in the botanical family Marattiaceae. The genus is confined to the Indo-Malayan region. The basal chromosome number for this genus is 2n=80.

Christensenia is unique in the Marattiaceae, because of its reticulate venation, palmately arranged leaves and radial synangia. Christensenia produces enormous amounts of spores, up to 7,000 spores per sporangium. The radial synangium is very similar to some of the fossil Asterothecaceae/Psaroniaceae, such as Scolecopteris. Christensenia itself has no fossil record. Christensenia is notable for having the largest known stomata of any land plant, and a stomatal structure that is permanently open, restricting the genus to high-humidity environments.

== Taxonomy ==
The Smith et al. classification of 2006, based on molecular phylogeny, placed Christensenia in Marattiaceae. Subsequent classifications have maintained this placement.

=== Species ===
Some taxonomists have recognized only one variable species of Christensia across its range, while others have described a small number of regionally restricted species including Christensenia assamica (Griff.) Ching from India and Christensenia cumingiana Christ from Mindanao. The 1993 revision by Cristina Rolleri recognized two species. Rolleri's arrangement has been followed by the Checklist of Ferns and Lycophytes of the World, World Flora Online, and Plants of the World Online:

- Christensenia aesculifolia (Blume) Maxon (type species)
- Christensenia lobbiana (de Vriese) Rolleri
