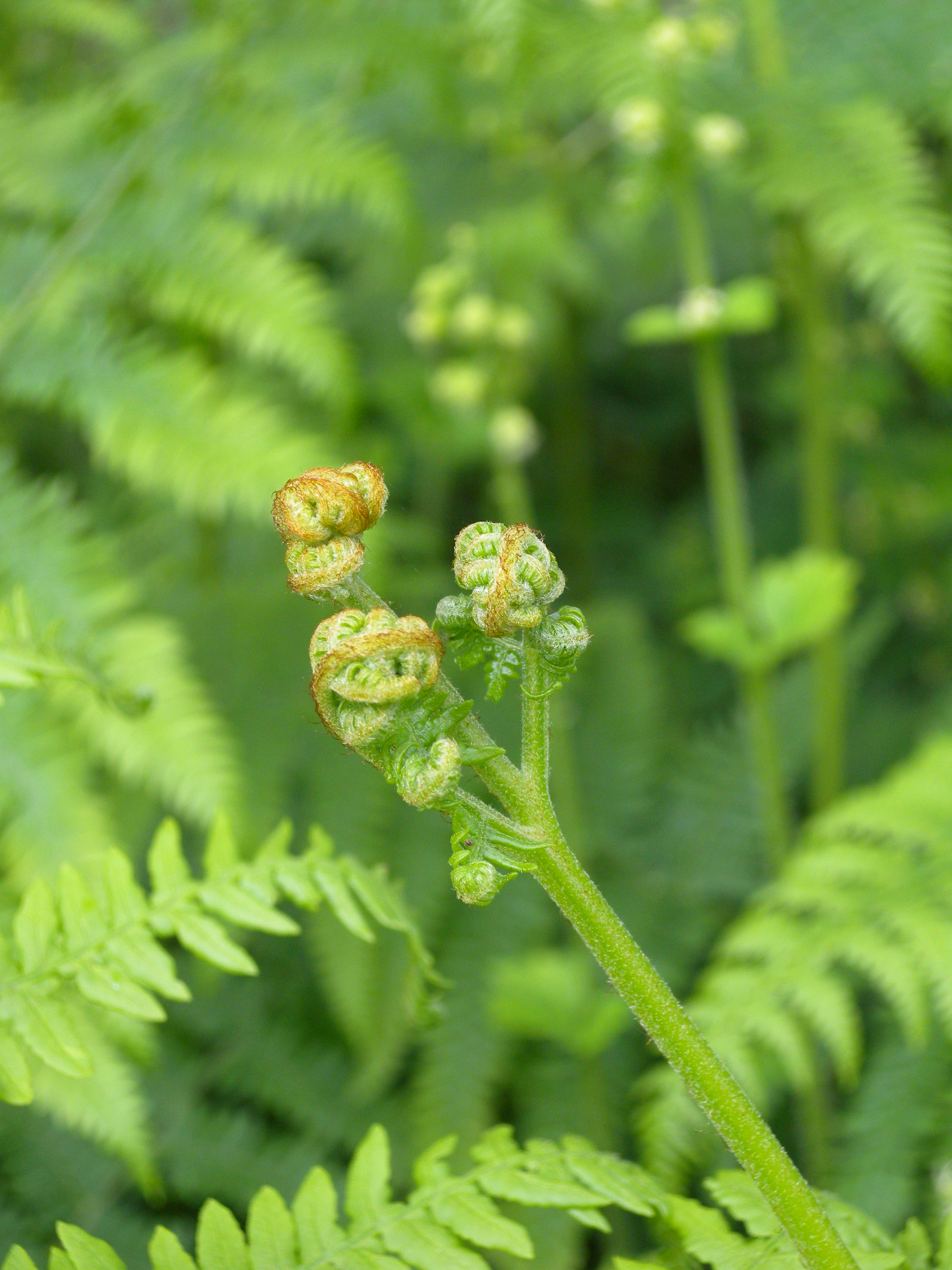
- Pteridium aquilinum

Scientific classification
- Kingdom: Plantae
- Clade: Tracheophytes
- Division: Polypodiophyta
- Class: Polypodiopsida
- Subclass: Polypodiidae; Cronquist, Takht. & W.Zimm.

Orders
- Cyatheales; Gleicheniales; Hymenophyllales; Osmundales; Polypodiales; Salviniales; Schizaeales

= Leptosporangiate fern =

Leptosporangiate fern Temporal range: Early Carboniferous to Recent (Mississippian-Holocene), 358.9–0 Ma

Subclass of ferns

The Polypodiidae, commonly called leptosporangiate ferns, formerly Leptosporangiatae, are one of four subclasses of ferns, the largest of these being the largest group of living ferns, including some 11,000 species worldwide. The group has also been treated as the class Pteridopsida or Polypodiopsida, although other classifications assign them a different rank. Older names for the group include Filicidae and Filicales, although at least the "water ferns" (now the Salviniales) were then treated separately.

The leptosporangiate ferns are one of the four major groups of ferns, with the other three being the eusporangiate ferns comprising the marattioid ferns (Marattiidae, Marattiaceae), the horsetails (Equisetiidae, Equisetaceae), and whisk ferns and moonworts. There are approximately 8465 species of living leptosporangiate ferns, compared with about 2070 for all other ferns, totalling 10535 species of ferns. Almost a third of leptosporangiate fern species are epiphytes.

These ferns are called leptosporangiate because their sporangia arise from a single epidermal cell and not from a group of cells as in eusporangiate ferns (a polyphyletic lineage). The mature sporangia have a wall that is just a single cell thick, and are typically covered with a scale called the indusium, which can cover the whole sorus, forming a ring or cup around the sorus, or can also be strongly reduced to completely absent. Many leptosporangiate ferns have an annulus around the sporangium, which ejects the spores.

== Taxonomy ==
The leptosporangiate ferns were first recognized as a group, the "Leptosporangiateen", by Karl Ritter von Goebel in 1881, who placed the eusporangiate ferns with seed plants and vascular plants into a coeval "Eusporangiateen". As this classification artificially split the ferns, Christian Luerssen subdivided the homosporous ferns only into Eusporangiatae and Leptosporangiatae in 1884–9. The latter group was treated at a variety of ranks in subsequent systems of classification. The subclass "Polypodiidae" was first published and used for the homosporous leptosporangiate ferns by Cronquist, Takhtajan and Zimmermann in 1966, typified on Polypodium L.. Other contemporary classifications used the name "Filicidae" for this subclass.

Smith et al. (2006) carried out the first higher-level classification of ferns based on molecular phylogenetics. They included heterosporous water ferns (Salviniales) (placed in a separate subclass by Cronquist et al. due to their highly modified morphology) within the leptosporangiate ferns, which they elevated to the rank of class as the Polypodiopsida (published by Cronquist et al. to include all ferns).

The common ancestor of Salviniales, Cyatheales and Polypodiales went through a whole genome duplication.

Later classifications renamed the group Polypodiidae, initially as a subclass of Equisetopsida sensu lato. This subclass comprises leptosporangiate ferns as opposed to the remaining three subclasses which are informally referred to as eusporangiate ferns. The following diagram shows a likely phylogenic relationship between subclass Polypodiidae and the other Equisetopsida subclasses in that system

- Equisetopsida
  - - - - - - - - Marchantiidae
  - - - - - - - - Bryidae
    - - - - - - - Anthocerotidae
      - - - - - - Lycopodiidae
        - - - - - Equisetidae
              - - Marattiidae
              - - Ophioglossidae
              - - Polypodiidae
          - - - - Cycadidae
                - Ginkgoidae
              - - Gnetidae
                - Pinidae
            - - - Magnoliidae

In 2014, Christenhusz and Chase grouped all the fern subclasses together as Polypodiophyta and in 2016 the Pteridophyte Phylogeny Group (PPG) adopted the class Polypodiopsida sensu lato for the four fern subclasses. The following cladogram shows the phylogenic relationship between the subclasses according to the PPG. The first three small subclasses being informally grouped as eusporangiate ferns, in contrast to the Polypodiidae or leptosporangiate ferns. Polypodiidae is shown as a sister group of Marattiidae.

- Polypodiopsida
  - Equisetidae
  - - Ophioglossidae
    - - Marattiidae
      - Polypodiidae

=== Subdivision ===
In both the Christenhusz and Chase, and the PPG classification, the extant Polypodiidae are divided into seven orders, 44 families, 300 genera, and an estimated 10,323 species.

Christenhusz and Chase 2014

- Polypodiidae
  - Osmundales 1 family
  - - Hymenophyllales 1 family
    - - Gleicheniales 3 families
      - - Schizaeales 3 families
        - - Salviniales 2 families
          - - Cyatheales 8 families
            - Polypodiales 6 suborders, 26 families

Nitta et al. 2022 and Fern Tree of life

- - Osmundales
  - - Hymenophyllales
    - - Gleicheniales
      - - Schizaeales
        - - - Salviniales
            - Cyatheales
          - Polypodiales

=== Phylogenetic relationships ===
The following phylogram shows a likely relationship between the other vascular plant classes and the leptosporangiate ferns. It was formerly unclear about the relationship between Equisetopsida, Psilotopsida, and Marattiopsida, but recent studies have shown that Equisetopsida is most likely sister to Psilotopsida.

- Tracheophyta
  - Lycopodiophytes (club mosses, spike mosses, quillworts)
  - Euphyllophytes
    - Spermatophytes (seed plants)
    - Ferns
      - - Equisetopsida
          - Equisetales (horsetails)
        - Psilotopsida
          - Ophioglossales (grapeferns etc.)
          - Psilotales (whisk ferns)
      - - Marattiopsida
          - Marattiales
        - Polypodiopsida
          - Osmundales
          - - Hymenophyllales (filmy ferns)
            - - Gleicheniales
              - - Schizaeales
                - - Salviniales (heterosporous)
                  - - Cyatheales (tree ferns)
                    - Polypodiales

== Discussion of molecular classification ==
There has been some challenge to recent molecular studies, claiming that these provide a skewed view of the phylogenetic order because they do not take into account fossil representatives. However, the molecular studies have clarified relations among families that had already been thought to be polyphyletic before the advent of molecular information but that were left in their polyphyletic ranks because there was not enough information to do otherwise. The classification of ferns using these molecular studies, which have generally supported one another, reflects the best information available at present, because traditional morphological characters are not always informative in elucidating evolutionary relationships among ferns.

== Extinct families ==
The leptosporangiate ferns have a substantial fossil record. For example, fossils assigned to the Dicksoniaceae, a member of the Cyatheales, are known from the Lower Jurassic (201 to 175 million years ago). A number of other extinct families have been described. They are not included in the classification systems used for extant ferns, and so most cannot be assigned to orders used in these systems. Taylor et al. (2009) use the order "Filicales", which corresponds to four Polypodiidae orders in more modern systems: Hymenophyllales, Gleicheniales, Schizaeales and Cyatheales. The unplaced families include:

- Anachoropteridaceae
- Botryopteridaceae
- Kaplanopteridaceae
- Psalixochlaenaceae
- Sermayaceae
- Skaaripteridaceae
- Tedeleaceae
- Tempskyaceae

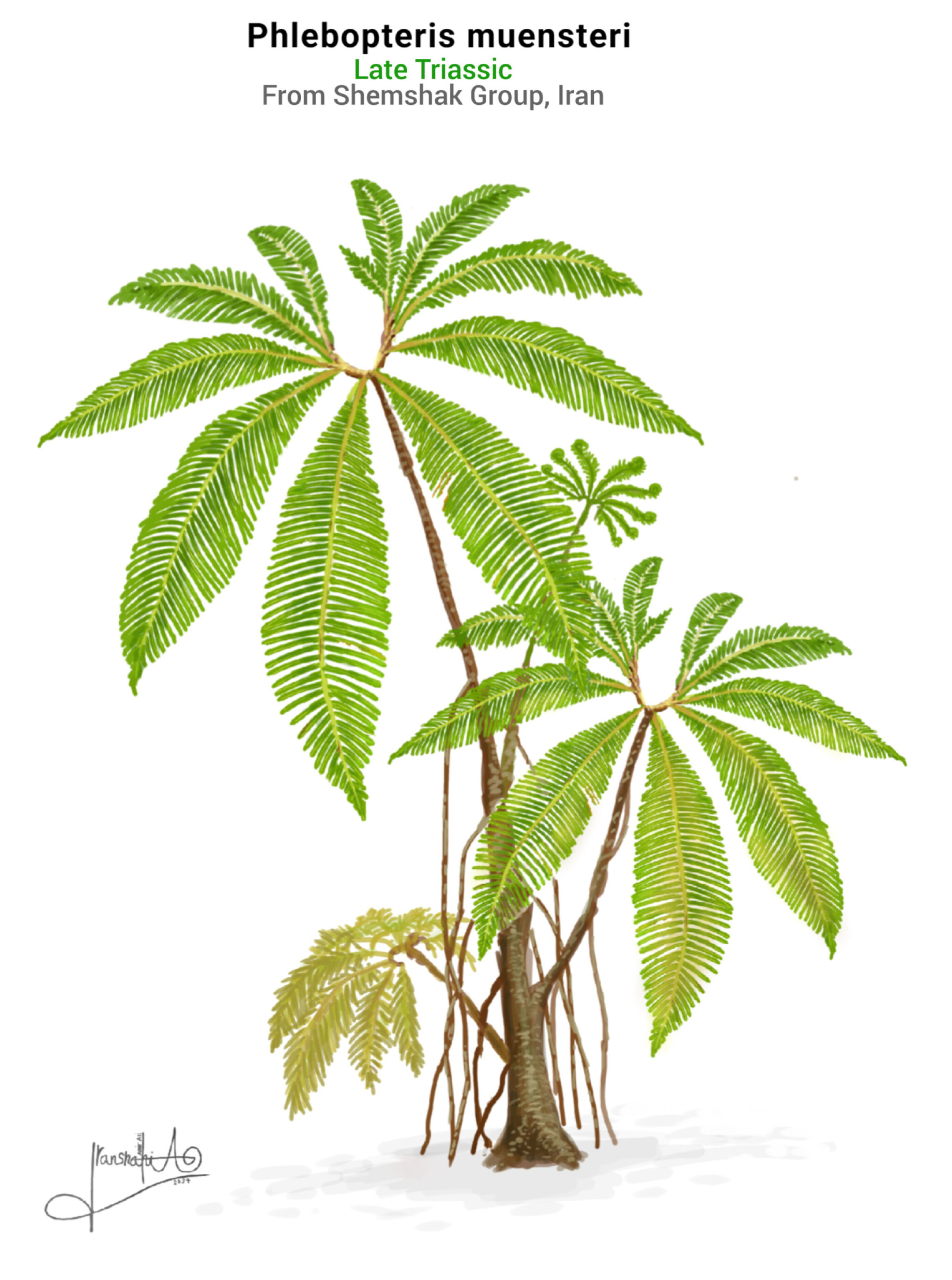
Phlebopteris muensteri life restoration

== Bibliography ==
- Chase, Mark W.; Reveal, James L. (2009). "A phylogenetic classification of the land plants to accompany APG III". Botanical Journal of the Linnean Society. 161 (2): 122–127. doi:10.1111/j.1095-8339.2009.01002.x.
- Christenhusz, M.J.M.; Zhang, X.C.; Schneider, H. (18 February 2011). "A linear sequence of extant families and genera of lycophytes and ferns". Phytotaxa. 19 (1): 7. Bibcode:2011Phytx..19....7C. doi:10.11646/phytotaxa.19.1.2. hdl:10138/28042.
- Christenhusz, Maarten J.M.; Chase, Mark W. (2014). "Trends and concepts in fern classification". Annals of Botany. 113 (4): 571–594. doi:10.1093/aob/mct299. PMC 3936591. PMID 24532607.
- Pteridophyte Phylogeny Group (November 2016). "A community-derived classification for extant lycophytes and ferns". Journal of Systematics and Evolution. 54 (6): 563–603. Bibcode:2016JSyEv..54..563.. doi:10.1111/jse.12229. S2CID 39980610.
- Smith, Alan R.; Pryer, Kathleen M.; Schuettpelz, Eric; Korall, Petra; Schneider, Harald; Wolf, Paul G. (2006). "A classification for extant ferns" (PDF). Taxon. 55 (3): 705–731. Bibcode:2006Taxon..55..705S. doi:10.2307/25065646. JSTOR 25065646.
- Taylor, T.N.; Taylor, E.L. & Krings, M. (2009). Paleobotany, The Biology and Evolution of Fossil Plants (2nd ed.). Amsterdam; Boston: Academic Press. ISBN 978-0-12-373972-8.
