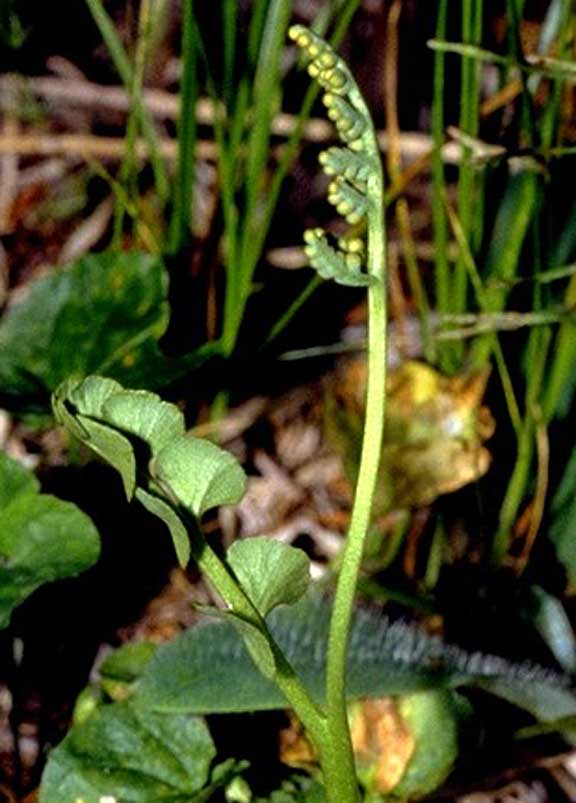
- Botrychium lunaria

Scientific classification
- Kingdom: Plantae
- Clade: Embryophytes
- Clade: Tracheophytes
- Division: Polypodiophyta
- Class: Polypodiopsida

Groups included
- Ophioglossidae; Equisetidae; Marattiidae

Excluded
- Polypodiidae

= Eusporangiate fern =

Common name for a group of ferns

Eusporangiate ferns are vascular spore plants, whose sporangia arise from several epidermal cells and not from a single cell as in leptosporangiate ferns. Typically these ferns have reduced root systems and sporangia that produce large amounts of spores (up to 7000 spores per sporangium in Christensenia).

There are four extant eusporangiate fern families, distributed among three classes. Each family is assigned to its own order.

- Class Psilotopsida
  - Order Psilotales, family Psilotaceae – Whisk ferns (2 genera, about 17 species)
  - Order Ophioglossales, family Ophioglossaceae – Adder's-tongues (5 genera, about 80 species)
- Class Equisetopsida
  - Order Equisetales, family Equisetaceae – Horsetails (1 genus, about 15 species)
- Class Marattiopsida
  - Order Marattiales, family Marattiaceae – Marattoid ferns (6 genera, about 500 species)

The following diagram shows a likely phylogenic placement of eusporangiate fern classes within the vascular plants.

- - lycophytes (club mosses, spike mosses, quillworts)
  - euphyllophytes
    - spermatophytes (seed plants)
    - ferns
      - Equisetopsida
        - Equisetales (horsetails)
      - Marattiopsida
        - Marattiales
      - Psilotopsida
        - Ophioglossales (grapeferns etc.)
        - Psilotales (whisk ferns)
      - Polypodiopsida
        - Osmundales
        - - Hymenophyllales
          - - Gleicheniales
            - - Schizaeales
              - - Salviniales
                - - Cyatheales
                  - Polypodiales

== Cladistics ==
While it is generally accepted that the leptosporangiate ferns are monophyletic, it is considered to be likely that the eusporangiate ferns, as a group, are paraphyletic. In each of the three examples from recently published studies, shown in the following table, it can be seen that, together, the four eusporangiate fern families do not form a single clade.

Pryer & Schuettpelz, 2009

- ferns
  - - - Ophioglossaceae
      - Psilotaceae
  - - - Equisetaceae
      - Marattiaceae
    - - Leptosporangiate
        ferns

Rai & Graham, 2010

- ferns
  - - - Equisetaceae
  - - - Ophioglossaceae
      - Psilotaceae
    - - Marattiaceae
      - Leptosporangiate
        ferns

Lehtonen, 2011

- ferns
  - - - Ophioglossaceae
      - Psilotaceae
  - - - Marattiaceae
    - - Equisetaceae
      - Leptosporangiate
        ferns
