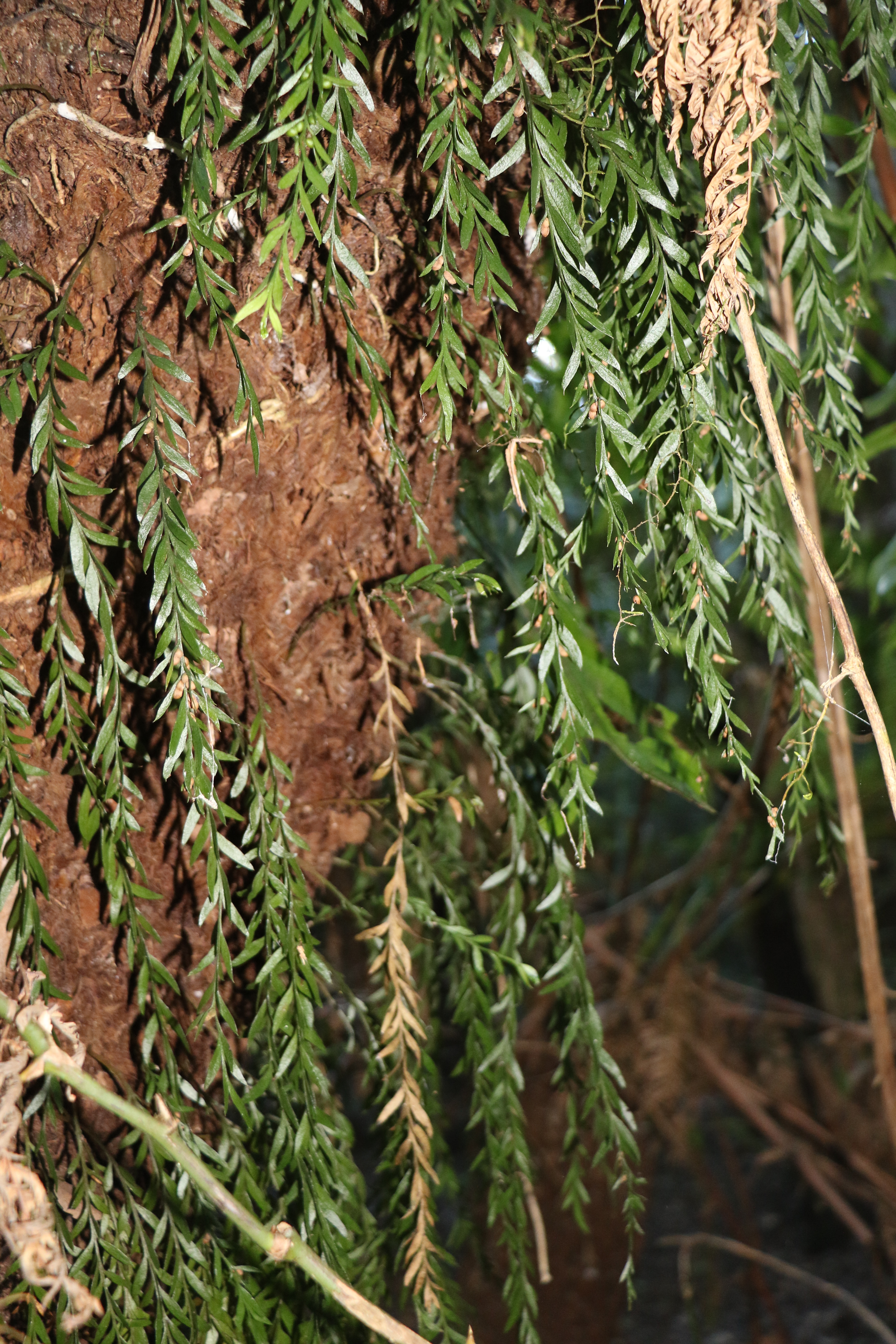
- T. obliqua growing on a Dicksonia antarctica

Scientific classification
- Kingdom: Plantae
- Clade: Tracheophytes
- Division: Polypodiophyta
- Class: Polypodiopsida
- Order: Psilotales
- Family: Psilotaceae
- Genus: Tmesipteris
- Species: T. obliqua

Binomial name
- Tmesipteris obliqua Chinnock

= Tmesipteris obliqua =

Long fork fern

Species of plant

Tmesipteris obliqua, more commonly known as the long fork-fern or common fork-fern, is a weeping, epiphytic fern ally with narrow unbranched leafy stems. T. obliqua is a member of the genus Tmesipteris, commonly known as hanging fork-ferns. Tmesipteris is one of two genera in the order Psilotales, the other genus being Psilotum. T. obliqua is endemic to eastern Australia.

== Anatomy and biology ==
T. obliqua is a weeping, epiphytic fern ally that grows on trunks of tree ferns, such as Dicksonia antarctica and some rocky surfaces. Fronds of T. obliqua are unbranched and grow to 20–65 cm (7.9–25.6 in) in length. T. obliqua has a thick fleshy rhizome but no true roots. This rhizome is brittle and resents disturbance. The stems are usually without branches and smooth at the base, except for a single groove on the upper surface of the lower section of stem.

Leaves are oblong in shape, sometimes broad as well, and are roughly 20–30 mm (0.79–1.18 in) in length, 4–8 mm wide. Leaves are not crowded (c. 3 per cm), are asymmetrical at the base and apex truncate with a fine excurrent point. Leaves reduce in size towards apex of stem (younger parts of the plant are smaller).

T. obliqua are non-flowering and spore forming. Sporangia are borne in pointed 2-chambered capsules at the base of specialized forked bracts, which are narrower and shorter than sterile leaves.

It has been discovered that Tmesipteris obliqua has the largest known fern genome (1C = 150.61 pg). Its genome size was estimated by flow cytometry in comparison with the genome of Paris japonica (Melanthiaceae; 1C = 152.23 pg), the largest genome so far reported for any eukaryote. This discovery has shown a double in genome size compared to genome size values previously encountered in ferns.

== Distribution and habitat ==
Tmesipteris obliqua is an epiphyte commonly found growing on the trunks of tree-ferns, especially the soft tree-fern, Dicksonia antarctica and occasionally shady, moist rock-faces.

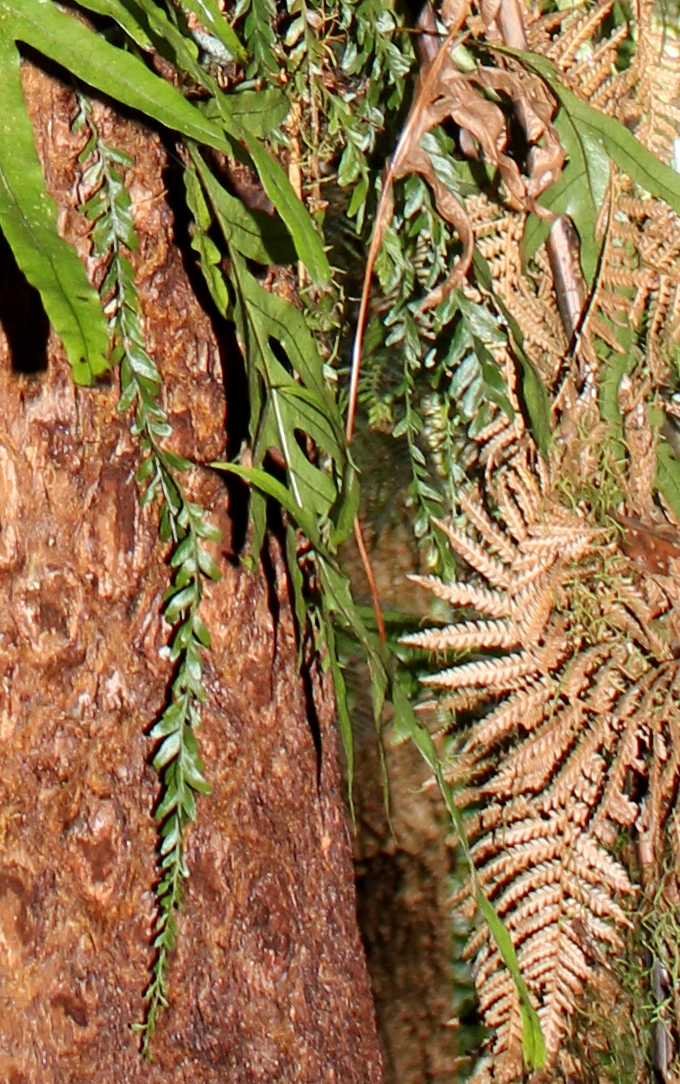

This species is widespread and common from sea level up to 600 m (2,000 ft) in communities of fern gullies, rainforests and wet sclerophyll forests. T. obliqua thrives in moist, shady, humid and rocky environments and soil tolerances include mossy logs, rock or soil amongst exposed roots.

T. obliqua is most commonly found distributed along eastern Australia.

== Cultivation ==
Due to its epiphytic nature, T. obliqua grows best in areas of high rainfall, large amounts of shade and some humidity in communities with rocky surfaces. These very specific growth requirements, plus the delicacy of the species, makes it extremely difficult for cultivation.
