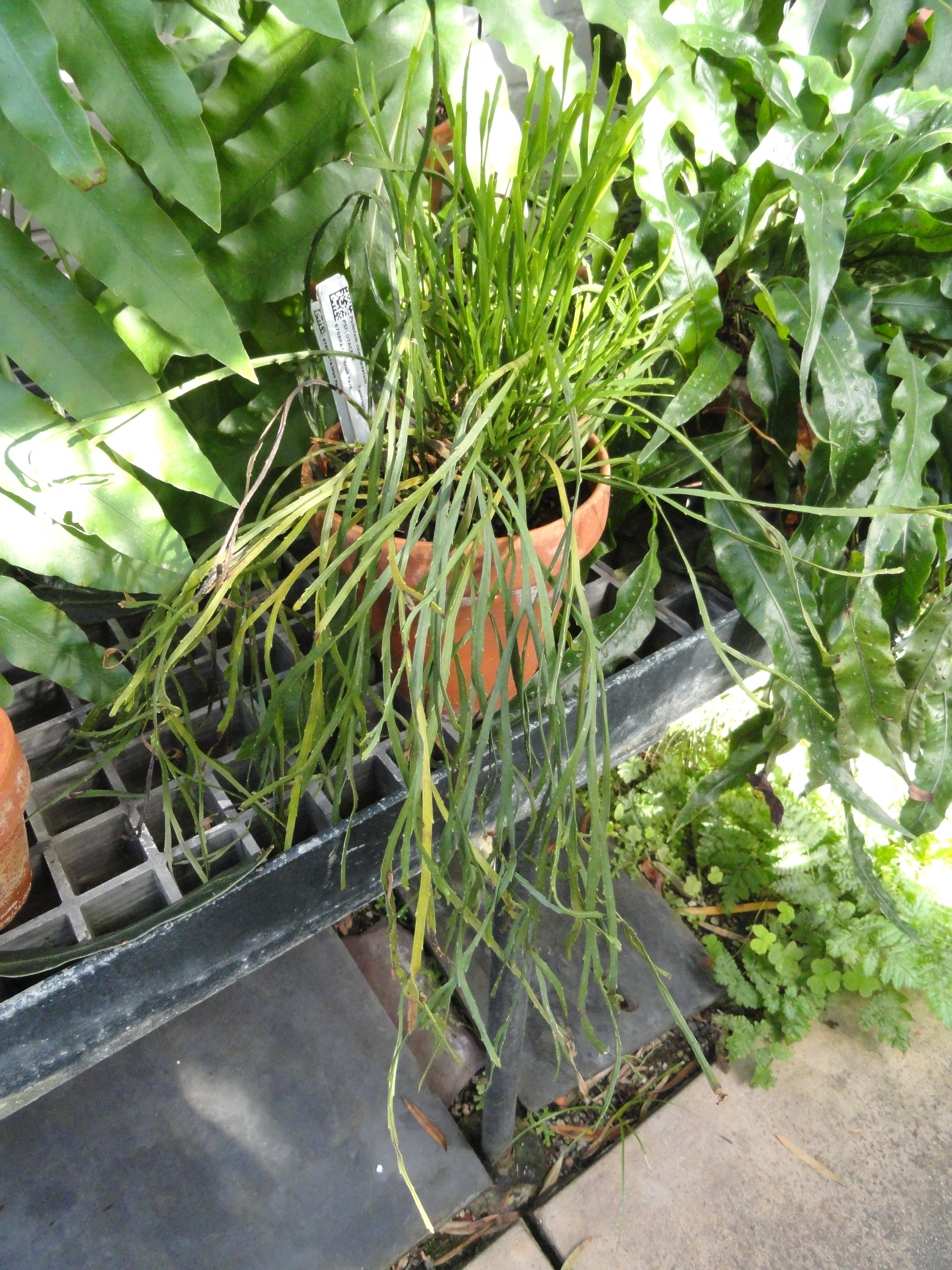

Conservation status
- Apparently Secure (NatureServe)

Scientific classification
- Kingdom: Plantae
- Clade: Tracheophytes
- Division: Polypodiophyta
- Class: Polypodiopsida
- Order: Psilotales
- Family: Psilotaceae
- Genus: Psilotum
- Species: P. complanatum

Binomial name
- Psilotum complanatum Sw.

= Psilotum complanatum =

Species of fern in the family Psilotaceae

Psilotum complanatum, the flatfork fern, is a rare herbaceous epiphytic fern ally in the genus Psilotum. There is some evidence that it might be a true fern that has lost some typically fern-like characteristics. Morphologically, the plant is simple, lacking leaves and roots, and having hanging stems with dichotomous branching, which lack developed leaves but have minute scales. The stems and branches have protostele, with a triangular-shaped core of xylem. The scales are arranged in two rows along the flat stems and branches. The stems are broadly triangular in cross section and 5 mm wide. The branches are 1.5 to 2 mm wide. P. complanatum grows 10 to 75 cm (3.9 to 29.5 in) long and stems branch in pairs a number of times up their length and are covered with brownish colored hair-like rhizoids. Small stalks end with simple sporangia from the axils of minute bifid, rounded sporophylls. Bean shaped, monolete spores are produced. The spores germinate best in a dark environment when ammonium is present. The gametophyte is non-photosynthetic, living in association with a fungus for its nutritional needs. Plants grow from a subterranean rhizome which anchors the plant in place and absorbs nutrients by means of filament like rhizoids.

Some botanists believe P. complanatum is a survivor from a very primitive lineage of fern-like vascular plants.

Psilotum complanatum lives in moist evergreen forests on the Malay Peninsula, Australia, Fiji islands, Mexico, Hawaii and South America. In India it is reported only from the Nicobar group of islands. Plants are typically found hanging from the trunks of trees or other epiphytic plant species.

== Taxonomy ==
This species has long been known as Psilotum complanatum, described by Olof Swartz in 1801. However, in 2024, Swartz's type material was shown to be of a hybrid between the fertile species with flat branches and P. nudum. The oldest name for the flat-branched species is P. flaccidum, first described in 1831.
