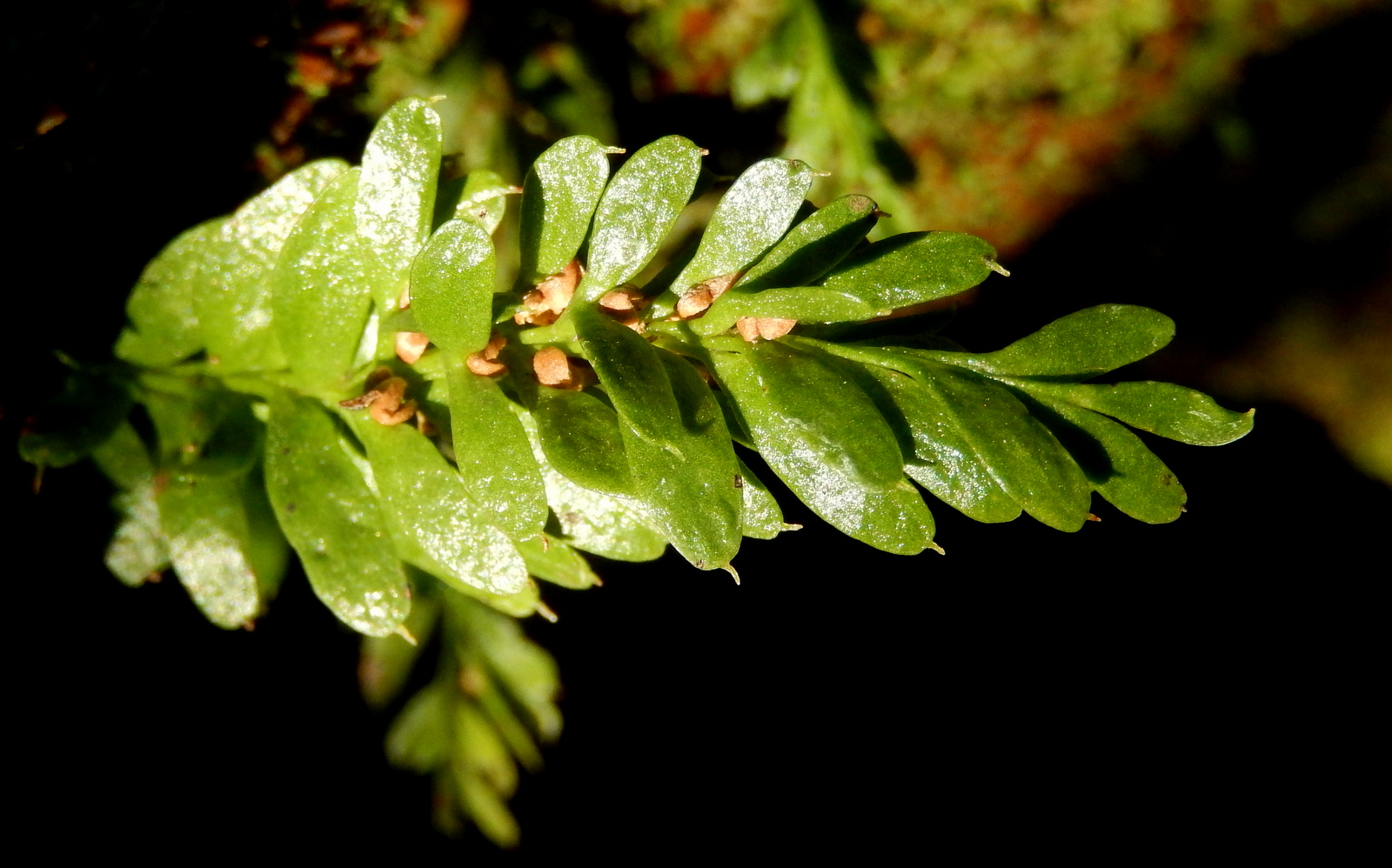
- Growing on a Todea barbara

Scientific classification
- Kingdom: Plantae
- Clade: Embryophytes
- Clade: Tracheophytes
- Division: Polypodiophyta
- Class: Polypodiopsida
- Order: Psilotales
- Family: Psilotaceae
- Genus: Tmesipteris
- Species: T. ovata

Binomial name
- Tmesipteris ovata N.A.Wakef.

= Tmesipteris ovata =

Species of fern

Tmesipteris ovata is a fern ally endemic to eastern Australia. The habitat of this primitive plant is on tree ferns in rainforests.
