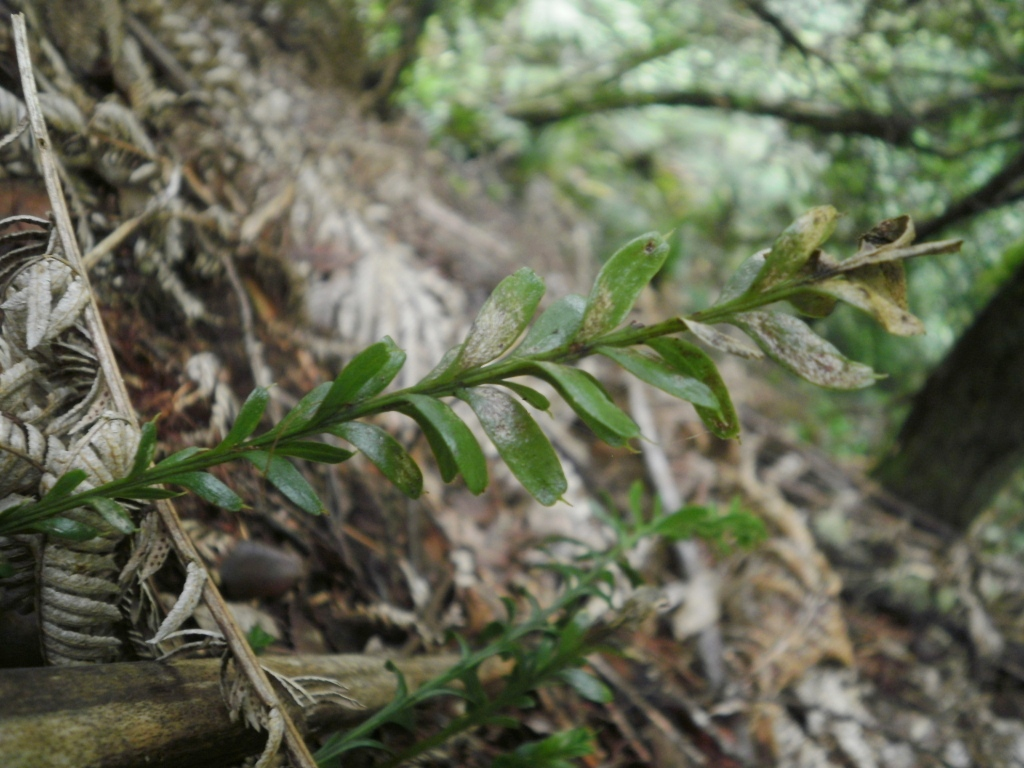

Scientific classification
- Kingdom: Plantae
- Clade: Tracheophytes
- Division: Polypodiophyta
- Class: Polypodiopsida
- Order: Psilotales
- Family: Psilotaceae
- Genus: Tmesipteris
- Species: T. tannensis

Binomial name
- Tmesipteris tannensis (Spreng.) Bernh.

= Tmesipteris tannensis =

Species of fern

Tmesipteris tannensis is a fern ally endemic to New Zealand. It is usually epiphytic on trees and tree ferns, but is occasionally terrestrial.

An example of occurrence of T. tannensis within a tiered phytocoenosis is in Central Westland of South Island, New Zealand. These forests are the most extensive continuous podocarp/broadleaf forests in New Zealand. The overstory includes miro, rimu and mountain tōtara. The mid-story includes tree ferns such as Cyathea smithii and Dicksonia squarrosa, whilst the lowest tier and epiphytic associates include Asplenium polyodon, Astelia solandri and Blechnum discolor along with T. tannensis.

== Sources ==
- Robert J. Chinnock (1976). "The identification, typification and origin of Tmesipteris tannensis (Psilotaceae)". Taxon. 25 (1). Taxon, Vol. 25, No. 1: 115–121. doi:10.2307/1220418. JSTOR 1220418.
- C. Michael Hogan. 2009. Crown Fern: Blechnum discolor, Globaltwitcher.com, ed. N. Stromberg
