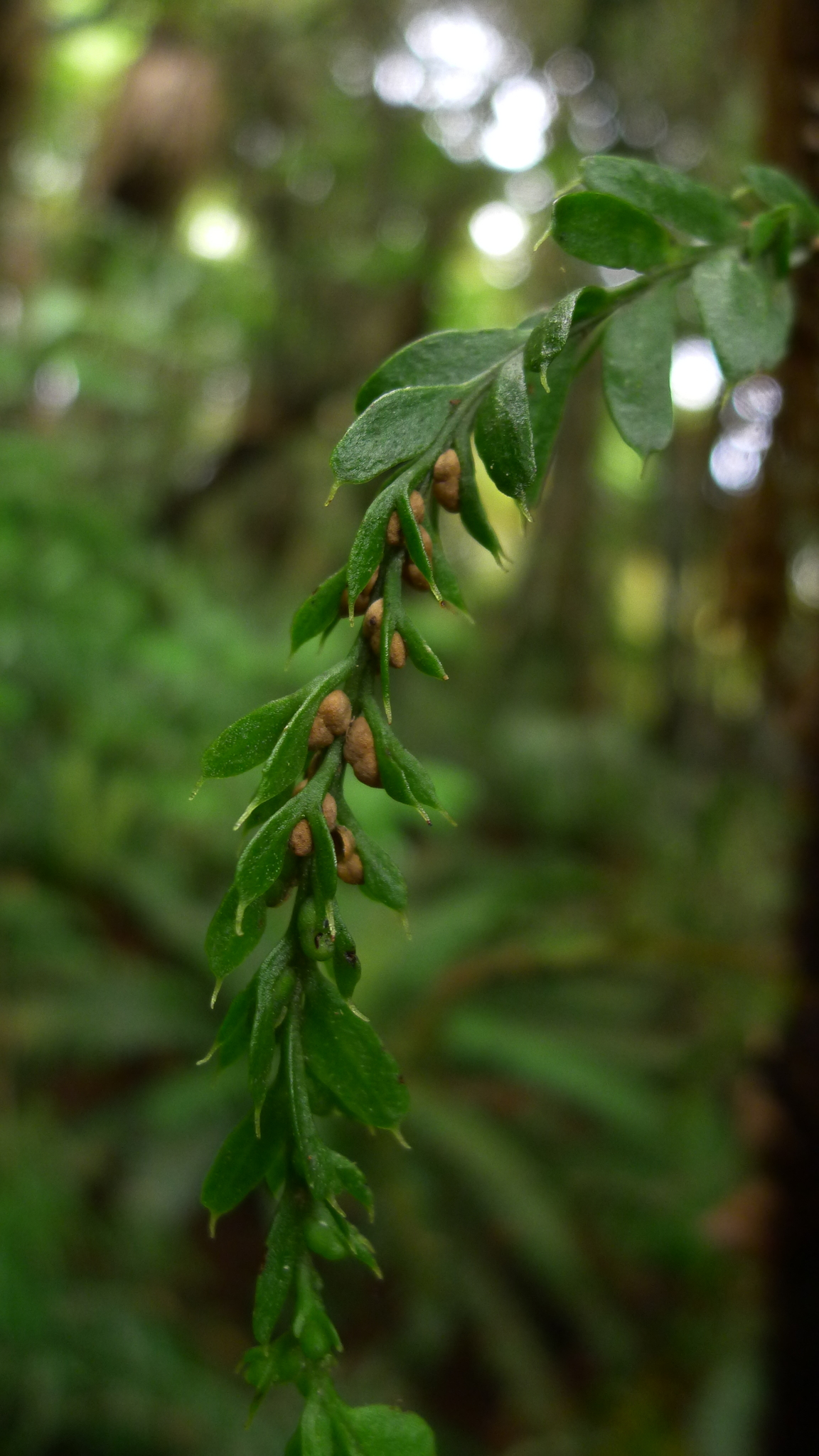

Scientific classification
- Kingdom: Plantae
- Clade: Embryophytes
- Clade: Tracheophytes
- Division: Polypodiophyta
- Class: Polypodiopsida
- Order: Psilotales
- Family: Psilotaceae
- Genus: Tmesipteris
- Species: T. horomaka

Binomial name
- Tmesipteris horomaka Perrie, Brownsey, et Lovis

= Tmesipteris horomaka =

Species of plant

Tmesipteris horomaka, commonly known as the Banks Peninsula fork fern, is a fern ally endemic to New Zealand.

== Description ==
Tmesipteris horomaka is usually found on the stem of the tree ferns, i.e., an epiphytic fern. It is also found on the ground, or in soil from decomposing logs, i.e., a terrestrial fern. Many stems of Tmesipteris horomaka can be found on a single fern tree, but it is hard to tell whether they belong to single individual fern, as Tmesipteris plants have creeping rootstock from which various shoots may arise. It has continuous creeping rootstock with the aerial stem growing to 60–510 mm (2.4–20.1 in) tall, with a width of 15–35 mm (0.59–1.38 in). The leaves are rounded at the apex and have a small spike, known as mucron, at the top of the leaves. The leaves grow to the 10–25 mm (0.39–0.98 in) long with a width of 2.5–6.5 mm. The structure of this species is somewhat in between of T. elongata and T. tannensis. The difference between T. horomaka and T. tannensis is that of the placement of the spore-producing synangia, and it differs from T. elongata by having a truncate leaf with a notch at the apex of the leaves. Tmesipteris horomaka is further differentiated from that of its parent by its spore size - both parents are tetraploid while T. horomaka is octoploid.

== Habitat ==
Tmesipteris horomaka is an epiphyte in nature. It is usually found hanging from the trunks of tree ferns, or trees, for infrastructure and support. The initial observation of T. horomaka was as an epiphyte around the stem of a tree fern; however, a sample which came from Port Hills registered it to be found on the decaying matter of harakeke which was on the southeast cliff face. The tree ferns that can host T. horomaka are Cyathea dealbata, C. smithii, and Dicksonia squarrosa. These grow in podocarp, broadleaved, and beech forest. So far T. horomaka has only been found in New Zealand, with the population around the Banks Peninsula and Port Hills near Christchurch.

== Ecology ==
=== Life cycle/phenology ===
There are two distinct changes that take place during the life of a fern which belongs to a group of vascular plants, i.e., from the sporophytic phase to a gametophytic phase. The spores of the fern are haploid and are produced in an organ called a sporangium, which can be found on the leaves (fronds) of the fern. A tiny portion of the spores gets dispersed into the atmosphere due to wind current and falls in a suitable site to form a gametophyte. Fertilisation takes place when the eggs and sperm are produced on the different gametophyte, and the results are placed in the tissue of prothallium until the embryo breaks its dormancy and cell division takes place, which finally leads to the development of gametophyte.

=== Threats ===
Bio Status: Endemic

Tmesipteris horomaka is considered a threatened species by the Department of Conservation and has received support for its management. The total population of T. horomaka is less than 250 mature individuals, which brings them to the criteria of endangered species. However, this was also classified under lack of data and is currently found in only one location. As this species is newly discovered, further survey is needed. Through the preliminary population survey, the biggest threat to it is the safety and survival of its host plant.

== Other information ==
Tmesipteris horomaka was discovered when researchers Leon Perrie and Patrick Brownsey were on a survey researching the chromosome number in two species of Tmesipteris, which ended by finding a new octoploid fern on the Banks Peninsula. This species was a cross between a locally occurring species T. elengata and T. tannensis, and the characteristic of the new species was utterly different from that of its parents. The prothalli, also known as gametophytes, are hard to find. They are rarely found in the environment. This is due to the dense population of Tmesipteris, the location it grows, and the dormancy period before it grows as an individual plant.
