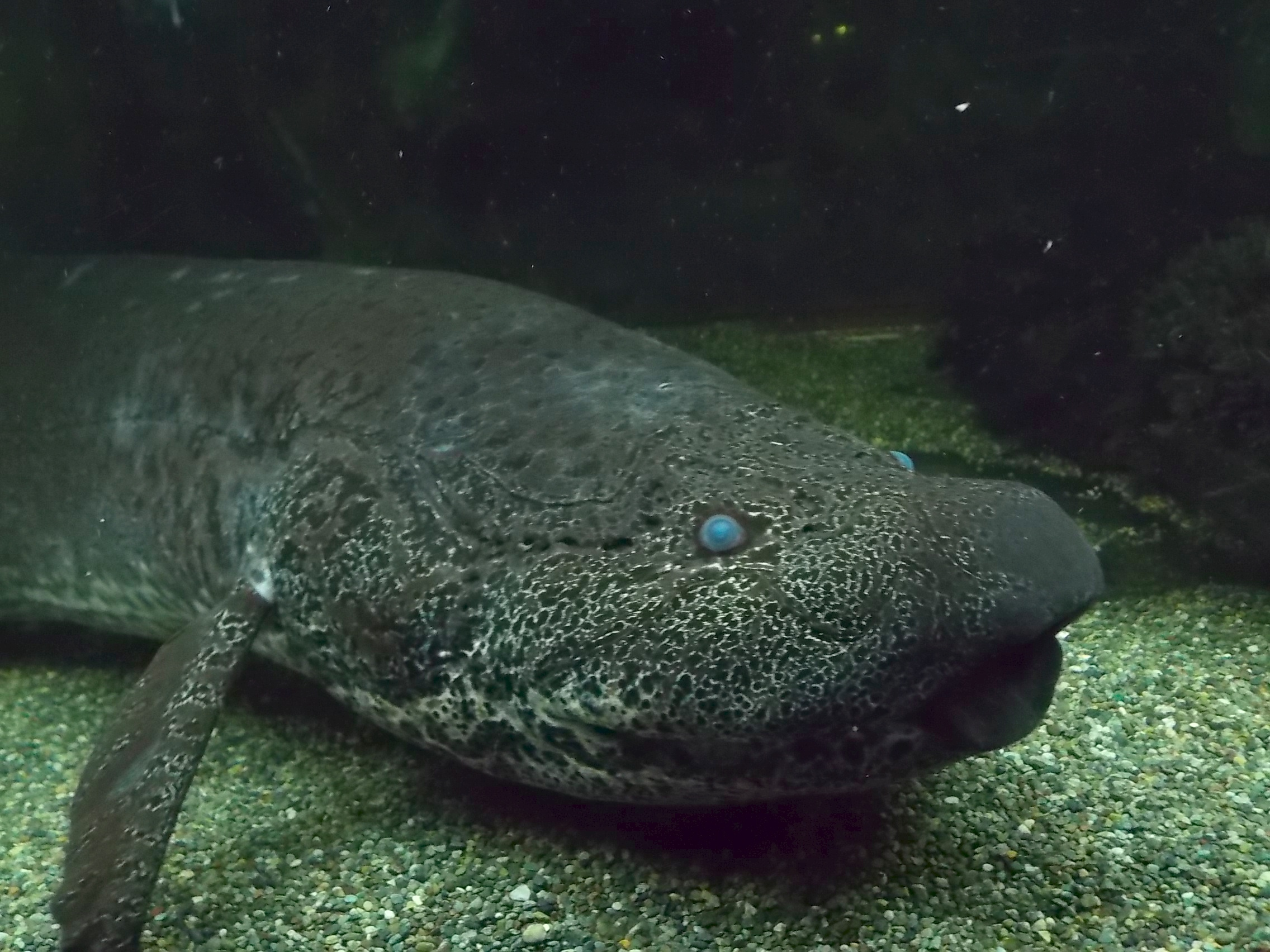

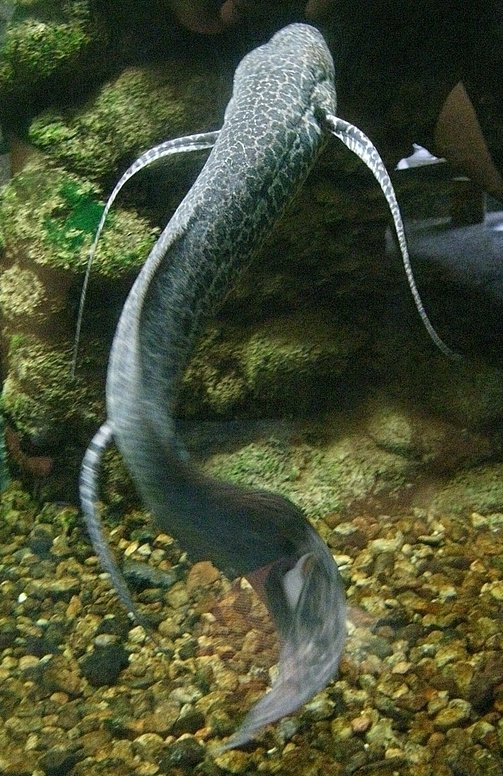
- Close-up of head (above), swimming with head at top and back turned towards camera (below)

Conservation status
- Least Concern (IUCN 3.1)

Scientific classification
- Kingdom: Animalia
- Phylum: Chordata
- Class: Dipnoi
- Order: Ceratodontiformes
- Family: Protopteridae
- Genus: Protopterus
- Species: P. aethiopicus

Binomial name
- Protopterus aethiopicus Heckel, 1851

Subspecies
- Protopterus aethiopicus aethiopicus Heckel, 1851; Protopterus aethiopicus congicus Poll 1961; Protopterus aethiopicus mesmaekersi Poll 1961
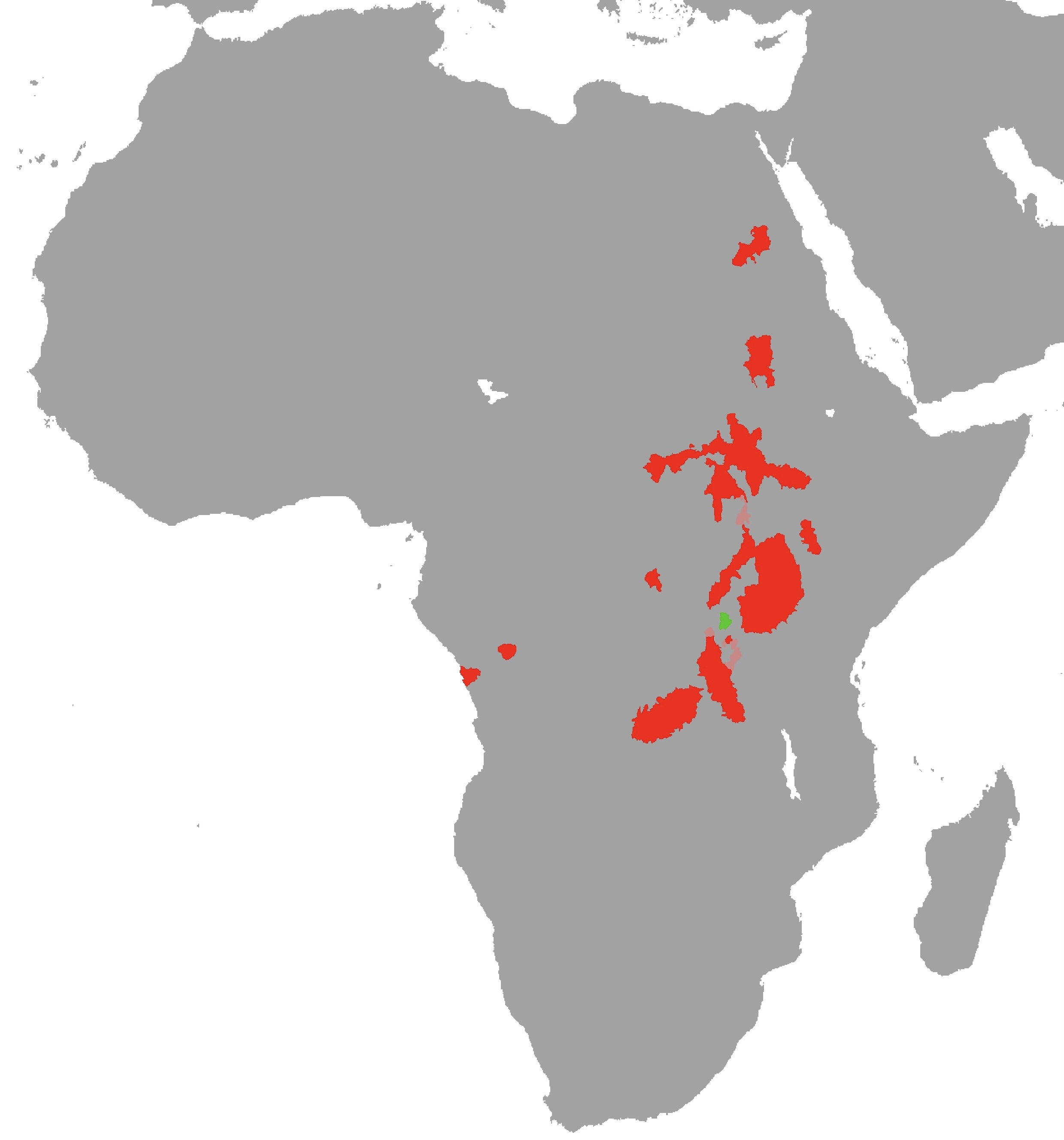
- Red:extant, Light red: possibly extant, Green: introduced

Synonyms
- Lepidosiren arnaudii de Castelnau 1855

= Marbled lungfish =

Marbled lungfish Temporal range: 7.246–Present Ma

Species of fish

The marbled lungfish (Protopterus aethiopicus) is a lungfish of the family Protopteridae. Also known as the leopard lungfish, it is found in Eastern and Central Africa, as well as the Nile region. At 133 billion base pairs, it has the largest known genome of any animal and one of the largest of any organism, along with the flowering plant Paris japonica, the fern Tmesipteris oblanceolata and the protist Polychaos dubium at 150 billion, 160 billion and 670 billion, respectively.

The marbled lungfish is caught in large numbers throughout much of its range, including several hundred tonnes per year in Mwanza Region's Mwanza Gulf of Lake Victoria alone. It is mostly a food fish, although this varies depending on the exact community, with some recognizing it as a delicacy and others strongly disliking its taste or considering it as a taboo to eat it. In some regions, parts of this fish are used as traditional medicine.

== Description ==
The marbled lungfish is smooth, elongated, and cylindrical with deeply embedded scales. The tail is very long and has tapers at the end. They can reach a length of up to 2 m (6.6 ft). The pectoral and pelvic fins are also very long and thin, almost spaghetti-like, used for gliding through the water. The newly hatched young have branched external gills much like those of newts. After two to three months, the young metamorphose into the adult form, losing their external gills for gill openings. These fish have a yellowish gray or pinkish-toned ground color with dark slate-gray splotches, creating a marbling or leopard effect over their bodies and fins. The color pattern is darker along the top and lighter below. It was once believed that marbled lungfish are obligate air breathers, however, research published in 2007 suggests that the marbled lungfish primarily relies on aquatic respiration unless restricted by certain ecological or physiological conditions.

== Distribution and habitat ==
Protopterus aethiopicus is found in the African countries of Angola, Burundi, Egypt, Ethiopia, the Democratic Republic of Congo, Kenya, Republic of the Congo, Rwanda, South Sudan, Sudan, Tanzania, Uganda and Zambia. Among others, it lives in the Nile and Congo River basins, including lakes such as Albert, Edward, Tanganyika, Victoria, Nabugabo, Turkana, No and Kyoga. Different subspecies are found in different areas: P. a. aethiopicus lives in the Nile basin and its lakes like Victoria and Tanganyika, P. a. congicus in the middle and upper Congo River, and P. a. mesmaekersi in the lower Congo.

Adult marbled lungfish live in swamps, riverbeds, floodplains, and river deltas throughout its range. The juvenile members of the species often live in between the roots of papyrus plants. Despite being aquatic, adult marbled lungfish can live in riverbeds and other areas that have no rain for portions of the year due to their ability to estivate or burrow in the ground to form an air bubble and breathe out of a hole in the cocoon thus formed.

== Reproduction ==
Breeding generally occurs during flood season, during which time males prepare a pit nest. One or more females may use the same pit nest, into which they lay their eggs. The female(s) then leaves the nest and the male guards the nest from attack for the next 8 weeks; in addition, he regularly fills the nest with air to ensure that the newly-laid eggs survive. Research experiments conducted on marbled lungfish in Lake Baringo, Kenya, Africa reveal that the marbled lungfish actually reproduce regularly throughout the year as observed by the presence of lungfish in all maturity stages in all monthly samples. Additionally, based on the growth trajectories from R. Dunbarck's experiments suggests that overall, the marbled lungfish have a low reproductive effort and reach maturity around the age of 3 years.

== Diet ==
The diet of adults consists largely of mollusks, such as Mutela bourguignati. They also eat small fish and insects at times; the diet of juveniles consists almost entirely of insects.
