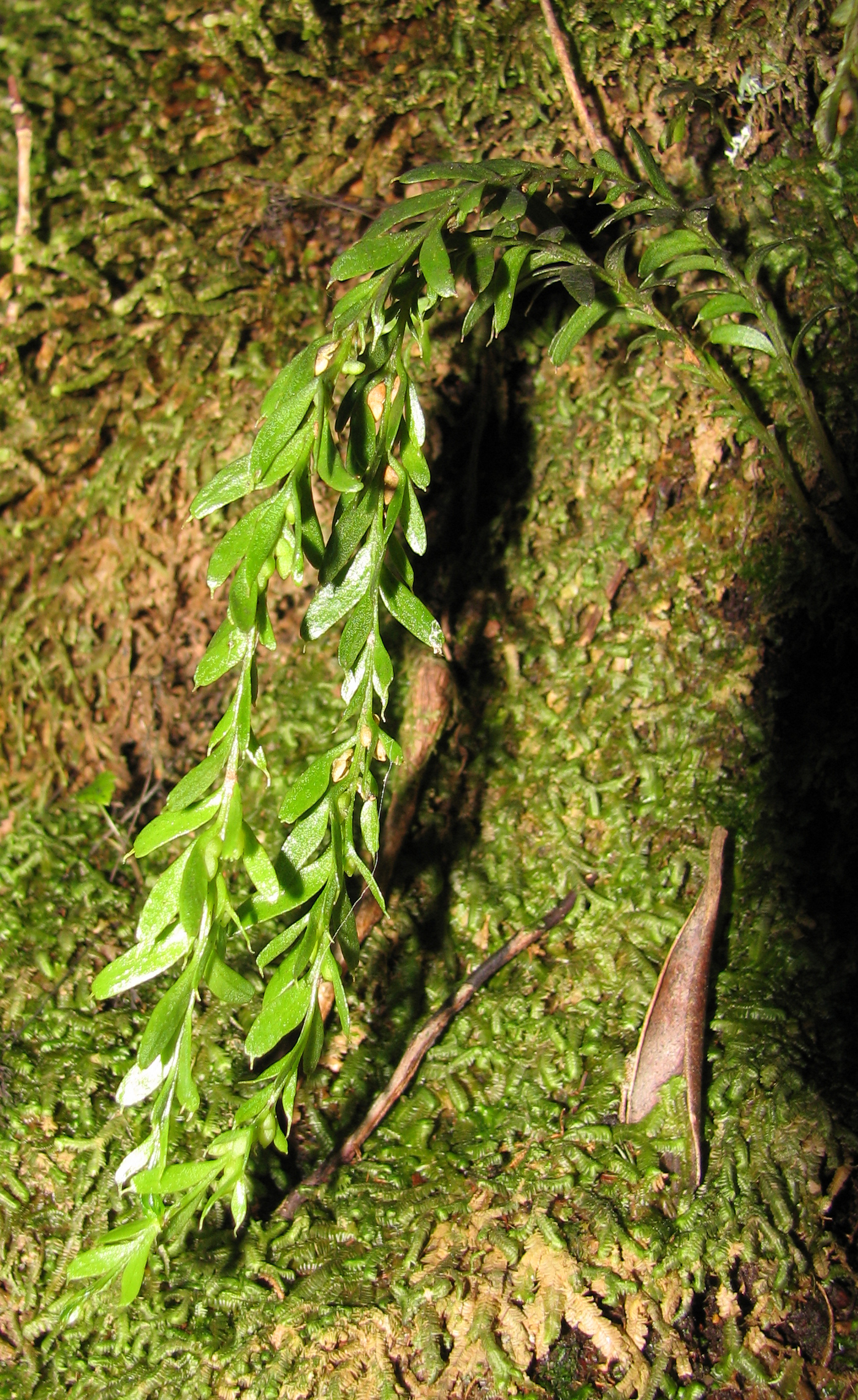
- Near Otira, New Zealand

Scientific classification
- Kingdom: Plantae
- Clade: Embryophytes
- Clade: Tracheophytes
- Division: Polypodiophyta
- Class: Polypodiopsida
- Order: Psilotales
- Family: Psilotaceae
- Genus: Tmesipteris
- Species: T. elongata

Binomial name
- Tmesipteris elongata P.A.Dang.

= Tmesipteris elongata =

Species of fern

Tmesipteris elongata is a fern endemic to south eastern Australia and New Zealand. Often seen growing on soft tree ferns in moist valleys. It was first described by Pierre Augustin Dangeard in 1891. In Victoria, Australia, it is considered critically endangered.
