= Tmesipteris alticola =

Scientific classification
- Kingdom: Plantae
- Clade: Embryophytes
- Clade: Tracheophytes
- Division: Polypodiophyta
- Class: Polypodiopsida
- Order: Psilotales
- Family: Psilotaceae
- Genus: Tmesipteris
- Species: T. alticola

Binomial name
- Tmesipteris alticola Perrie & Brownsey

Species of fern

Tmesipteris alticola is a species of fern in the family Psilotaceae. Tmesipteris alticola was formally described by Leon R. Perrie and Patrick J. Brownsey in 2023.

== Physical appearance ==
The obovate leaves and conic synangia of T. alticola distinguishes it from all other species of its genus Tmesipteris. It is considered Near Threatened.

== Geography ==
It is endemic to Grande Terre, New Caledonia. Tmesipteris alticola is known only from four mountains in Province Sud: Mont Mou, Mont Humboldt, Mont Kouakoué, and Mont Ouin. They are found in Yaté and Païta.
