= Copromyxa protea =

Scientific classification
- Domain: Eukaryota
- Phylum: Amoebozoa
- Class: Tubulinea
- Order: Euamoebida
- Family: Hartmannellidae
- Genus: Copromyxa
- Species: C. protea

Binomial name
- Copromyxa protea (Fayod) Zopf

Species of amoebozoans

Copromyxa protea is a cellular slime mold belonging to the supergroup Amoebozoa. The taxonomical history of C. protea starts as Guttulina protea and ultimately ends with becoming its own genus of protists. Its morphological features like tubular mitochondrial cristae help pinpoint its placement in its supergroup, as well as its pseudopodia. The specific environments where C. protea was gathered for experimental purposes is also detailed.

== Taxonomy and taxonomic history ==
Based on physical appearance alone, C. protea was placed in Amoebozoa due to its tubular mitochondrial cristae and broad lobose pseudopodia.

More recently, sequencing of small nuclear encoded subunit ribosomal RNA genes led the genus of Copromyxa to be placed in the Amoebozoa supergroup. Within this supergroup, it was found to be in the group Tubulinea. This came across as unexpected due to the fact that this group was recorded to have no slime molds before this taxonomic distinction. Cellular slime molds were once organized into two major categories—Dictyostelia and Acrasea. C. protea fell into the latter of the two. However, further research has placed Acrasids into the supergroup Excavata, leaving C. protea to be excluded from this grouping.

Before becoming Copromyxa protea, Victor Fayod declared the name Guttulina protea for this amoeba. It was shortly changed thereafter due to Guttulina fruiting bodies having multiple cell types, while Copromyxa just consists of one. This change was founded and implemented by Friedrich Wilhelm Zopf in 1885.

It now exists within a four-species clade of Copromyxa/Hartmannella. However, Hartmannella has since been renamed to the genus Copromyxa due to the similarities of the two.

== Morphology ==
The features of C. protea that place it in Amoebozoa and Tubulinea are its tubular mitochondrial christae, monopodial amoeba measuring around 23 μm, and central nucleus.

The appearance of the sorocarp, its mature fruiting body, is white to pale yellow, reaching a height range of 300–800 μm. The sorocyst is an encysted cell of a single type found on the sorocarp. The sorocysts along the sorocarps can be arranged in a column or in more complex forms. The sorocysts themselves can be different shapes including oblong, ovoid, and angular, and they produce only one monopodial amoeba. They are smooth-walled hyaline and uninucleated as well, averaging 8–13 μm in size.

Upon germination, a sorocyst becomes an amoeba. The amoeba is limax-shaped and uninucleate. Their single pseudopodia consists of a clear hyaline cap, allowing the amoeba to move fast. The dimensions of the amoeba average to be 23 μm in length and 7 μm in width. Within the amoeba, the nucleus size is measured at 4 μm averagely with a central nucleolus.

In culture, an amoeba germinated from a sorocyst develops into a sphaerocyst after a short period of growth. The appearance of its sphaerocyst is distinguishable: double-walled, brownish-yellow, and generally rounder than sorocysts and microcysts measuring 12–13 μm in diameter. These thick-walled sphareocysts occur after two amoeba undergo plasmogamy followed by karyogamy.

The microcyst is nearly identical to the morphology of the sorocyst. The difference lies in the stage of the life cycle each is produced, and microcysts may tend to be more irregular in shape like a puzzle piece. Rather than encyst on the sorocarp like a sorocyst, microcysts are a result of an amoeba encysting on a substrate. Once germinated, the amoeba leaves behind a wall.

== Behavior and life cycle ==
Copromyxa protea is the first slime mold found to be in the class Tubulinea of the supergroup Amoebozoa. More specifically, it is a cellular slime mold meaning an amoeboid protist that creates fruiting bodies.

As mentioned previously, the sorocarp is a mature fruiting body containing a sorocyst. Upon germination, the sorocyst develops into the monopodial amoeba. Microcysts are also able to germinate into amoeba.

The amoeba have the potential to encyst on the sorocarp to become founder cells. Once the development of a founder cell occurs, aggregation of amoeba ensues. How exactly the founder cell lures the amoeba to itself to aggregate is not yet known. The amoeba pile on top of the founder cell and encyst themselves, repeating until the fruiting body is elongated. A sorocarp can take the form of uniaxial or branched.

A sexual cycle also seems to be apparent. Uninucleate trophic amoeba proceed with plasmogamy and karyogamy which leads to the formation of a sphaerocyst. However, confirmation of secondary meiosis is yet to be established. Within culture, the sphaerocyst stage of the life cycle seems to lead to a halt. No germination has been observed following the formation of a sphaerocyst. This is only within lab settings, and germination is presumed to occur naturally in the wild.

The life cycle of cellular slime molds is ultimately separated into two main divisions. The trophic stage consists of the singular amoeba described above. Once the amoeba starts aggregating and establishing found cells, then the fruiting stage is kicked off. The fruiting bodies bear sorocysts to restart the life cycle.

== Ecology ==
Copromyxa protea can be found on the excrement of many bovine and equine creatures. Within the United States, it is popularly found on the fecal matter of cattle and horses. C. protea can use Escherichia coli (E. coli) as a nutrient source.
