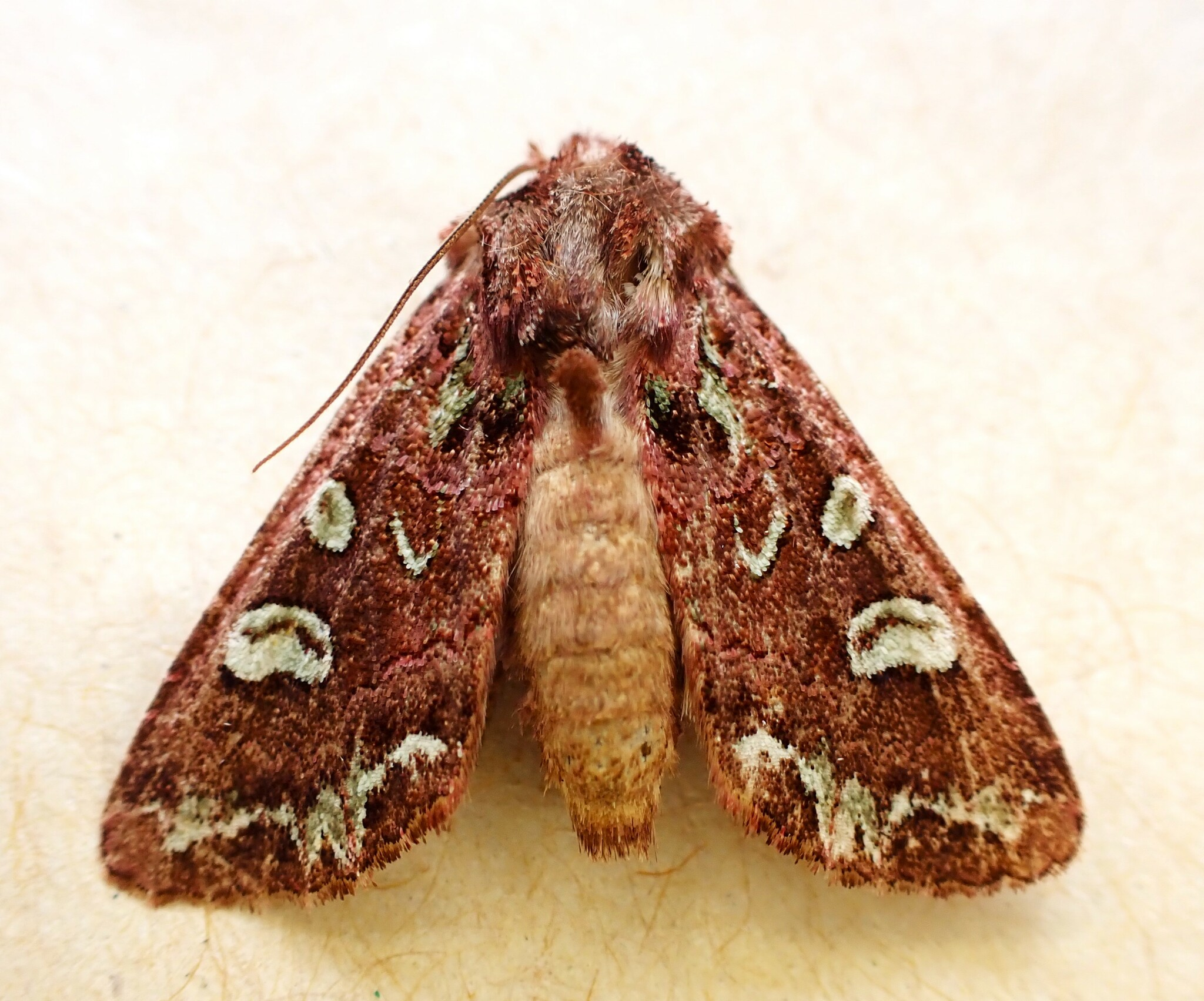
- Specimen of Ichneutica subcyprea collected from the Coromandel Peninsula

Scientific classification
- Kingdom: Animalia
- Phylum: Arthropoda
- Clade: Pancrustacea
- Class: Insecta
- Order: Lepidoptera
- Superfamily: Noctuoidea
- Family: Noctuidae
- Genus: Ichneutica
- Species: I. subcyprea

Binomial name
- Ichneutica subcyprea Hoare, 2019

= Ichneutica subcyprea =

Species of moth

Ichneutica subcyprea is a moth of the family Noctuidae. This species is endemic to New Zealand. This species is very similar in appearance to I. chlorodonta. It feeds on fern species in the genus Tmesipteris. It is the only New Zealand noctuid known to exclusively feed on ferns. The preferred habitat of this species is humid native forest and the adults are on the wing from September to December.

== Taxonomy ==
This species was first described by Robert Hoare in 2019. The holotype specimen was collected as a larva by Hoare on Farley Track in the Waitākere Ranges. He found it on a dead frond base of a tree fern in the genus Tmesipteris and reared it to adulthood on Tmesipteris. The holotype specimen is held at the New Zealand Arthropod Collection.

== Description ==
The larvae of this species are bright green in appearance.

Adult I. subcyprea is very similar in appearance to I. chlorodonta. However I. chlorodonta differs from I. subcyprea as the male of that species has slightly longer pectinations, it has a distinctive lilac-grey to lead grey colour to the antemedian and postmedian lines, green scaling between antemedian and postmedian lines, much darker brown hindwings, and has a paler underside of the hindwings.

The adult male wingspan is between 32 and 34 mm whereas the female wingspan is between 30 and 32 mm.

== Distribution ==
This species is endemic to New Zealand. I. subcyprea is found in the North Island in Northland, Auckland, the Coromandel, near Ohakune, on Mount Taranaki and Mount Messenger. This species has also been found in the South Island in Southland in the Opouri Valley.

== Habitat ==
This species exists where its host-plant lives, that is, in humid native forest.

== Behaviour ==
Larvae have been found feeding during the day upon the leaves of its host. The adults of this species are on the wing from September to December, although there is one record each from January and July.

== Life history and host species ==
I. subcyprea is the only New Zealand noctuid known to feed exclusively on ferns. They pupate in the dead fronds of their hosts.
