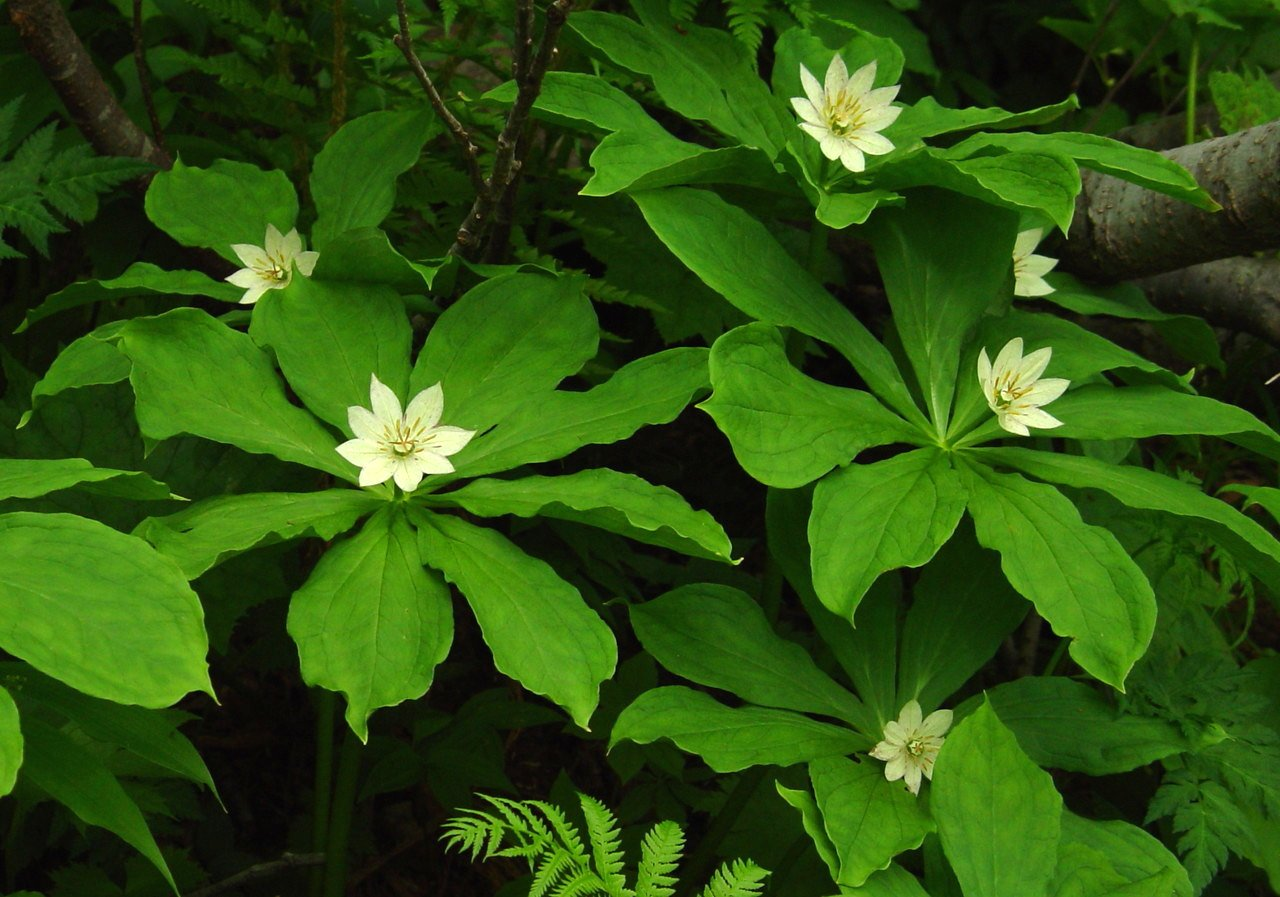
- Flowers and leaves
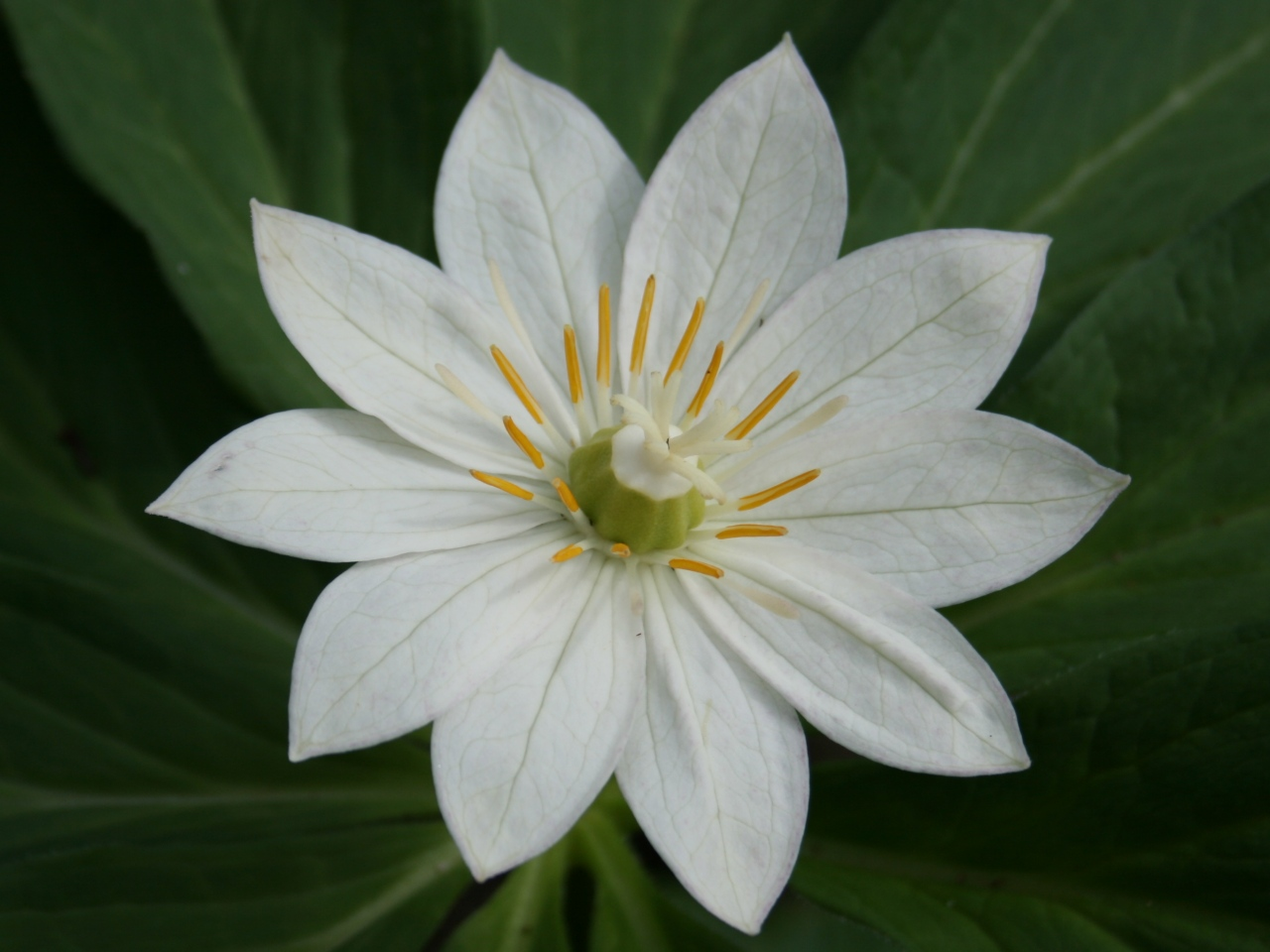
- Close-up of flower

Scientific classification
- Kingdom: Plantae
- Clade: Tracheophytes
- Clade: Angiosperms
- Clade: Monocots
- Order: Liliales
- Family: Melanthiaceae
- Genus: Paris
- Species: P. japonica

Binomial name
- Paris japonica Franchet

Synonyms
- Trillidium japonicum Franch. & Sav.; Trillium japonicum (Franch. & Sav.) Matsum.; Kinugasa japonica (Franch. & Sav.) Tatew. & Sutô

= Paris japonica =

Species of flowering plant

Paris japonica (キヌガサソウ, Kinugasasō; canopy plant) is a species of flowering plant in the family Melanthiaceae, native to Japan.

It is native to sub-alpine regions of Japan. A slow growing perennial, it flowers in July. The rare, showy white star-like flower is borne above a single whorl of six to eleven stem leaves, which is always the same as the number of petals in the flower. The number of sepals, stamens and carpels follow this same pattern. It prefers cool, humid, shady places.

== Genetics ==
Paris japonica is the previous record-holder of the largest genome of any plant yet assayed, about 150 billion base pairs long. An octoploid and suspected allopolyploid hybrid of four species, it has 40 chromosomes. With 150 billion base pairs of DNA in the haploid genome (50 times larger than that of a human haploid genome).

The flower has 19 billion more base pairs than the previous record holder, the marbled lungfish, whose 130 billion base pairs weigh in at 132.83 picograms per cell. Since then, other organisms have been assayed and reported to have larger genomes; The fork fern, Tmesipteris truncata has 160.45 billion base pairs per cell. The amoebozoan Polychaos dubium may have 670 billion base pairs per cell, but that measurement should be taken with caution because it was taken before the advent of modern genomic methods.
