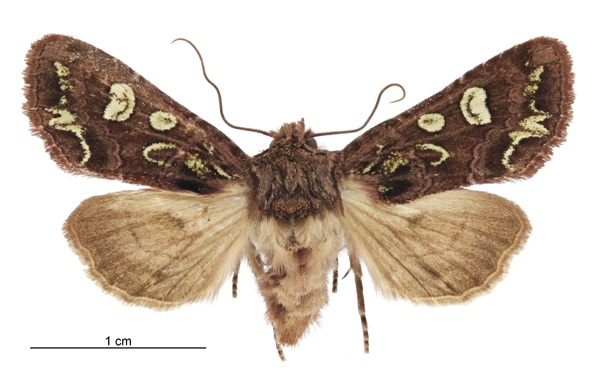
- Female
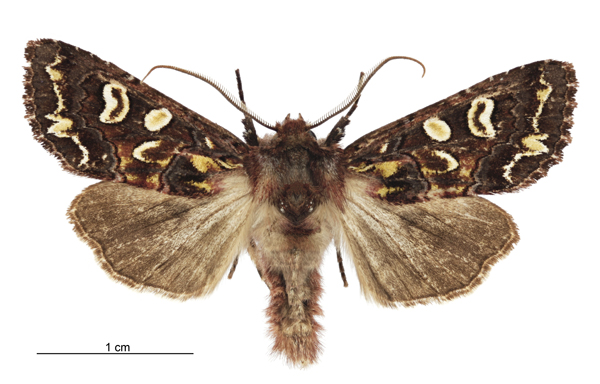
- Male

Scientific classification
- Kingdom: Animalia
- Phylum: Arthropoda
- Clade: Pancrustacea
- Class: Insecta
- Order: Lepidoptera
- Superfamily: Noctuoidea
- Family: Noctuidae
- Genus: Ichneutica
- Species: I. chlorodonta

Binomial name
- Ichneutica chlorodonta (Hampson, 1911)

Synonyms
- Morrisonia chlorodonta Hampson, 1911; Melanchra chlorodonta (Hampson, 1911); Graphania chlorodonta (Hampson, 1911)

= Ichneutica chlorodonta =

Species of moth endemic to New Zealand

Ichneutica chlorodonta, also known as the Green-toothed Owlet, is a moth of the family Noctuidae. This species is endemic to New Zealand. It is found throughout the North, South and Stewart Islands and is associated with native forest and shrubland. It can be confused with similar looking species such as I. subcyprea however I. chlorodonta can be distinguished through differences in colouration of its fore and hind wings as well as the length of the male pectinations. The life history of this species is unknown as are the host species of its larvae but adults of I. chlorodonta are on the wing from September to April.

== Taxonomy ==
I. chlorodonta was first described by George Hampson in 1911. The holotype specimen used by Hampson was collected in Ngāruawāhia by George Blundell Longstaff and is held by the Natural History Museum, London. In 1988 J. S. Dugdale, in his catalogue on New Zealand lepidoptera, placed this species within the Graphania genus. In 2019 Robert Hoare undertook a major review of New Zealand Noctuidae species. During this review the genus Ichneutica was greatly expanded and the genus Graphania was subsumed into that genus as a synonym. As a result of this review, this species is now known as Ichneutica chlorodonta.

== Description ==
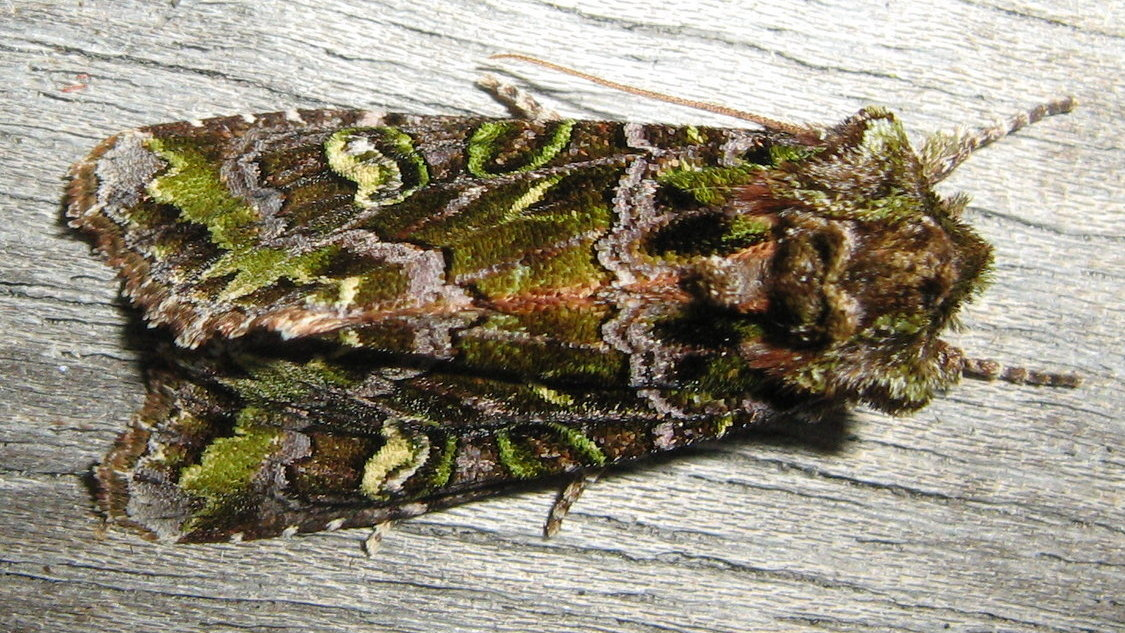
Ichneutica chlorodonta, the green-suffused form

Hampson first described this species as follows:

♀. Head and thorax bright rufous mixed with purple-grey especially on patagia, the tegulae with black line near tips; abdomen rufous. Fore wing bright rufous mixed with purple-grey and some olive-green; subbasal line double, black filled in with purple, dentate, bent inwards to base at vein 1, an oblique white striga beyond it across the cell and an olive-green patch above vein 1; antemedial line black defined on inner side by purple, slightly angled outwards below costa and excurved below the cell; claviform large, defined by black and white above and at extremity; orbicular and reniform large, with brown and green centres and white annuli defined by black, the former rather oblique elliptical, the latter with curved whitish striga in centre; postmedial line black defined on outer side by purple, double at costa, bent outwards below costa, then minutely dentate, incurved below vein 3, some whitish points beyond it on costa; sub-terminal line white with olive-green suffusion before it except towards costa and inner margin and defined on outer side by black, incurved below costa, angled outwards at vein 7 and dentate to termen at veins 4 and 3; a fine waved black terminal line. Hind wing red-brown with a fine pale line at base of cilia; the underside whitish thickly irrorated with red-brown, a dark discoidal spot and obliquely curved postmedial line. Ab. 1. Head and thorax olive-green mixed with purple-grey; abdomen brown mixed with whitish; fore wing purple-grey mixed with olive-green and without rufous; hind wing paler.

This species is very variable in the marking colouration on its forewings.

There are some species that resemble I. chlorodonta such as I. subcyprea as well as a Westland form, called by Robert Hoare in his 2019 publication, I. skelloni s.l. I. chlorodonta differs from I. subcyprea as the male of the species has slightly longer pectinations, it has a distinctive lilac-grey to lead grey colour to the antemedian and postmedian lines, green scaling between antemedian and postmedian lines, much darker brown hindwings, and has a paler underside of the hindwings.

The male I. chlorodonta has a wing span of between 31 and 36 mm and the female has a wingspan of between 27 and 34 mm.

== Distribution ==
This species is endemic to New Zealand. This species is found throughout the North, South and Stewart Islands of New Zealand.

== Habitat ==
I. chlorodonta inhabits native forest and shrubland.

== Behaviour ==
The adults of this species are on the wing from September to April.

== Life history and hosts ==
The life history of this species is unknown as are the host species of its larvae.
