= Glaeseria =

Scientific classification
- Domain: Eukaryota
- Phylum: Amoebozoa
- Class: Tubulinea
- Order: Euamoebida
- Family: Hartmannellidae
- Genus: Glaeseria; Volkonsky, 1931

Species
- G. mira (Glaser 1912) Volkonsky 1931

Genus of protozoans

Glaeseria is a genus of Amoebozoa, including the species Glaeseria mira and Glaeseria testudinis.

Family: Body monopodial; pseudopods rare; locomotion by slight forward bulging; cysts common. Genus: Hyaline cap usually present in locomotion; cysts uninucleate to trinuclearte (Illustrated Guide, 1985). Pseudopods formed by forward building, with a constriction at base.
