= Copromyxa =

Scientific classification
- Domain: Eukaryota
- Clade: Amorphea
- Phylum: Amoebozoa
- Class: Tubulinea
- Order: Euamoebida
- Family: Hartmannellidae
- Genus: Copromyxa; Zopf 1885

Type species
- Copromyxa protea (Fayod 1883) Zopf 1885

Species
- C. cantabrigiensis (Page 1974) Brown, Silberman & Spiegel 2011; C. laresi Kostka 2016; C. limacoides (Page 1967) Kostka et al. 2016; C. microcystidis van Wichelen et al. 2016; C. protea (Fayod 1883) Zopf 1885; C. vandevyveri van Wichelen et al. 2016

Synonyms
- Cashia Page 1974

Genus of amoebozoans

Copromyxa is a genus of Amoebozoa in the Lobosa lineage of the eukaryotic supergroup Amoebozoa. It currently includes 2 species, the sorocarpic (aggregatively fruiting) amoeba Copromyxa protea and the non-sorocarpic amoeba Copromyxa (=Hartmannella) cantabrigiensis. The named species Copromyxa arborescens, is a synonym of C. protea.
