= Mount Humboldt =

Mountain in New Caledonia

Mont Humboldt
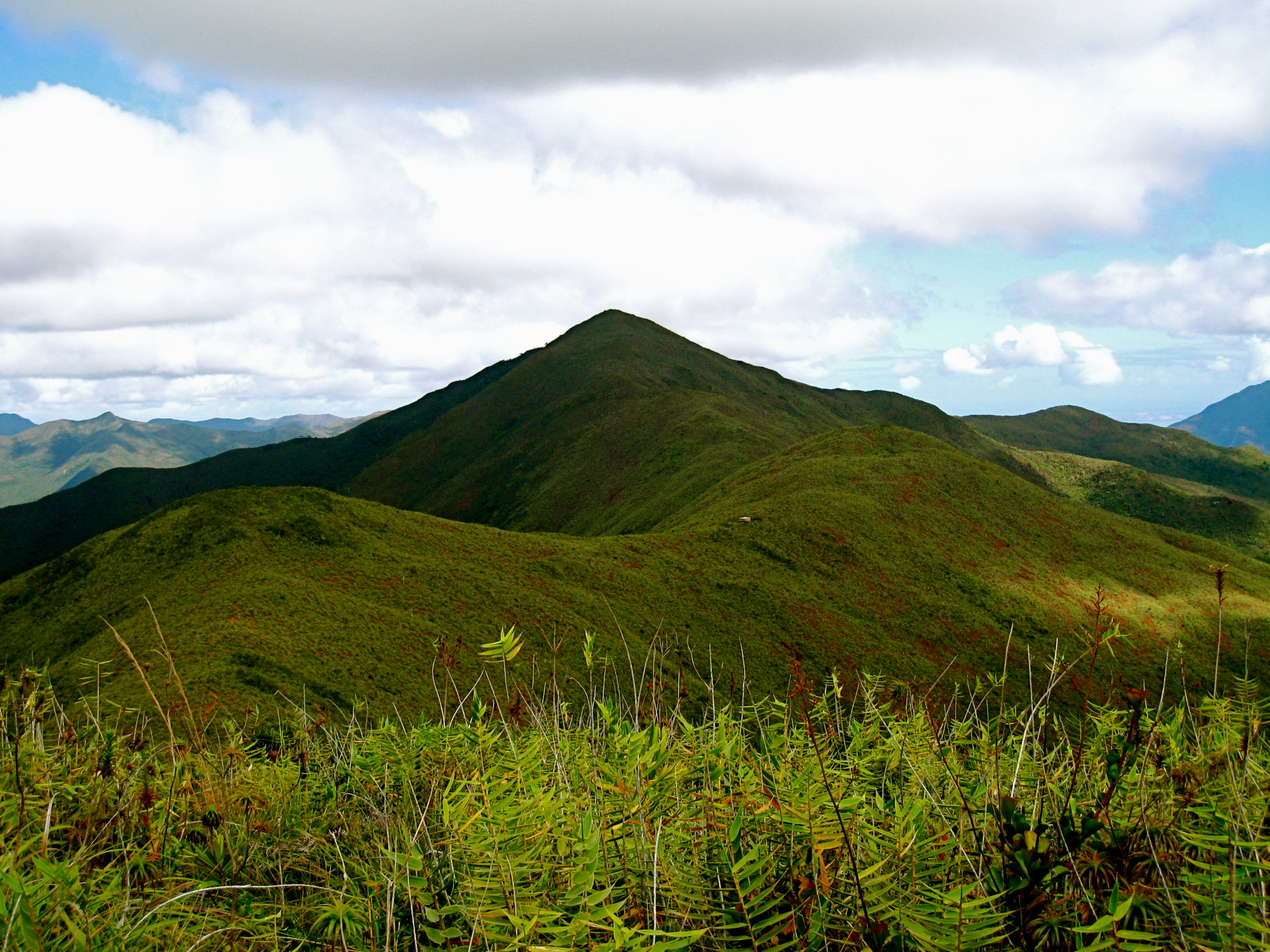

Highest point
- Elevation: 1,618 m (5,308 ft)
- Prominence: 1,325 m (4,347 ft)
- Isolation: 223.34 km (138.78 mi)
- Listing: Ribu
- Coordinates: 21.877°S 166.43°E

Geography
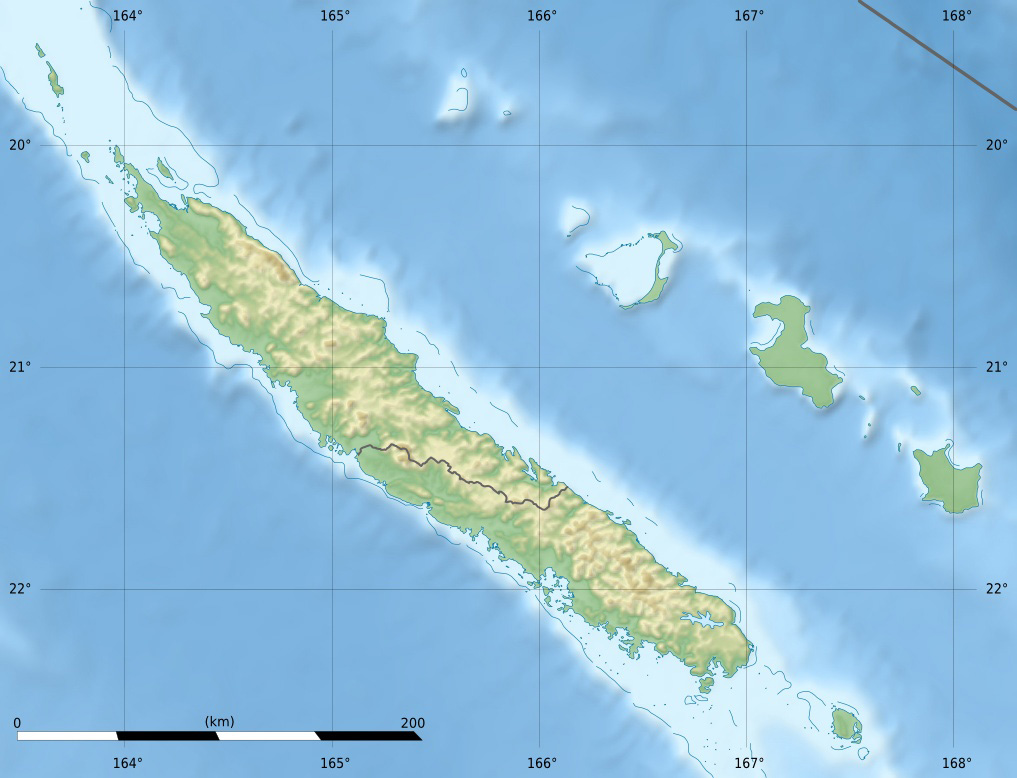
- Location within New Caledonia
- Location: New Caledonia
- Parent range: Chaîne Centrale

Mont Humboldt, or Mount Humboldt is a mountain in New Caledonia, Melanesia, and is the second tallest mountain in the region, being just ten metres short of Mont Panié.

== Flora ==
The mountain is home to a rare type of fern called Tmesipteris alticola.

== Etymological origins ==
Its name is derived from Prussian explorer Alexander von Humboldt.
