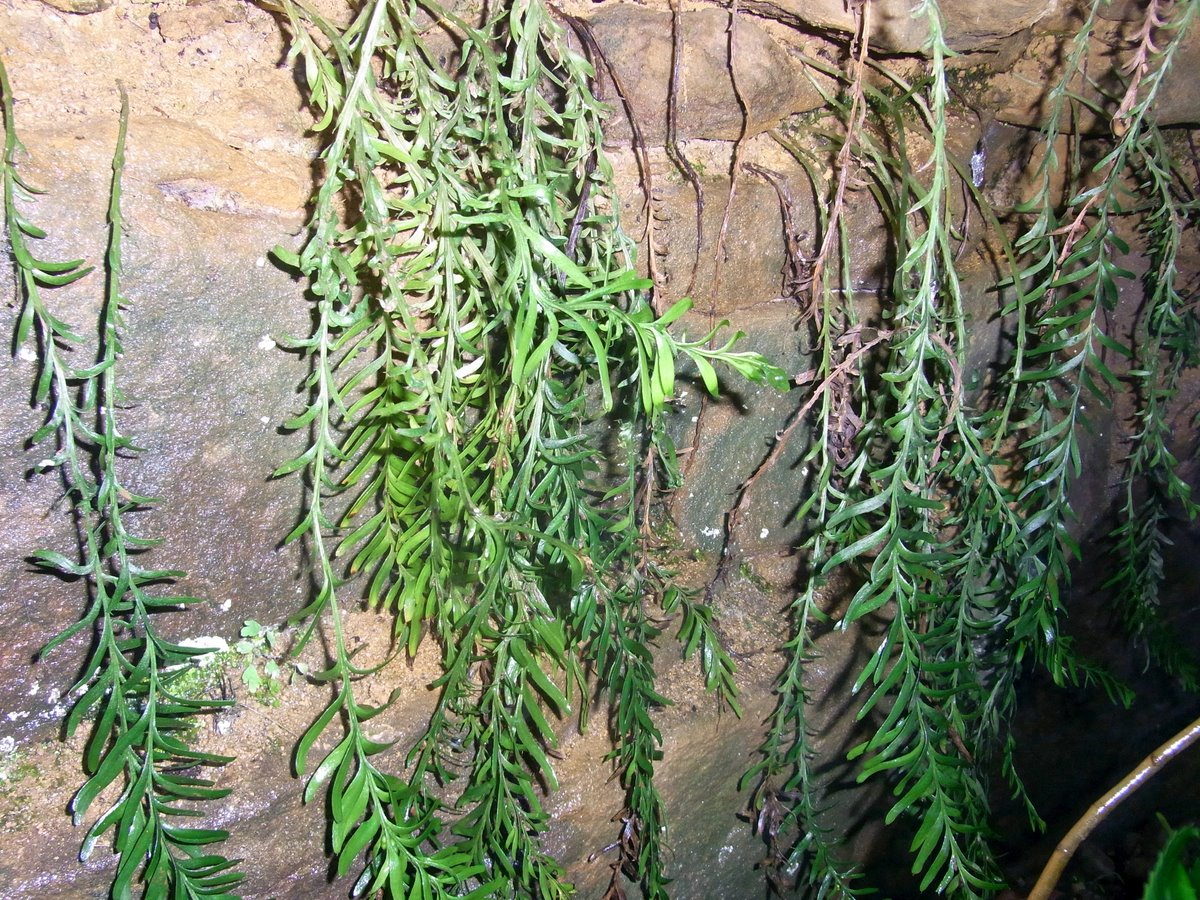
- Turramurra, Australia

Scientific classification
- Kingdom: Plantae
- Clade: Embryophytes
- Clade: Tracheophytes
- Division: Polypodiophyta
- Class: Polypodiopsida
- Order: Psilotales
- Family: Psilotaceae
- Genus: Tmesipteris
- Species: T. truncata

Binomial name
- Tmesipteris truncata (R.Br.) Desv.

Synonyms
- Tmesipteris oblanceolata Copel.; Psilotum truncatum R.Br.

= Tmesipteris truncata =

Fork fern

Species of plant

Tmesipteris truncata (aka Tmesipteris oblanceolata) is a fern endemic to eastern Australia. It is also known as a fork fern. The habitat of this primitive plant is under waterfalls, or in sandstone gullies or rainforests. It is often found growing on the base of the King Fern. Usually seen as an epiphyte or lithophyte, but it may also appear as a terrestrial plant. It is found as far south as Mount Dromedary.

The stems are 15 to 30 cm (5.9 to 11.8 in) long, mostly unbranched. Three or four grooves are at the base. The leaves grow shorter at the base, also shorter at the apex of the stems. Leaves are narrow linear to oblong in shape; 15 to 25 mm long, 2 to 5 mm wide. The midvein of the leaf ends in a thin point. Synangia are 3 to 5 mm long.

The specific epithet truncata refers to the leaf tops, which appear abruptly cut off. This plant first appeared in scientific literature in 1810 as Psilotum truncatum in the Prodromus Florae Novae Hollandiae, authored by the prolific Scottish botanist, Robert Brown.

On 31 May 2024, Tmesipteris oblanceolata was reported to have been found to contain the largest known eukaryotic genome, with 160 billion base pairs, by comparison more than 50 times larger than the human genome.

== See also ==
- Polychaos dubium
