= Polychaos =

Scientific classification
- Domain: Eukaryota
- Supergroup: Amorphea
- Phylum: Amoebozoa
- Class: Tubulinea
- Order: Euamoebida
- Family: Hartmannellidae
- Genus: Polychaos; Schaeffer 1926

Type species
- Polychaos dubium (Schaeffer 1916) Schaeffer 1926

Polychaos is an amoeboid genus in the Amoebozoa group. Several characters unite the species in this genus. The pseudopods meld at their bases when the organism is moving, and have dorsal, longitudinal ridges. The nucleus is oval or ellipsoidal.

== Classification ==
Polychaos includes the following species:

- Polychaos annulatum (Pénard 1902) Smirnov & Goodkov 1998
- Polychaos dubium (Schaeffer, 1916) Schaeffer 1926
- Polychaos fasciculatum (Penard, 1902) Schaeffer 1926
- Polychaos nitidubium Bovee, 1970
- Polychaos timidum Bovee, 1972

Phylogenetic analysis has shown that this genus belongs to the family Hartmannellidae.
