= Copromyxella =

Scientific classification
- Domain: Eukaryota
- Phylum: Amoebozoa
- Class: Tubulinea
- Order: Euamoebida
- Family: Hartmannellidae
- Genus: Copromyxella; Raper, Worley & Kurzynski 1978

Species
- C. coralloides Raper, Worley & Kurzynski 1978; C. spicata Raper, Worley & Kurzynski 1978; C. silvatica Raper, Worley & Kurzynski 1978; C. filamentosa Raper, Worley & Kurzynski 1978

Genus of protozoans

Copromyxella is a genus of Amoebozoa.

It includes the species Copromyxella coralloides.
