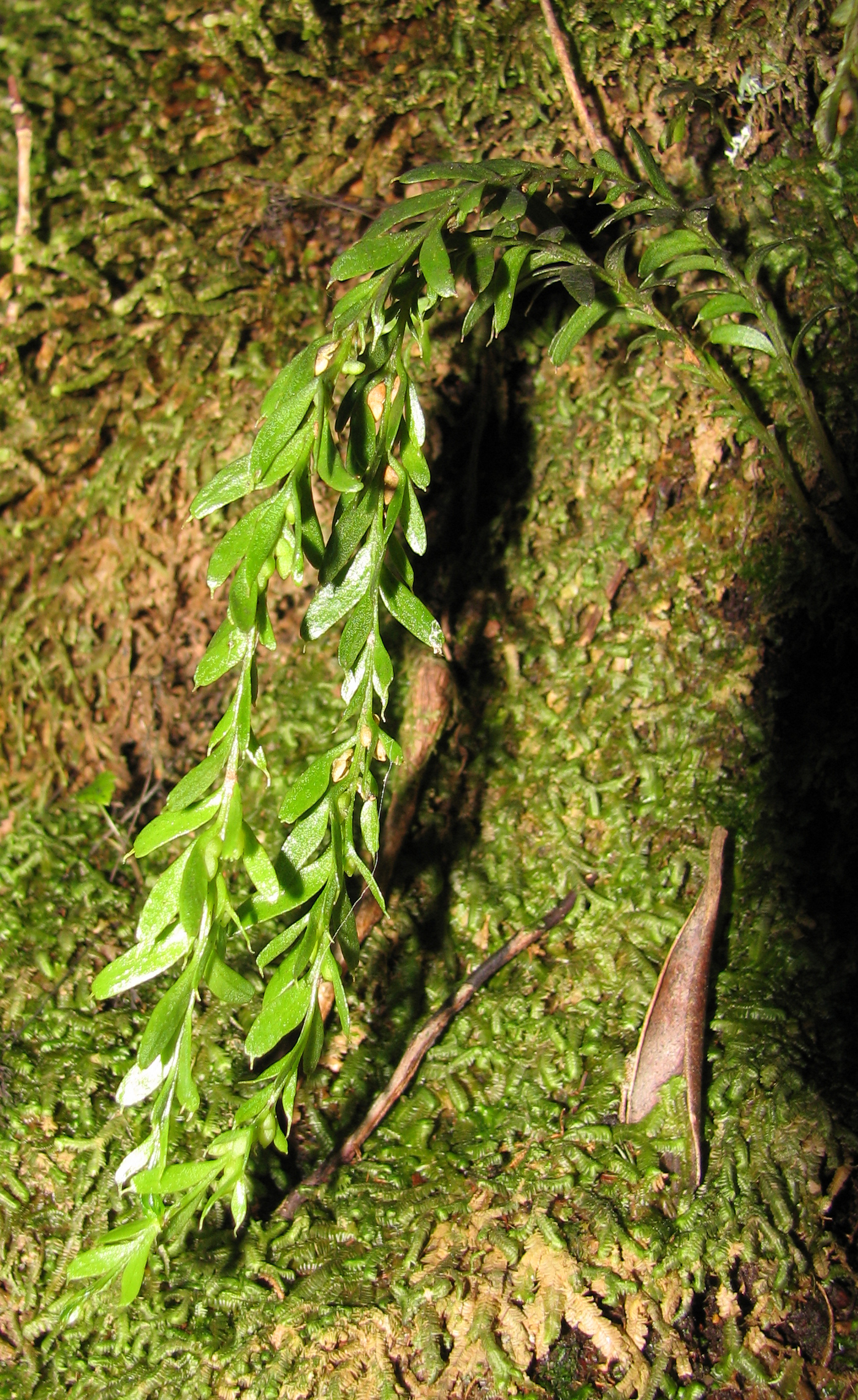
- Tmesipteris elongata

Scientific classification
- Kingdom: Plantae
- Clade: Tracheophytes
- Division: Polypodiophyta
- Class: Polypodiopsida
- Order: Psilotales
- Family: Psilotaceae
- Genus: Tmesipteris; Bernh.

Type species
- Tmesipteris tannensis (Sprengel 1800) Bernhardi 1801

Species
- See text

= Tmesipteris =

Genus of ferns

Tmesipteris, the hanging fork ferns, is a genus of ferns, one of two genera in the family Psilotaceae, order Psilotales (the other being Psilotum). Tmesipteris is restricted to certain lands in the Southern Pacific, notably Australia, New Zealand and New Caledonia. In New Zealand this hanging epiphyte is common in the warm temperate rain forests of both main islands, where it can normally be found as short spiky dark-green fronds (10–15 cm long), often with lighter bag-like sporangia at the bases of some of its "leaves". The plant possesses no true leaves; what appear to be leaves are flattened stems. The fronds emerge directly from the fibrous root-mats which clad the trunks of mature tree ferns such as Dicksonia and Cyathea. Tmesipteris is from the Greek language, meaning a "cut fern", referring to the truncated leaf tips.

== Taxonomy ==
The Smith et al. classification of 2006, incorporating molecular phylogenetics, placed Tmesipteris in Psilotaceae. Subsequent classifications have maintained this placement.

== Species ==
As of October 2026, the Checklist of Ferns and Lycophytes of the World and World Flora Online recognize 18 species in Tmesipteris. Plants of the World Online recognizes 15 species.

- Tmesipteris alticola Perrie & Brownsey – New Caledonia
- Tmesipteris elongata P.A.Dang – Australia (Victoria and Tasmania) and New Zealand (North Island, South Island, Stewart Island, Chatham Islands)
- Tmesipteris eucampta Perrie & Brownsey (not in POWO) – Lord Howe Island
- Tmesipteris gracilis Chinnock (included by POWO in T. solomonensis) – Marquesas Islands, Society Islands
- Tmesipteris horomaka Perrie, Brownsey & Lovis – New Zealand (Banks Peninsula)
- Tmesipteris lanceolata P.A.Dang. – New Caledonia and New Zealand (presumed extinct in Queensland)
- Tmesipteris norfolkensis P.S.Green (hanging fork-fern) – Norfolk Island
- Tmesipteris obliqua Chinnock (long fork-fern) – Australia (Victoria, Tasmania, New South Wales)
- Tmesipteris oblongifolia A.F.Braithw. – Vanuatu
- Tmesipteris ovata N.A.Wakef. (oval fork-fern) – Solomon Islands, Vanuatu, Australia (Victoria, New South Wales, Queensland)
- Tmesipteris parva N.A.Wakef. (small fork-fern) – Australia (Victoria, New South Wales)
- Tmesipteris sigmatifolia Chinnock – New Caledonia and New Zealand
- Tmesipteris solomonensis A.F.Braithw. – Solomon Islands
- Tmesipteris tannensis (Spreng.) Bernh. – New Zealand, Samoa, Society Islands
- Tmesipteris truncata (R.Br.) Desv. (includes T. oblanceolata, recognized by POWO) – Australia (New South Wales and Queensland)
- Tmesipteris vanuatensis A.F.Braithw. (included by POWO in T. solomonensis) – Vanuatu
- Tmesipteris vieillardii P.A.Dang – New Caledonia
- Tmesipteris zamorarum Gruèzo & V.B.Amoroso (included by POWO in T. solomonensis) – Luzon

== Phylogeny ==
Nitta et al. 2022 and Fern Tree of life

- - T. sigmatifolia
  - - T. gracilis
    - - - T. alticola
        - T. vieillardii
      - - T. truncata
        - - - T. elongata
            - T. horomaka
          - - T. obliqua (Long fork-fern)
            - T. tannensis
