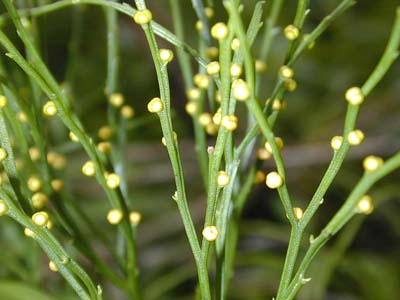

Conservation status
- Least Concern (IUCN 3.1)

- Secure (NatureServe)

Scientific classification
- Kingdom: Plantae
- Clade: Tracheophytes
- Division: Polypodiophyta
- Class: Polypodiopsida
- Order: Psilotales
- Family: Psilotaceae
- Genus: Psilotum
- Species: P. nudum

Binomial name
- Psilotum nudum (L.) P.Beauv.

Synonyms
- Bernhardia antillarum K.Mull.; Bernhardia capensis K.Mull.; Bernhardia deppeana K.Mull.; Bernhardia dichotoma Willd. ex Bernh.; Bernhardia novae-hollandiae Müll.Berol.; Bernhardia oahuensis K.Mull.; Hoffmannia aphylla Willd.; Lycopodium nudum L.; Psilotum domingense Gand.; Psilotum flabellatum Gand.; Psilotum floridanum Michx.; Psilotum heterocarpum Colenso; Psilotum novae-zelandiae Gand.; Psilotum triquetrum Sw.

= Psilotum nudum =

Species of fern

Psilotum nudum In Oahu, Hawaii. Pictured July 2, 1966.

Psilotum nudum, commonly known as the whisk fern, is a species of fern in the order Psilotales. Like the other species in this order, it lacks roots and instead possesses underground rhizomes. It reporduces by spores.

Psilotum nudum means "bare naked" in Latin, because it lacks (or seems to lack) most of the organs of typical vascular plants as a result of evolutionary reduction. The leaves are not actually absent but greatly reduced.

Psilotum nudum are commonly found in tropical and subtropical regions. It is commonly found in Hawaii and found in their original leis.

== Description ==
Psilotum nudum lacks true roots and has greatly reduced leaf appendages known as enations. It is green, with sporangia that produces spores. Whisk ferns have Y shaped stems.

In regard to the reproduction of Psilotum nudum they use spores. In both the typical form and an appendageless variant, synagia (spore-bearing reproductive structure) may occur at the tips of the aerial axes. Additional, Psilotum nudum can reproduce vegetatively through small, multicellular structures known as gemmae. Gemmae contains starch reserves and help in the development of new rhizomes.

For underground axes (or central stem), research has shown that they have similarly equal dimeters of 2 to 3 mm in an uncrowded conditions, while the diamter is 0.7 to 3.5mm in crowded conditions. The central stem transports water and minerals throughout the plant.

== Development ==
The embryo has only two parts, a distal shoot apex and a proximal foot. The shoot apex produces a rhizome without roots, possibly because P. nudum and relatives are often epiphytes. The rhizome in turn will eventually produce greatly reduced leaves instead of roots. The rhizome are associated with anchoring the plant and the nutrient uptake. The underground rhizome contains a protostele, a vascular region arrangement in which the central xylem is surrounded by phloem and lacks a central pith. The xylem is composed entirely of tracheids and is exarch.

These processes are heavily influenced by auxin concentrations.

When grown axenically, P. nudum spores and gametophytes require a sugar source to support growth and gamete production in the absence of a fungal symbiont.

== Distribution ==
P. nudum is found in tropical Africa, Central America, tropical and subtropical North America, South America, tropical Asia, Australia, Hawaii, southern Japan, Lord Howe Island, New Zealand, with a few isolated populations in SW Europe ("Los Alcornocales", Spain, Cádiz province). Although most weeds are flowering plants, P. nudum is an unusual example of a weed because it is both nonflowering and rootless.

In tropical areas, this plant is often epiphytic, whilst in more temperate areas, such as south-eastern Australia, it is usually found growing in rock crevices. Thousands of people per day walk by these plants at the Sydney Opera House forecourt.

== Cultivation and uses ==
The plant, which grows wild in southern Japan, was once much cultivated in Japanese gardens as an ornamental plant. Slightly over 100 garden varieties were given fantastic names. Called matsubaran ("pine-needle orchid") in Japanese, it was one of the noble plants in the Edo period (1603–1867).

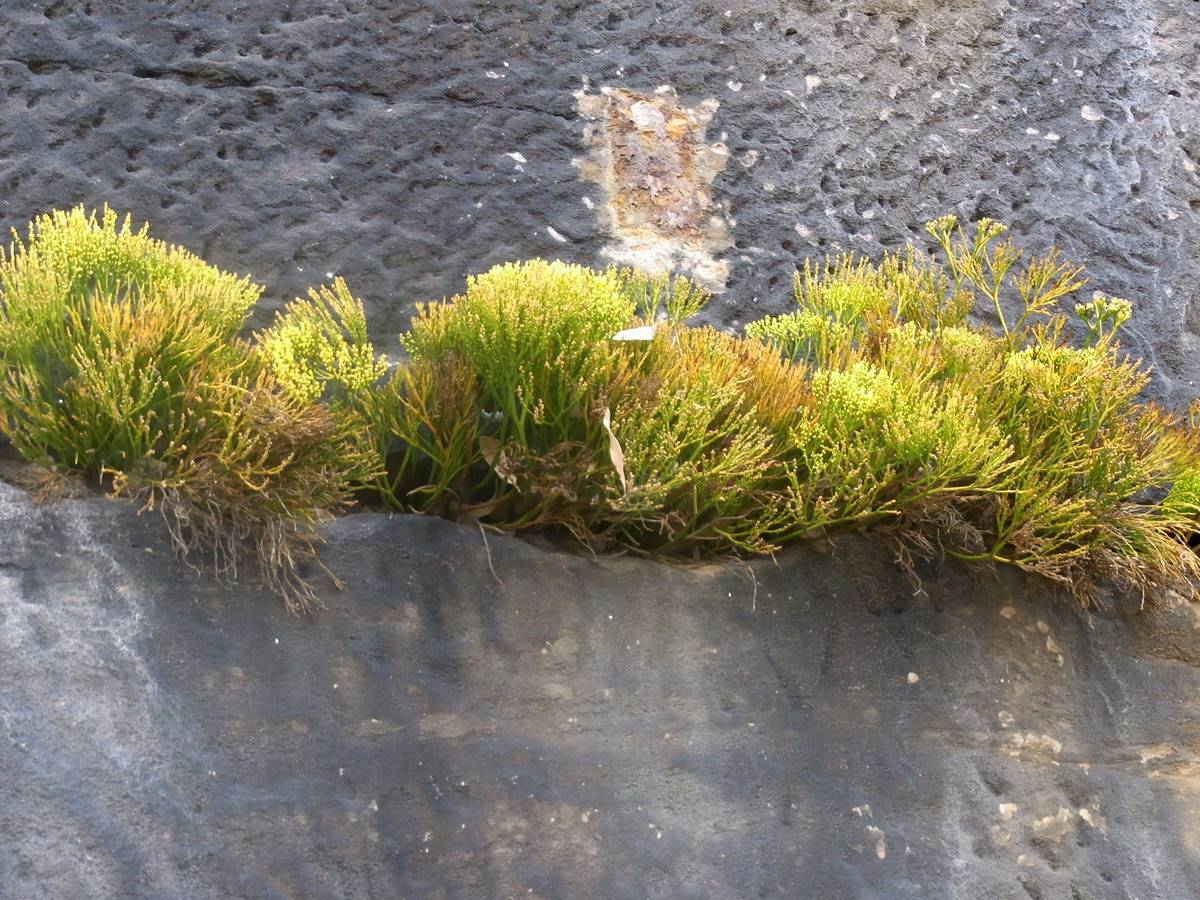
Psilotum nudum at the Sydney Opera House, Australia

The species is naturally found on all the main Hawaiian Islands. Known locally as Moa because of its chicken feet like stems, the Hawaiians collected large quantities of the spores and used them like talcum powder, under the loincloth to prevent chafing. The spores were also used medicinally as a purge. Children would play a game called 'moa nahele' or cockfighting with the branch stems. Twigs of the Moa were interlocked and the players pulled on the ends. The loser's twig broke and the winner crowed like a rooster. The species is still often used in making traditional Hawaiian leis.

Its common name, whisk fern, alludes to its use in the past as a small broom, made by tying a handful of its branches together. It is sometimes found in cultivation (either accidentally, as a weed in greenhouses, or deliberately, in the form of a number of cultivars).

It may prove to be a good source of antimicrobial chemicals.
