= Polychaos dubium =

Scientific classification
- Domain: Eukaryota
- Phylum: Amoebozoa
- Class: Tubulinea
- Order: Euamoebida
- Family: Hartmannellidae
- Genus: Polychaos
- Species: P. dubium

Binomial name
- Polychaos dubium (Schaeffer, 1916) Schaeffer, 1926

Synonyms
- Amoeba dubia Schaeffer, 1916; Polychaos dubia Schaeffer, 1926

Species of freshwater amoeboid

Polychaos dubium is a freshwater amoeboid and one of the larger species of single-celled eukaryote. Like other amoebozoans, P. dubium moves by means of temporary projections called pseudopods. P. dubium reportedly has one of the largest genome size of any organism known, though the authors of a 2004 study suggest treating that measurement with caution.

Polychaos dubium was previously known as Amoeba dubia. The author who named the species later recognized it as different from species of Amoeba, and so designated it the type species of the genus Polychaos. Unlike species of Amoeba, P. dubium lacks longitudinal ridges on its pseudopods.

== Physical characteristics ==
A few characteristics distinguish Polychaos dubium from other species of Polychaos. The crystals floating in its cytoplasm take the shape of flat bipyramids, flat plates, or clustered platelets. The nucleus is ellipsoid in shape, has granules next to the membrane, and lacks an endosome. The cell is usually polypodal (has many pseudopodia), and the endoplasm and ectoplasm of the cytoplasm are clear. During rapid locomotion, P. dubium may become monopodial (present only one pseudopod), but there are an average of 12 pseudopodia.

Polychaos dubium has one of the largest genomes known for any organism, consisting of 670 billion base pairs or 670 Gbp, which is over 200 times larger than the human genome (3.2 Gbp). The authors of one 2004 study, however, suggest treating that measurement with caution, because it was taken before the advent of modern genomic methods.

== Ecology and range ==
P. dubium inhabits freshwater and is herbivorous, eating algae. Specimens have been collected in North America, and northern Europe.
