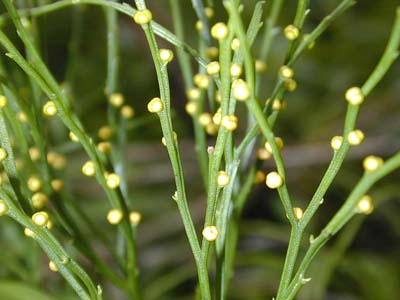
- Closeup of Psilotum nudum

Scientific classification
- Kingdom: Plantae
- Clade: Tracheophytes
- Division: Polypodiophyta
- Class: Polypodiopsida
- Order: Psilotales
- Family: Psilotaceae
- Genus: Psilotum; Sw.

Type species
- Psilotum nudum (L.) Beauvois

Species
- P. complanatum Sw.; P. ×intermedium Wagner; P. nudum (L.) Beauvois

Synonyms
- Hoffmannia Willdenow 1789; Bernhardia Willdenow 1802; Tristeca Palisot De Beauvisage ex de Mirbel 1802

= Psilotum =

Genus of plants

Psilotum is a genus of fern-like vascular plants. It is one of two genera in the family Psilotaceae commonly known as whisk ferns, the other being Tmesipteris. Plants in these two genera were once thought to be descended from the earliest surviving vascular plants, but more recent phylogenies place them as basal ferns, as a sister group to Ophioglossales. They lack true roots, and leaves are very reduced, the stems being the organs containing photosynthetic and conducting tissue. There are only two species in Psilotum and a hybrid between the two. They differ from those in Tmesipteris in having stems with many branches and a synangium with three lobes rather than two.

== Description and life cycle ==
Whisk ferns in the genus Psilotum lack true roots but are anchored by creeping rhizomes. The stems have many branches with paired enations, which look like small leaves but have no vascular tissue. Above these enations there are synangia formed by the fusion of three sporangia and which produce the spores. When mature, the synangia release yellow to whitish spores which develop into a gametophyte less than 2 mm (0.08 in) long. The gametophyte lives underground as a mycoheterotroph, tapping into mycorrhizal networks to access carbon and other nutrients. When the gametophyte is mature, it is monoicous, producing both egg and sperm cells. The sperm cells swim using several flagella and when they reach an egg cell, unite with it to form the young sporophyte. A mature sporophyte may grow to a height of 30 cm (10 in) or more but has no apparent leaves. The stem has a core of thick-walled protostele in its centre surrounded by an endodermis which regulates the flow of water and nutrients. The surface of the stem is covered with stomata which allow gas exchange with the surroundings.

The gametophyte of Psilotum is unusual in that it branches dichotomously, lives underground and possesses vascular tissue. The nutrition of the gametophyte appears to be myco-heterotrophic, assisted by endophytic fungi.

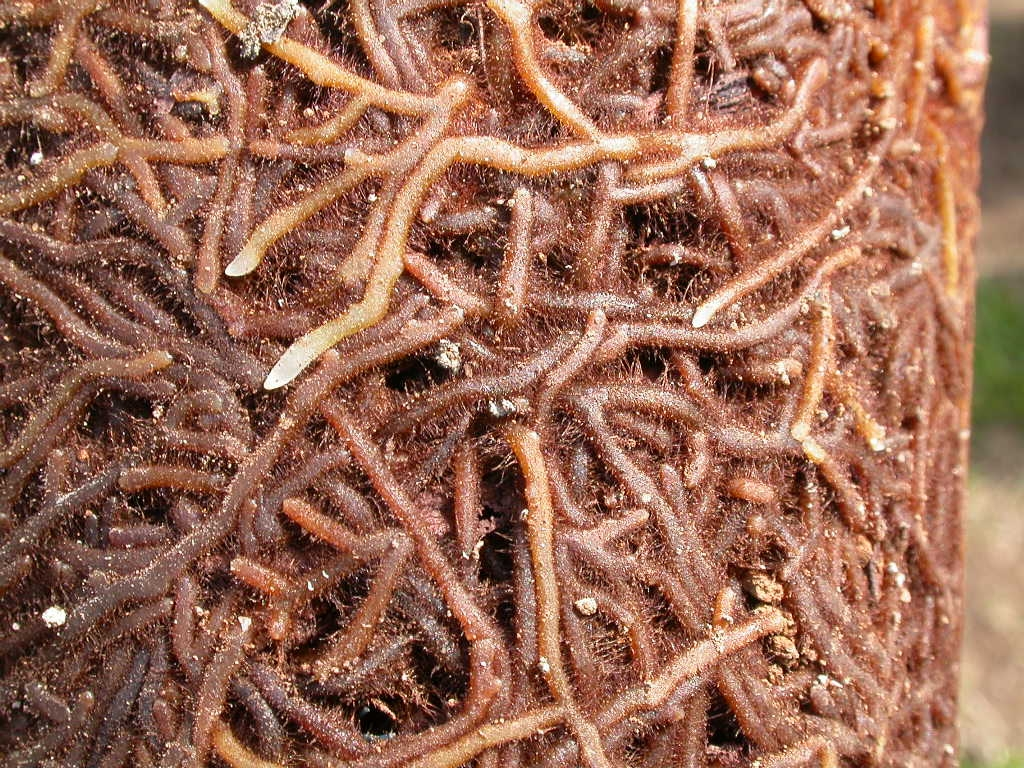
Psilotum nudum rhizomes

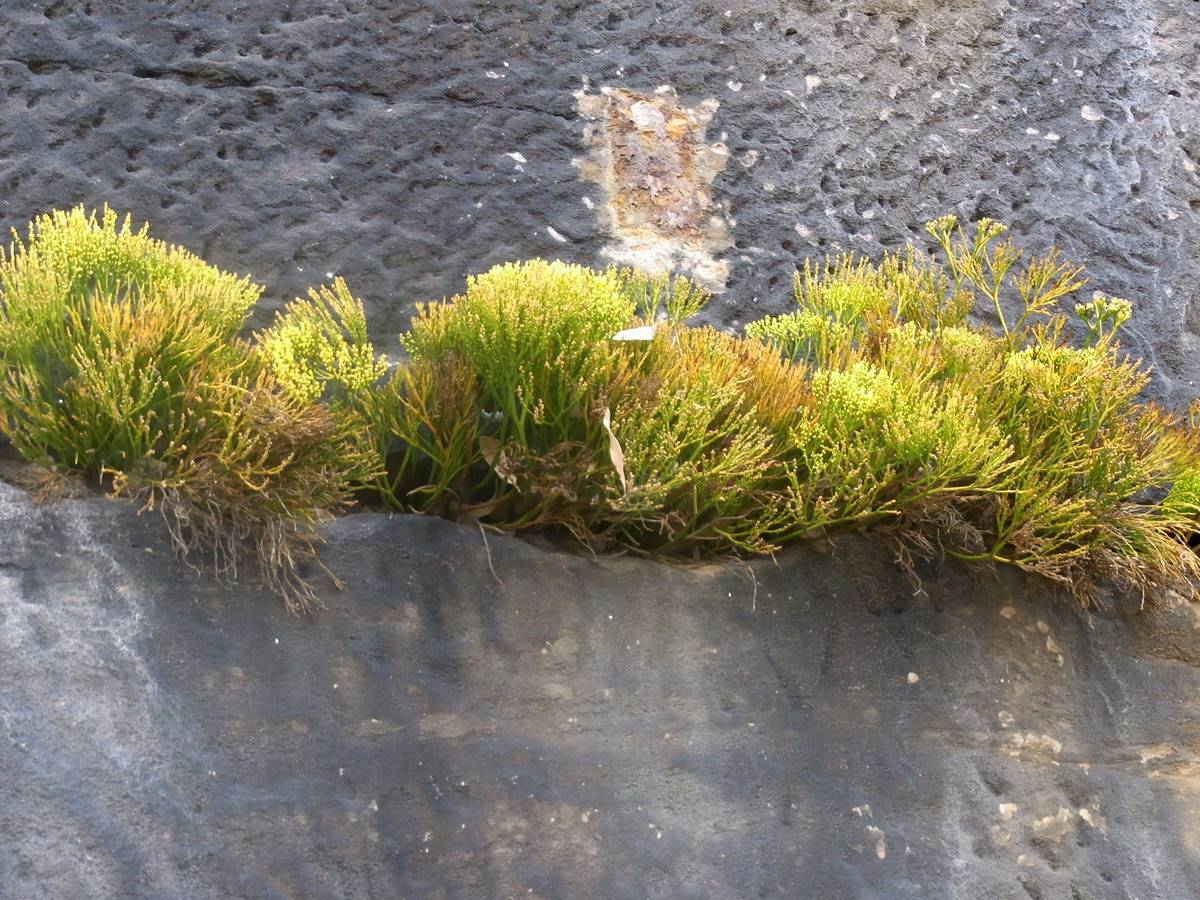
Clump of Psilotum nudum plants

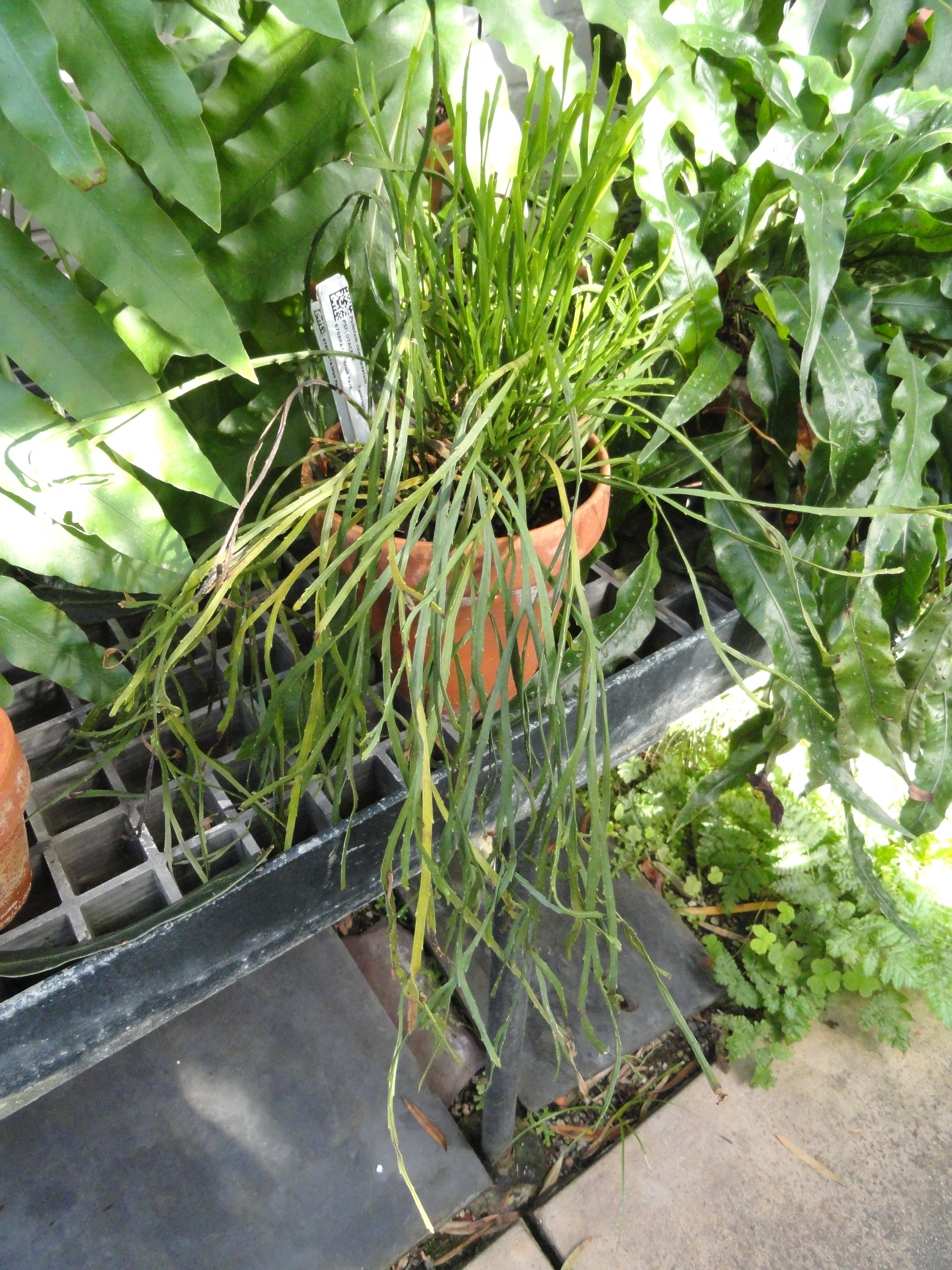
Psilotum complanatum plant

== Taxonomy and naming ==
The genus Psilotum was first formally described in 1801 by Olof Swartz and the description was published in Journal für die Botanik (Schrader). The name of the genus is from the Ancient Greek word psilos meaning "bare", "smooth" or "bald" referring to the lack of the usual plant organs, and the seeming lack of leaves.

The Smith et al. classification of 2006, based on molecular phylogeny, placed Psilotum in Psilotaceae. Subsequent classifications have maintained this placement.

== Species and distribution ==
There are two species, Psilotum nudum and Psilotum complanatum, with a hybrid between them known, Psilotum × intermedium W. H. Wagner.

The distribution of Psilotum is tropical and subtropical, in the New World, Asia, and the Pacific, with a few isolated populations in south-west Europe. The highest latitudes known are in South Carolina, Cádiz province in Spain, and southern Japan for P. nudum. In the U.S., P. nudum is found from Florida to Texas, and P. complanatum in Hawaii.

== Relation to ferns ==
Psilotum superficially resembles certain extinct early vascular plants, such as the rhyniophytes and the trimerophyte genus Psilophyton. The unusual features of Psilotum that suggest an affinity with early vascular plants include dichotomously branching sporophytes, aerial stems arising from horizontal rhizomes, a simple vascular cylinder, homosporous and terminal eusporangia and a lack of roots. Unfortunately, no fossils of psilophytes are known to exist. A careful study of the morphology and anatomy suggests that whisk ferns are not closely related to rhyniophytes, and that the ancestral features present in living psilophytes represent a reduction from a more typical modern fern plant. Significant differences between Psilotum and the rhyniophytes and trimerophytes are that the development of its vascular strand is exarch, while it is centrarch in rhyniophytes and trimerophytes. The sporangia of Psilotum are trilocular synangia resulting from the fusion of three adjacent sporangia, and these are borne laterally on the axes. In the rhyniophytes and trimerophytes the sporangia were single and in a terminal position on branches.

Molecular evidence strongly confirms that Psilotum is a fern (in the broad sense that includes horsetails) and that psilophytes are sister to ophioglossoid ferns.
