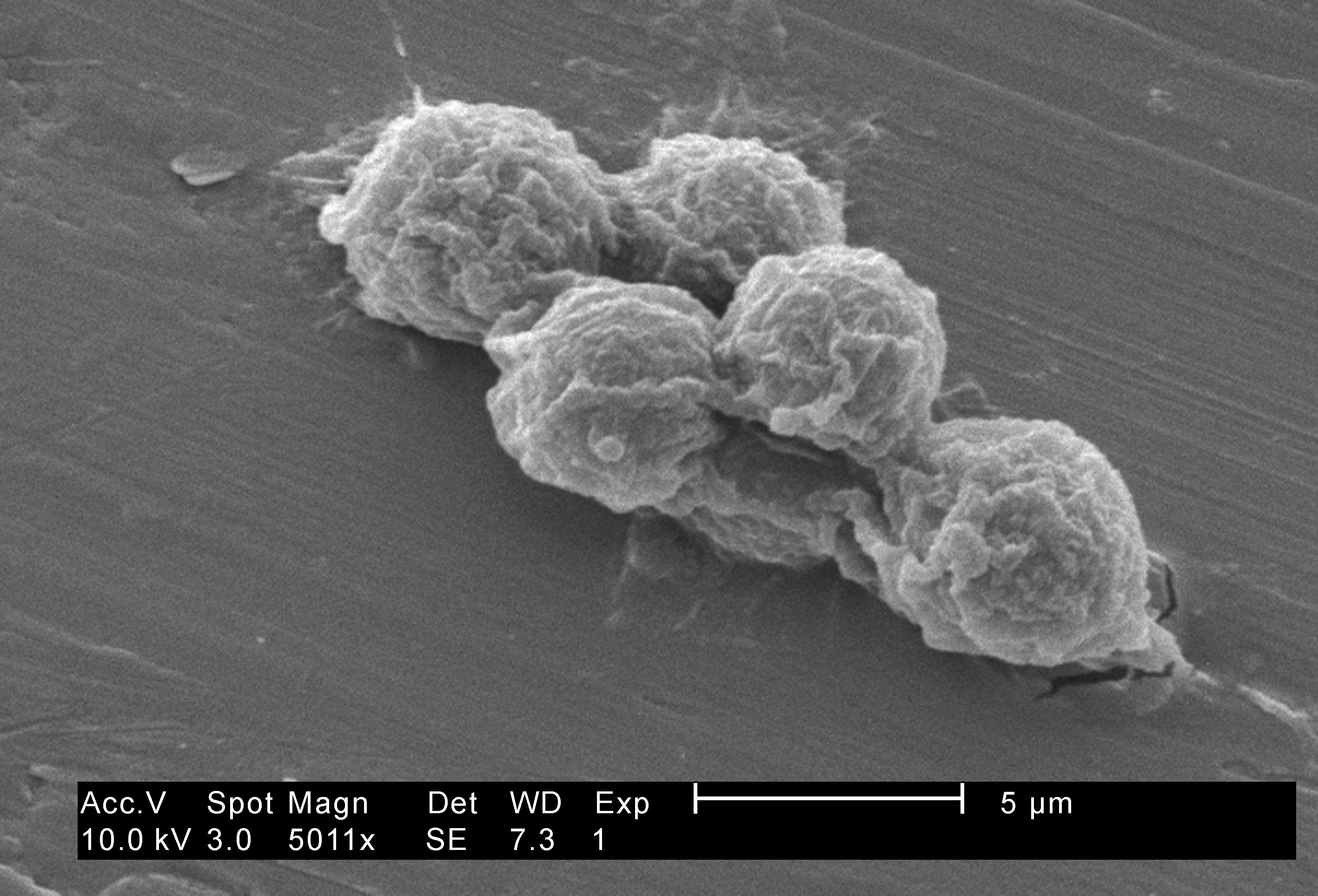
- Hartmannella vermiformis

Scientific classification
- Domain: Eukaryota
- Phylum: Amoebozoa
- Class: Tubulinea
- Order: Euamoebida
- Family: Hartmannellidae; Volkonsky 1931

Genera
- Copromyxa; Copromyxella; Glaeseria; Hartmannella; Nolandella; Polychaos; Ptolemeba; Saccamoeba

Synonyms
- Hartmannellinae Volkonsky 1931; Copromyxaceae Olive & Stoianovitch 1975; Copromyxidae Olive & Stoianovitch 1975

= Hartmannellidae =

Family of protozoans

The Hartmannellidae are a family of amoebozoa, usually found in soils. When active they tend to be roughly cylindrical in shape, with a single leading pseudopod and no subpseudopodia. This form somewhat resembles a slug and as such they are also called limax amoebae. Trees based on rRNA show the Hartmannellidae as usually defined are paraphyletic to the Amoebidae, which may adopt similar forms.
