= Fern ally =

Group of vascular plants

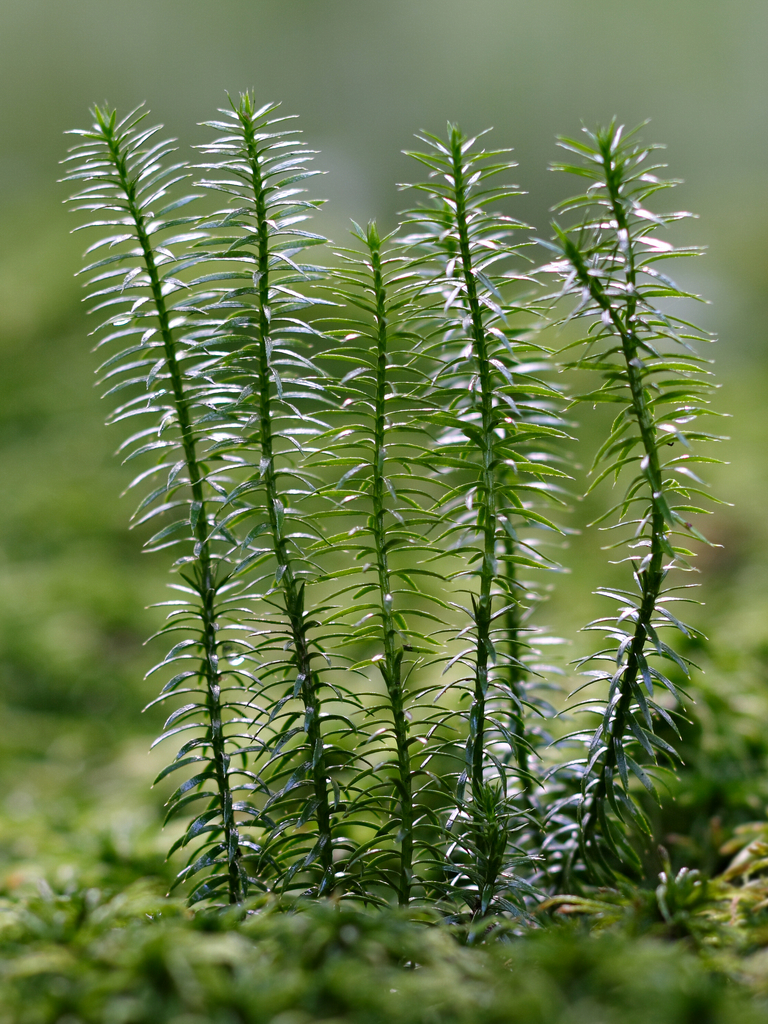
A clubmoss, from the Lycopodiopsida

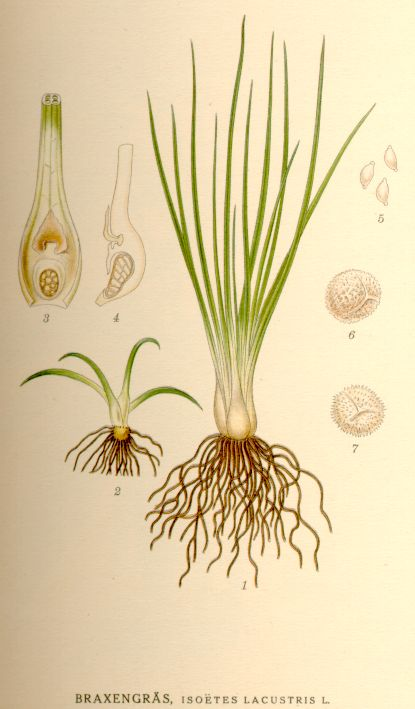
Isoëtes lacustris, a quillwort, from the Isoetopsida

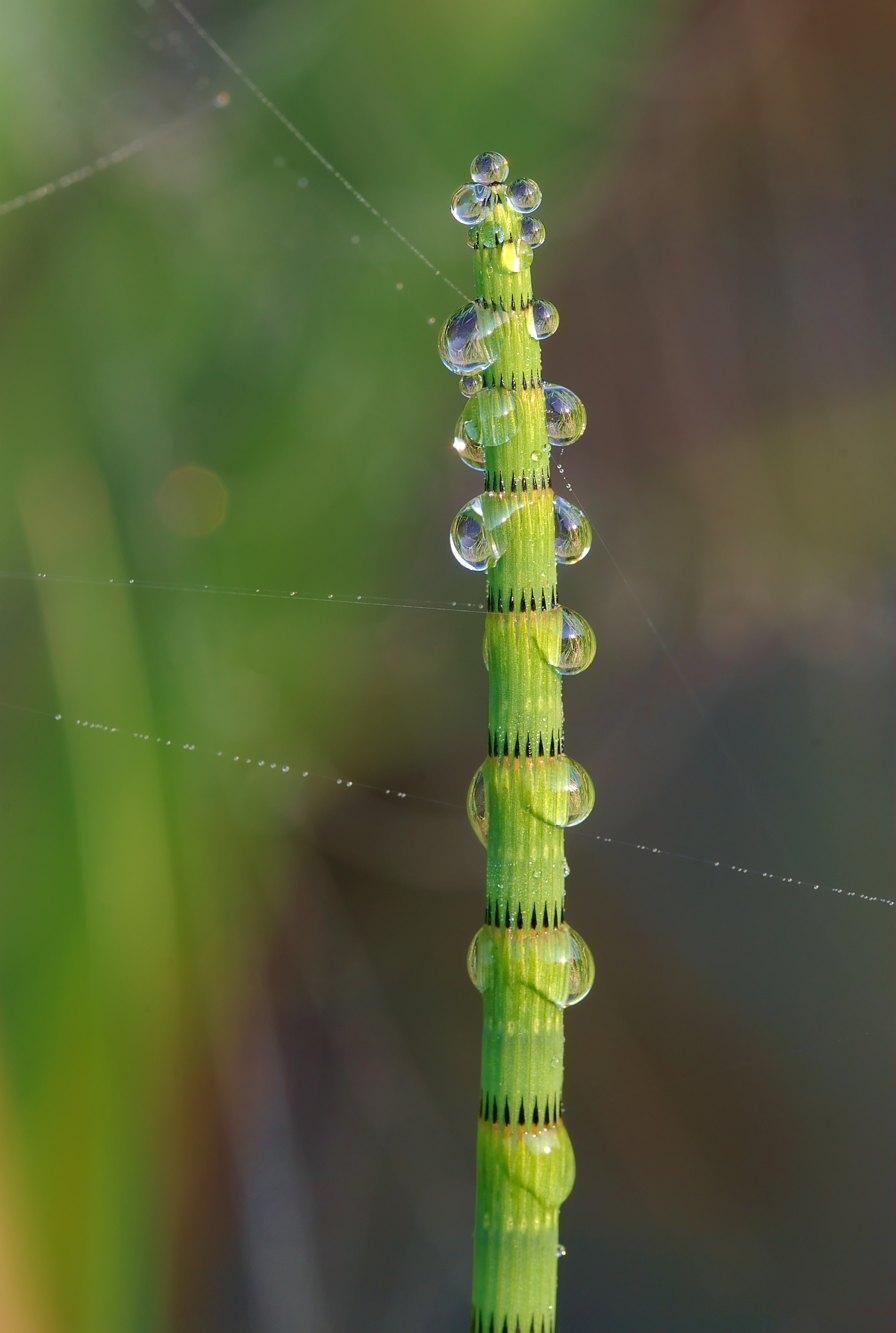
Equisetum fluviatile, from the Equisetopsida (horsetails)

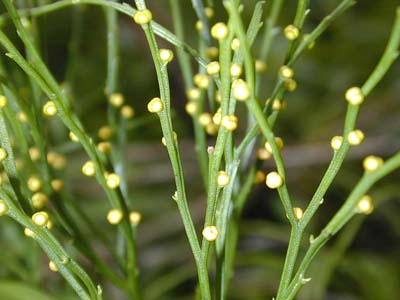
Psilotum nudum, from the Psilotopsida (whisk ferns)

Fern allies are a diverse group of seedless vascular plants that are not true ferns. Like ferns, a fern ally disperses by shedding spores to initiate an alternation of generations.

== Classification ==
Originally, three or four groups of plants were considered to be fern allies. In various classification schemes, these may be grouped as classes or divisions within the plant kingdom. Fern allies and ferns were sometimes grouped together as division Pteridophyta. Another traditional classification scheme of living plants is as follows (here, the first three classes are the "fern allies"):

- Kingdom: Plantae
  - Division Tracheophyta (vascular plants)
    - Class Lycopodiopsida, clubmosses and related plants (fern-allies)
    - Class Sphenopsida or Equisetopsida, horsetails and scouring-rushes (fern-allies)
    - Class Psilotopsida, whisk ferns (fern-allies)
    - Class Filices or Pteropsida, true ferns (including leptosporangiates, marattioids, adder's-tongues, and moonworts)
    - Class Spermatopsida (or sometimes as several different classes of seed-bearing plants)

More recent evidence shows that the class Filices, as described above, is not monophyletic. The following classification represents a consensus view (although different authors may use different names for the various groups):

- Kingdom Plantae
  - Division Tracheophyta
    - Class Lycopodiopsida
      - Order Lycopodiales, clubmosses
      - Order Selaginellales, spikemosses
      - Order Isoetales, quillworts and scale trees
    - Class Polypodiopsida, true ferns
      - Subclass Equisetidae, horsetails and scouring-rushes
      - Subclass Ophioglossidae, whisk ferns, adders'-tongues and moonworts (also called Psilotopsida)
      - Subclass Marattiidae, marattioid ferns
      - Subclass Polypodiidae, leptosporangiate ferns (also called Pteridopsida, or Filicopsida)
    - Class Spermatophyta (or as several different divisions of seed-bearing plants)

Note that in either scheme, the same basic groups are recognized (Lycopodiophyta, Equisetopsida, Psilotopsida, and true ferns), but in the most recent scheme, both Equisetopsida and Psilotopsida are grouped as a subset of the true ferns, and only the Lycopodiophyta are not classified as ferns.

== Relationships ==
Historically, several groups of plants were considered "fern allies": the clubmosses, spikemosses, and quillworts in the Lycopodiophyta, the whisk ferns in Psilotaceae, and the horsetails in the Equisetaceae. Similarly, three discrete groups of plants had been considered ferns: the adders-tongues, moonworts, and grape-ferns (Ophioglossales), the Marattiaceae, and the leptosporangiate ferns. More recent genetic studies have shown that the Lycopodiophyta are only distantly related to any other vascular plants, having radiated evolutionarily at the base of the vascular plant clade, while both the whisk ferns and horsetails are as much true ferns as are the Ophioglossoids and Marattiaceae. The Marattiaceae are a group of tropical ferns with a large, fleshy rhizome, and are now thought to be a sister group to the main group of ferns, the leptosporangiate ferns. The whisk ferns and Ophioglossids are demonstrably a clade, as are the leptosporangiate ferns and marattiaceae; however, the relationships between these two groups and the horsetails within the overarching clade of ferns remains uncertain.
