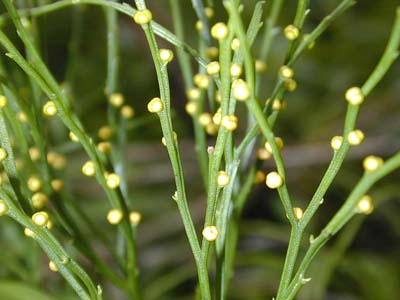
- Closeup of Psilotum nudum

Scientific classification
- Kingdom: Plantae
- Clade: Tracheophytes
- Division: Polypodiophyta
- Class: Polypodiopsida
- Subclass: Ophioglossidae
- Order: Psilotales; Prantl
- Family: Psilotaceae; J.W. Griff. & Henfr.

Genera
- Psilotum; Tmesipteris

Synonyms
- Psiloteae Willkomm 1854; Tmesipteridaceae Nakai 1943

= Psilotaceae =

Family of ferns

Psilotaceae is a family of ferns (class Polypodiopsida) consisting of two genera, Psilotum and Tmesipteris with about a dozen species. It is the only family in the order Psilotales.

== Description ==
Once thought to be descendants of early vascular plants (the Psilophyta of the Devonian period), Psilotaceae have been shown by molecular phylogenetics to be ferns (Polypodiopsida), and a sister group of the Ophioglossaceae. The family contains two genera, Psilotum and Tmesipteris. The first genus, Psilotum, consists of small shrubby plants of the dry tropics commonly known as "whisk ferns". The other genus, Tmesipteris, is an epiphyte found in Australia, New Zealand, and New Caledonia.

All members of Psilotaceae are vascular plants without any true roots. Rather, the plants are anchored by an underground system of rhizomes. The small, stem-like gametophytes of Psilotaceae are located in this rhizome system, and they aid in a plant's nutrient absorption through the soil. This is primarily achieved through saprotrophic feeding on organic soil matter and mycorrhizal interactions.

Psilotaceae do not have leaves. Some species have leaf-like structures called enations which have no vascular tissue except for a small bundle at the base. These are almost peg-like, stubby and are generally not considered true leaves, though they likely evolved from them. Members of Tmesipteris may appear to have leaves, but these are really phylloclades, or flattened stems.

The sporangia of Psilotaceae are fused together into small and distinctive yellow balls called synangia (shown in the picture of P. nudum above). These synangia are located off the stems of the plants. They contain two sporangia each in Tmesipteris species, and three sporangia each in Psilotum species. A thick tapetum nourishes the developing spores, as is typical of eusporangiate ferns like Psilotaceae.

== Classification ==
In the molecular phylogenetic classification of Smith et al. in 2006, Psilotales, containing the single family Psilotaceae comprising Psilotum and Tmesipteris, was placed with the order Ophioglossales in the class Psilotopsida. The linear sequence of Christenhusz et al. (2011), intended for compatibility with the classification of Chase and Reveal (2009) which placed all land plants in Equisetopsida, made it a member of subclass Ophioglossidae, equivalent to Smith's Psilotopsida. The placement of Psilotales in subclass Ophioglossidae has subsequently been followed in the classifications of Christenhusz and Chase (2014) and PPG I (2016).

In the past Tmesipteris has been placed in its own family, Tmesipteridaceae, but this has not been maintained in the system of Smith et al. and later classifications.
