= Sphaerocarpos muccilloi =

Scientific classification
- Kingdom: Plantae
- Division: Marchantiophyta
- Class: Marchantiopsida
- Order: Sphaerocarpales
- Family: Sphaerocarpaceae
- Genus: Sphaerocarpos
- Species: S. muccilloi

Binomial name
- Sphaerocarpos muccilloi E.Vianna

Species of liverwort

Sphaerocarpos muccilloi is a species of liverwort in the family Sphaerocarpaceae.

== Description ==
Sphaerocarpos muccilloi grows in pale green mats. The thallus tissue is around five cells thick towards the center of the plant, but becomes as thin as one cell towards the edges. Those cells towards the edges are square or rectangular in shape, and are 56–108 micrometers (μm) long by 30–50 μm wide. The involucre which protects the plant's inflorescence is aggregate and oval- or cylindrical-shaped. It has a length of 1–2 millimeters (mm) and the opening is 170–280 μm wide.

=== Dioecy ===
S. muccilloi is a dioecious species, which means individual plants will have either male or female reproductive organs instead of both. The female plants grow roughly in a circular shape and are about 5–8 mm long. They are lobed, and the lobes grow upwards somewhat, with many rhizoids on their undersides.

The male plants are more oval-shaped and also lobed. They are purple in color and usually have one fork. They are also smaller, growing only 1–3 mm long. The male sex organ, the antheridium, is globular and 80–112 μm in diameter. It is supported by three stalk cells. The spore capsule is large (0.8–1 mm) and is embedded in the thallus. It has short hairs (seta) and a bulbous foot. The spores are yellowish-brown and grow in tetrads which are 108–180 μm wide. The spores are around 60–90 μm wide and are areolate.

=== Similar species ===
Sphaerocarpos muccilloi is closely related to other species of Sphaerocarpos. However, it can be told apart from each through different morphological features. Its spores separate at maturity from another place on the plant than in S. donnellii and S. cristatus, and they are a different color from the bright yellow spores of S. stipitiatus. The differences in spores are more minute when comparing to S. hians, S. michelii, S. texanus, and S. drewiae, but each of them have different sized spores and various patterns of meshes and ridges which make them unique.

== Taxonomy ==
Sphaerocarpos muccilloi represents the Brazilian population of Sphaerocarpaceae, being the only species of the family found in the country. It was first recognized as a distinct species by Eny Vianna in 1981, following the analysis of specimens collected from an earlier trip to Brazil in 1973.

== Distribution and habitat ==
According to the Red List of Rio Grande do Sul, S. muccilloi is a Critically Endangered species which can be found only in a few localities within the Brazilian state. These include the type locality of Porto Alegre and two locations surrounding it, São Leopoldo and Ivoti. However, because of the high levels of human habitation in these places and the time passed since the last observations of the species there, it is likely that S. muccilloi is no longer present in these locations. In 2017, the species was recorded in the Paleobotanical Sites of Arenito Mata of Santana do Livramento.

The species is most commonly found in areas of light shade on damp soil. It has been recorded among petrified wood and hornworts of the genus Phaeoceros.
