= Tom Harris (botanist) =

English paleobotanist (1903–1983)

Thomas Maxwell Harris FRS
- Born: January 8, 1903
- Died: May 1, 1983 (aged 80)
- Education: University of Cambridge
- Known for: Mesozoic plant assemblages in Scoresby Sound, Greenland and in Yorkshire
- Spouse: Katherine Massey
- Children: 1
- Scientific career
- Fields: palaeobotany
- Workplaces: University of Cambridge; University of Reading
- Doctoral advisors: Albert Seward
- Doctoral students: Winifred Pennington; William Gilbert Chaloner

Thomas Maxwell Harris FRS (8 January 1903 – 1 May 1983) was an English paleobotanist. His studies of the assemblages in Scoresby Sound, Greenland and in Yorkshire were significant in developing the field of palaeobotany.

== Early life and education ==
Harris was born 8 January 1903. He came from wealthy Leicester families of business people, inventors and engineers. His father, Alex Charles Harris, was an engineer with over 100 patents to his name, some of which were a commercial success. He encouraged his son to be interested in natural history. The family of his mother, Lucy Frances Evans, owned the town's flour mill. He had 2 sisters. The family moved to a 40 acre countryside estate in 1915. He was allowed to use several rooms in the mansion for his developing scientific interests, and grew many plants in the grounds, such as a collection of ferns.

He was initially educated at Merton House School, but moved to Wyggeston School Leicester when he was nine. After two years he boarded at Northampton Grammar School for a further two years and finally attended Bootham School, York. After help from his father and a correspondence course he had the qualifications to start at University College, Nottingham when he was 16. He was awarded a Pass degree in chemistry, physiology and botany from University of London, and was influenced by Henry Smith Holden to follow what he was seriously interested in, which led to Harris's career in paleobotany via his initial idea to become a country doctor with a side-line in natural history. Harris passed a scholarship to continue his studies at Christ's College, Cambridge. After taking courses in chemistry, physiology, (human) anatomy and botany in his first year, but, partly from his experience of anatomy, he changed direction and focused on botany in his second year. He then graduated with a B. A. degree.

== Career ==
Harris began research supervised by Albert Seward, head of the Botany Department at Cambridge University, initially supported by a Department of Scientific and Industrial Research grant. He was subsequently appointed to a fellowship at Christ's College and as a demonstrator in botany. His research project was on Rhaeto-Liassic fossil plants from Greenland that had been sent to Seward 25 years earlier. He worked on these for 9 years, travelling to Scoresby Sound in 1926 to collect more over a year with Lauge Koch, head of the Greenland Geological Survey. As a result he brought tons of rock back to Cambridge. Harris extracted the maximum information possible at the time from his material by using several techniques, developing a new, more investigative and rigorous approach to paleobotany. His research into these fossil plants resulted in the best description of a Mesozoic flora at that time.

Harris was appointed as a professor at the University of Reading in 1934, working in the botany department with Theodora Lisle Prankerd and Terence Ingold. He was Head of the Department of Botany. It expanded in number of academic staff and moved buildings during his tenure. He also supported the merger of Botany with the Department of Agriculture and Horticulture.

At Reading he was very involved in undergraduate teaching of plants, including leading field excursions to both local and the more distant locations of North Wales and the Cairngorms. However he also supervised post-graduate students, including William Chaloner and Winifred Pennington, both later professors of botany. Others who worked with him included Sergio Archangelsky from Argentina, Shya Chitaley and Theodore Delevoryas.

He continued research in paleobotany using museum and freshly collected field specimens. A very important aspect of his approach was his detailed efforts to re-assemble the features of the entire plant from the fragments present within rock specimens, both plant organs and cells. he showed that leaves, named Czekanowskia and capsules, named Leptostrobus, were parts of the same plant. His detailed study of leafy shoots within Rhaetian limestone, previously attributed to a lycopod by Igerna Sollas, revealed that they originated from a bryophyte, Naiadita. In the 1940s he began to study Jurassic plant fossils from cliffs on the Yorkshire coast that was brought together in publications between 1961–1979 to provide the best account of a Mesozoic compression flora to that date. He was supportive of the research of staff and students in his Department.

Harris spent most of academic year 1958 - 59 at University of Ghana to support development of its botanical teaching. He also visited North America and Stockholm to lecture and attend palaeobotanical meetings. he visited India several times, initially working with Birbal Sahni to develop a palaeosciences research institute, finally named after Sahani, and returning to lecture and for research several times.

He was vice-president of the Royal Society 1960 - 1961. He served as president of the Linnean Society of London from 1961 to 1964 and president of the International Organization of Palaeobotany in 1964—69.

He retired in 1968 and his health suffered after illness with tuberculosis. He died 1 May 1983.

== Personal life ==
Harris was noted as a person with great energy and stamina. He and Katharine Massey (died 1984), a lecturer at University of Manchester, married in 1928. They had a daughter.

== Awards and Commemoration ==
- Fellow of the Royal Society 1948
- Linnean Medal, Gold Medial for Botany, 1968

The Harris Garden, located on the University of Reading's Whiteknights Campus, was named after him.

== Partial bibliography ==
Although the majority of his publications name Harris as the sole author, most are the result of substantial collaborations.

- The Fossil Flora of Scoresby Sound East Greenland (Copenhagen, 1931).
- The British Rhaetic Flora (London, 1938).
- British Purbeck Charophyta (London, 1939).
- Liassic and Rhaetic Plants collected in 1936-38 from East Greenland, etc. (Copenhagen, 1946).
- Conifers of the Taxiodiaceæ from the Wealden Formation of Belgium, etc. (Brussels, 1953).
- The Yorkshire Jurassic flora (five volumes, London, 1961–1979).
