= Sphaerocarpos drewiae =

Conservation status
- Endangered (IUCN 2.3)

Scientific classification
- Kingdom: Plantae
- Clade: Embryophytes
- Division: Marchantiophyta
- Class: Marchantiopsida
- Order: Sphaerocarpales
- Family: Sphaerocarpaceae
- Genus: Sphaerocarpos
- Species: S. drewiae

Binomial name
- Sphaerocarpos drewiae Wigglesw.

Species of liverwort

Sphaerocarpos drewiae is a species of liverwort in the family Sphaerocarpaceae. It is endemic to California, where it is known from San Diego and Riverside Counties. Its common name is bottle liverwort.

This liverwort grows in shady spots in coastal sage scrub habitat. It is associated with another rare endemic liverwort, Geothallus tuberosus. Much of its habitat is near urbanized areas and it is threatened with habitat loss.

The name has occasionally been misspelled in the literature as Sphaerocarpos drewei
