= Angiopteris smithii =

Scientific classification
- Kingdom: Plantae
- Clade: Tracheophytes
- Division: Polypodiophyta
- Class: Polypodiopsida
- Order: Marattiales
- Family: Marattiaceae
- Genus: Angiopteris
- Species: A. smithii

Binomial name
- Angiopteris smithii Racib.

Synonyms
- Macroglossum smithii (Racib.) Campbell; Macroglossum alidae Copel.

Species of plant

Angiopteris smithii is a species of fern in the family Marattiaceae, which is native to Borneo, the Philippines, and Sulawesi. Unlike other forms of Angiopteris species, it is once-pinnate with huge leaflets up to 40 cm (16 in) long and 10 cm (3.9 in) wide.

== Taxonomy ==
Angiopteris smithii was first scientifically described by Marian Raciborski in 1902, based on cultivated material at Buitenzorg. In 1908, Edwin Copeland described a new genus of Marattiaceae, Macroglossum, in which he included a single newly described species, Macroglossum alidae. Named for the wife of Cecil Joslin Brooks, it was collected in Sarawak by H. S. Young. Douglas H. Campbell collected a quantity of material in Sarawak in 1913 to study the species, and after correspondence with Copeland, concluded that it was closely related but not identical to the material at Buitenzorg, which he transferred to Macroglossum as Macroglossum smithii in 1914. Subsequent authors doubted whether these species were, in fact, distinct, and a revision of Angiopteris by Cristina Rolleri in 2003 subsumed Macroglossum in that genus and treated the two species as conspecific under the name A. smithii.
