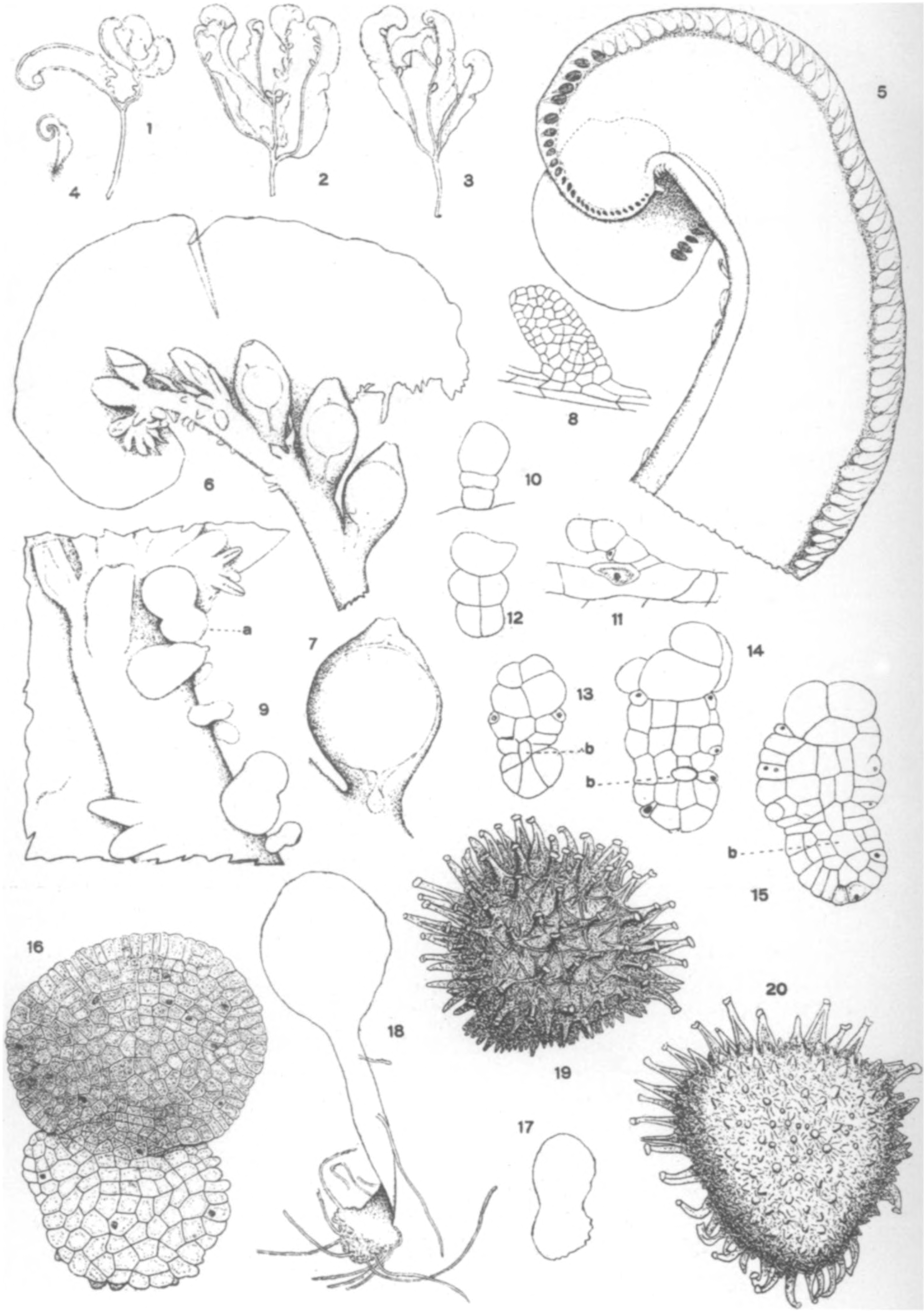

Scientific classification
- Kingdom: Plantae
- Division: Marchantiophyta
- Class: Marchantiopsida
- Order: Sphaerocarpales
- Family: Riellaceae
- Genus: Riella; Mont. 1852

Species
- See classification

Synonyms
- Duriaea Bory De St. Vincent & Montagne 1843; Duriella Bory de St. Vincent ex Billot 1861 non Row 1911 non Dhanam & Jairajpuri 1999; Maisonneuvea Trevisan 1877; (Trabutiella) Porsild 1902 non Stevens 1920 non Theissen & Sydow 1914

= Riella =

Genus of liverworts

Riella is a genus in the liverwort family Riellaceae, and includes about eighteen species. Plants in the genus are small and grow submerged in shallow temporary pools. Although the genus is widely distributed in the Northern Hemisphere, locating populations is often difficult. Its occurrence is sporadic and local, and the tiny plants are ephemeral. The ornamented spores remain viable for several years, allowing the plants to survive annual drying of their habitat. The plants are easily grown in laboratory cultures.

== Description ==
Riella plants are small, usually 2 inches (5.1 cm) or less, and thalloid, with an appearance like an immature alga. The plant consists of an erect central axis ("stem") that is commonly forked, but only sparingly, and the plants are bright green.

The stem bears a thin dorsal lamina or "wing", which being on only one side gives the plant an asymmetrical appearance. This lamina is ruffled or undulate. Early descriptions of the species Riella helicophylla overemphasized the spiralled form of the lamina, which does not occur in other species. One species, the Algerian Riella bialata bears two wings along its stems instead of the usual single lamina. The lamina has a thickness of only a single layer of cells, with all the cells thin-walled and chlorophyllose.

In addition to the lamina, the central stem bears delicate, small, leaf-like scales in three series along its lateral and ventral aspects. The leaf scales are dimorphic and contain scattered oil cells, with a single oil body per cell. Riella is thus the only member of its order with oil cells, although other genera in the class Marchantiopsida commonly have them.

== Distribution ==
Although found nearly worldwide, Riella populations are sporadic and limited to only a few known localities. The plants are never common, and are found most often in places where the summer is dry and the winter is wet and mild.

Prior to 1900, Riella was thought to occur only in regions around the Mediterranean. The first collections from outside this region were published in 1902 when Porsild reported collecting R. paulsenii in Kazakhstan in 1898. Three further specimens from the United States were reported in 1903, although one of these had been collected much earlier in 1855. Since that time, additional populations have been reported from South Africa, southern Argentina, and southeastern Australia.

Riella species primarily grow as submerged aquatic plants, rarely floating or emergent. Although it is unique among hepatics as a submerged aquatic, it is not the only aquatic liverwort. The plants grow in fresh or brackish water of temporary bodies of water, and rarely in permanent ones.

== Classification ==
The genus Riella was first published in 1852 by Camille Montagne. The group was given its own family Riellaceae 40 years later by Adolf Engler. Modern bryologists classify the Riellaceae in the order Sphaerocarpales, along with the family Sphaerocarpaceae. Studies comparing genetic sequences of Riella plants support this relationship.

Porsild recognized a subgenus Trabutiella distinguished by the presence of longitudinal wings on the involucre. The only other subgenus (Riella subg. Riella) bears smooth involucres that lack these wings of tissue.

Species of Riella are distinguished using morphology of the spores or archegonial involucres, since the gametophytes of the genus possess few distinguishing non-reproductive characters. There are 19, 18, or 17 species in the genus.

- Riella affinis
- Riella alatospora
- Riella americana
- Riella bialata
- Riella capensis
- Riella cossoniana
- Riella cyrenaica
- Riella echinospora
- Riella halophila
- Riella helicophylla
- Riella indica
- Riella notarisii
- Riella numidica
- Riella parisii
- Riella paulsenii
- Riella purpureospora
- Riella sersuensis
- Riella spiculata
