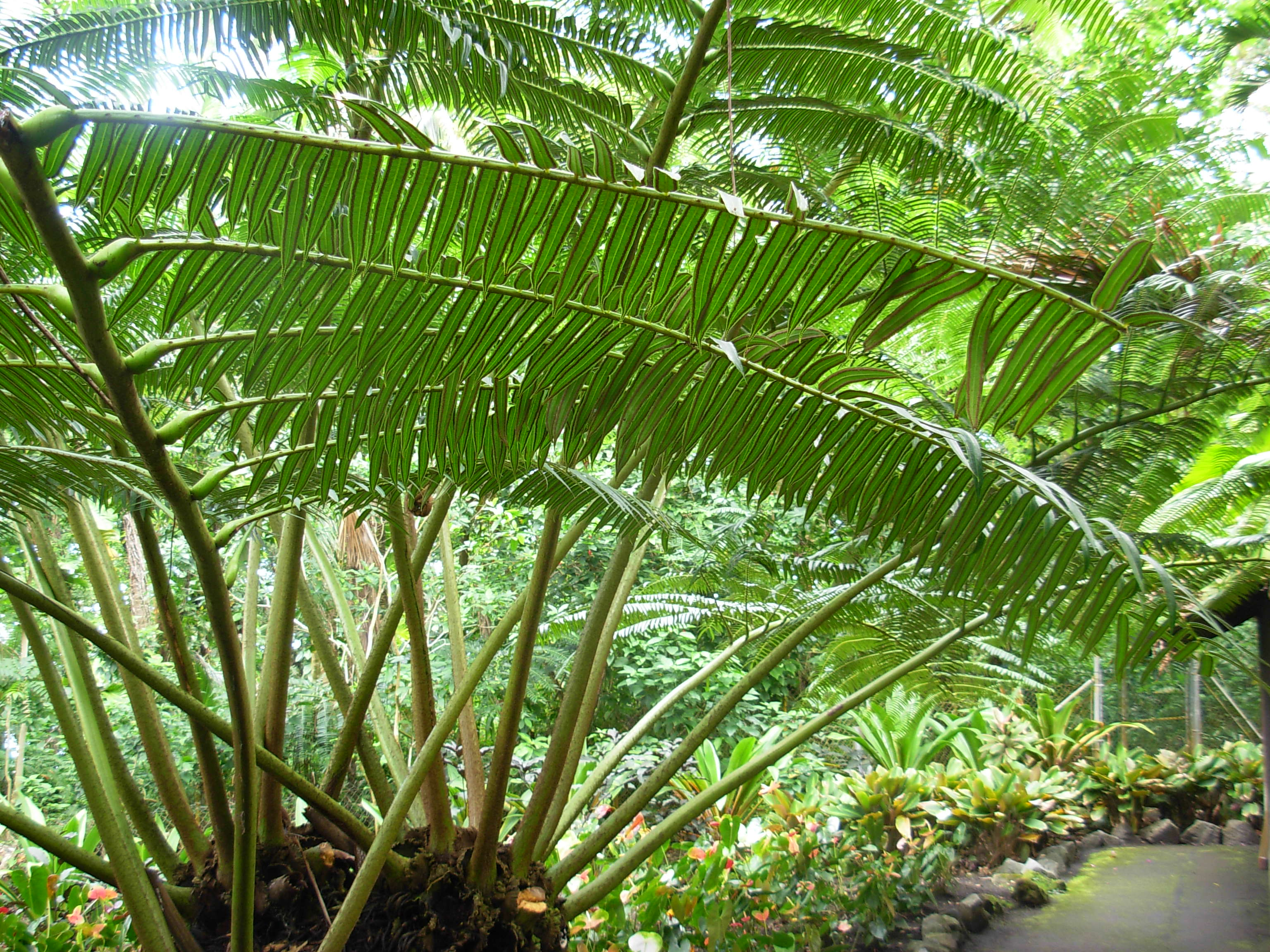

Conservation status
- Least Concern (NCA)

Scientific classification
- Kingdom: Plantae
- Clade: Embryophytes
- Clade: Tracheophytes
- Division: Polypodiophyta
- Class: Polypodiopsida
- Order: Marattiales
- Family: Marattiaceae
- Genus: Angiopteris
- Species: A. evecta

Binomial name
- Angiopteris evecta (G.Forst.) Hoffm.

Synonyms
- See Synonyms section below

= Angiopteris evecta =

King fern

Species of fern

Angiopteris evecta, commonly known as the king fern, giant fern, elephant fern, oriental vessel fern, Madagascar tree fern, or mule's foot fern, is a very large rainforest fern in the family Marattiaceae native to most parts of Southeast Asia and Oceania. It has a history dating back about 300 million years, and is believed to have the longest fronds of any fern in the world.

== Description ==
Angiopteris evecta is a self-supporting evergreen perennial fern with very large bipinnate fronds. The trunk-like rhizome is massive, measuring up to 1 m (3 ft 3 in) in diameter. The older portions of the rhizome lie on the ground while the newer growth may rise vertically up to 1.2 m (3 ft 11 in) high.

The arching, glossy green fronds, which emerge from the tip of the rhizome, may reach up to 9 m (30 ft) long and 2.5 m (8 ft 2 in) wide, with the fleshy green petiole (leaf stem) making up 2 m (6 ft 7 in) of that length. They are said to be the longest fern fronds in the world, and despite their enormous size they have no woody strengthening tissues in the fronds to keep them erect—instead they are supported entirely by the hydraulic pressure of the sap. On either side of the petiole where it arises from the rhizome there are flat, rounded, leathery, ear-shaped stipules, known as "auricles", which can measure up to 15 cm (5.9 in) in diameter.

The fronds are bipinnate with about 9 to 12 pairs of pinnae measuring up to 150 cm (59 in) long and 45 cm (18 in) wide. Each pinnae carries about 30 to 40 pairs of pinnules that measure around 13 by 2 cm (5.1 by 0.8 in), and both the main rachis and the secondary rachillae (midribs) are pulvinate (swollen at the base). This pulvinus is responsible for raising and lowering the frond, and is up to 20 cm (7.9 in) diameter.| Sporangia are borne on the underside of the pinnules, very close to the margin, in clusters of 5 to 8 opposite pairs. Overall dimensions of this fern can be up to 7 m (23 ft) high by 16 m (52 ft) wide.

=== Evolution ===
Fossilised fronds bearing a distinct similarity to this plant have been found in Paleozoic rocks from every continent, a time when ferns and their relatives were the dominant plants on the planet. The geographically isolated communities seen today point to favourable climatic conditions being more widespread in the past.

== Taxonomy ==
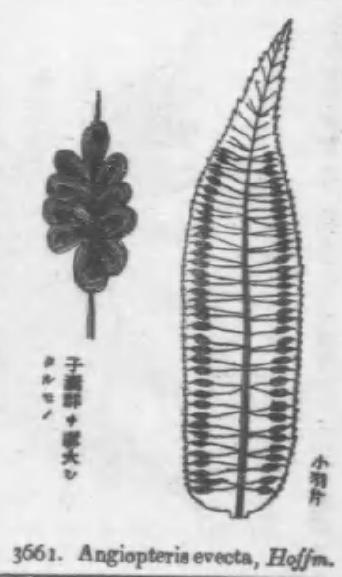

Angiopteris evecta was originally named and described as Polypodium evectum by Georg Forster in 1786, in his book Florulae Insularum Australium Prodromus. It was moved to the genus Angiopteris in 1794 by Georg Franz Hoffmann, publishing in the journal Commentationes Societatis Regiae Scientiarum Gottingensis. A. evecta is the type species of the genus Angiopteris.

=== Etymology ===
The genus name comes from Ancient Greek aggeion 'vessel', and pteris, 'fern', and is a reference to the sporangia. The species epithet is the Latin adjective evectus meaning to carry out, bring forth, raise, or elevate.

=== Synonyms ===
As of April 2023, Plants of the World Online lists 26 synonyms for Angiopteris evecta, which are considered by some authorities to potentially be distinct species, calling for a more thorough taxonomic investigation. This number is down from the 73 synonyms listed in 2020.

Homotypic

- Danaea evecta (G.Forst.) Spreng.
- Polypodium evectum G.Forst.

Heterotypic

- Callipteris heterophylla T.Moore
- Angiopteris acrocarpa de Vriese
- Angiopteris alata Nadeaud
- Angiopteris aurata de Vriese
- Angiopteris beecheyana de Vriese
- Angiopteris brongniartiana de Vriese
- Angiopteris canaliculata Holttum
- Angiopteris commutata C.Presl
- Angiopteris cupreata de Vriese
- Angiopteris elongata Hieron.
- Angiopteris erecta Desv.
- Angiopteris evanidostriata Hieron.
- Angiopteris evecta var. rurutensis E.D.Br.
- Angiopteris hellwigii Hieron.
- Angiopteris intricata C.Presl
- Angiopteris lasegueana de Vriese
- Angiopteris lauterbachii Hieron.
- Angiopteris longifolia Grev. & Hook.
- Angiopteris lorentzii Rosenst.
- Angiopteris naumannii Hieron.
- Angiopteris novocaledonica Hieron.
- Angiopteris palauensis Hieron.
- Angiopteris palmiformis (Cav.) C.Chr.
- Clementea palmiformis Cav.

== Distribution and habitat ==
Angiopteris evecta is native to southeast Asia and Oceania, from Sri Lanka and Bangladesh in the west through to Melanesia, Micronesia and Polynesia in the east, and from Japan in the north to northern and eastern Australia in the south. It has been introduced to most of the rest of tropical Asia, as well as Madagascar and parts of the tropical Americas. It has become naturalised in Hawaii, Jamaica, Costa Rica and Cuba.

The species grows in rainforest on very rich soils, often of volcanic origin and prefers a very warm wet climate. It is usually an understorey plant in well developed rainforest, especially along creek banks in deep sheltered gullies where there is good drainage and a plentiful supply of fresh water, but is occasionally found in more exposed situations. The preferred annual mean temperature range is 19–27 °C (66–81 °F) and annual precipitation between 1,000 and 5,400 mm (39 and 213 in). It grows at elevations from sea level to 1,500 m (4,900 ft).

== Cultural uses ==
The starchy rhizomes are eaten after long processing to remove toxins, used to perfume coconut oil, to flavour rice and to produce an intoxicating drink. The 1889 book The Useful Native Plants of Australia records Indigenous Australians ate the pith of this fern.

== Conservation ==
The conservation status of Angiopteris evecta varies from place to place. For example in Australia's Northern Territory it is listed as vulnerable, with only one small population in north eastern Arnhem Land; in New South Wales, where suitable habitat is restricted to a small area in the north east corner of the state and only a single, non-reproductive specimen is known, it is listed as endangered. However, in the state of Queensland, which lies in between the other two states and where there is an abundance of suitable habitat, it is listed as least concern.

As of 13 April 2023, this species has not been assessed by the International Union for Conservation of Nature (IUCN).

== Invasive potential ==
When introduced to an area with a suitable climate, Angiopteris evecta can establish dense stands that inhibit local species. It is listed as invasive in Costa Rica, Cuba, Jamaica and Hawaii, where in each case it has escaped from plantings in botanic gardens. It has also been introduced to many tropical countries and has repeatedly escaped from cultivation.

== Gallery ==
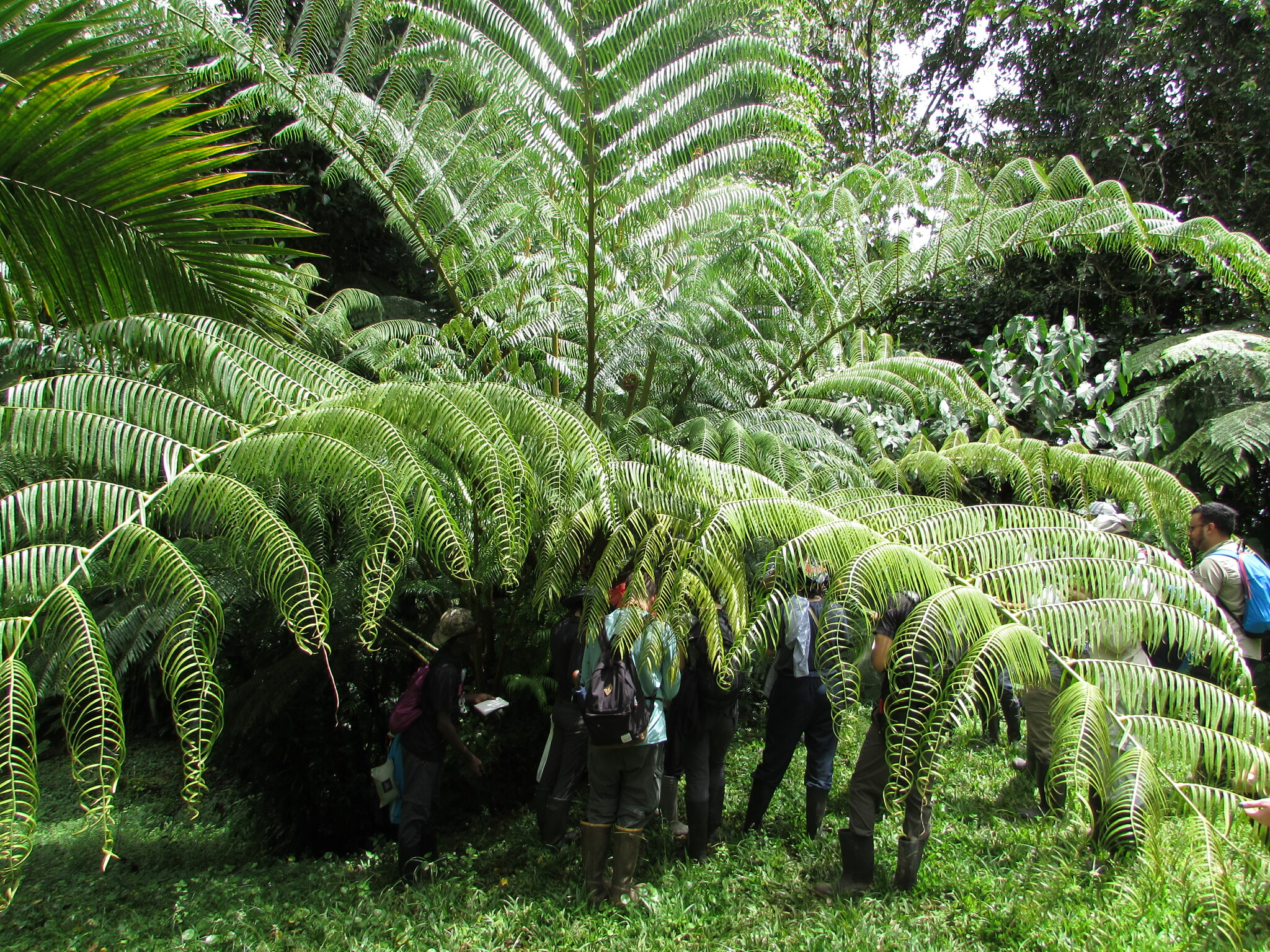
Large plant in Costa Rica dwarfing some observers

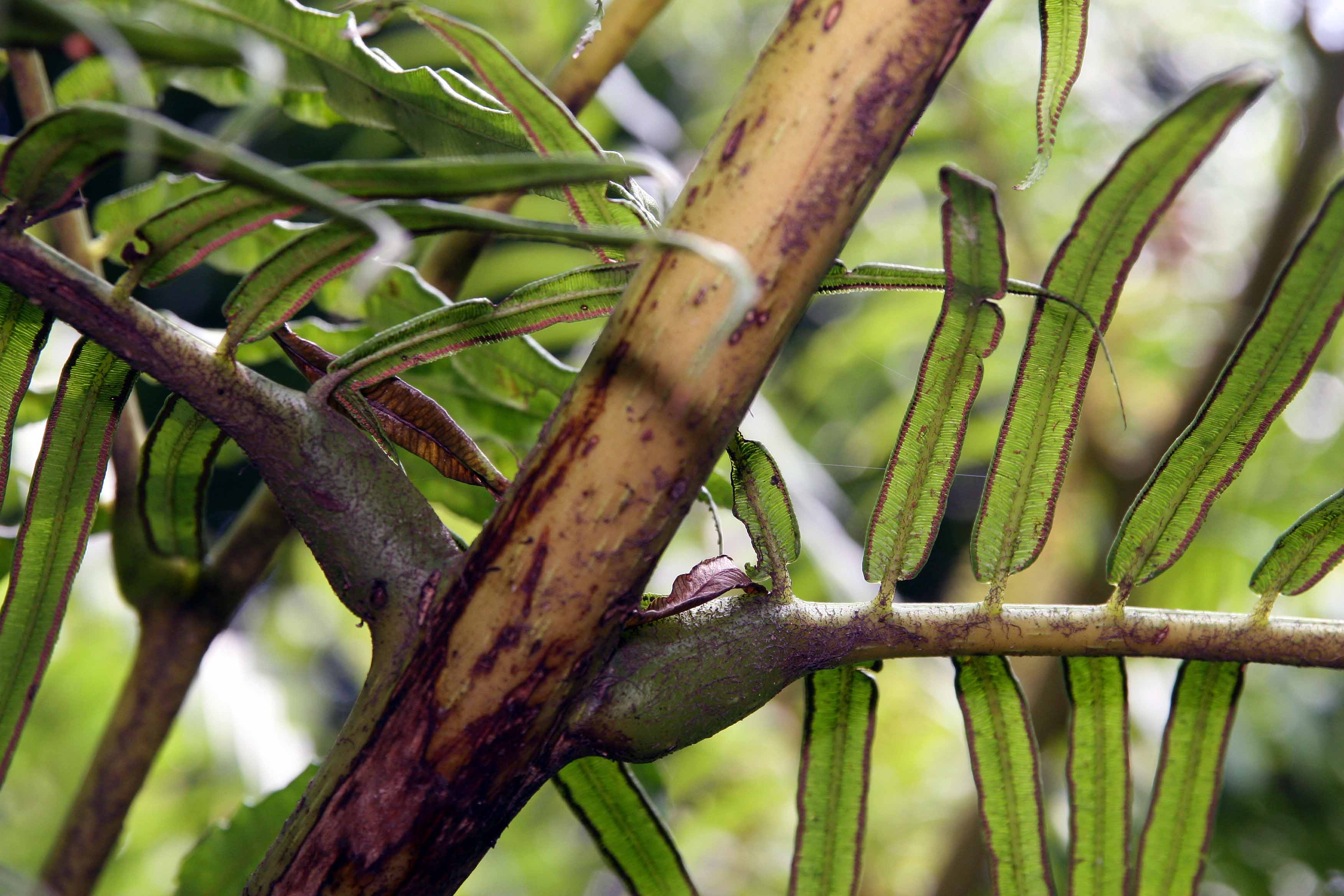
Pulvini on the rachillae (midribs of lateral branches)

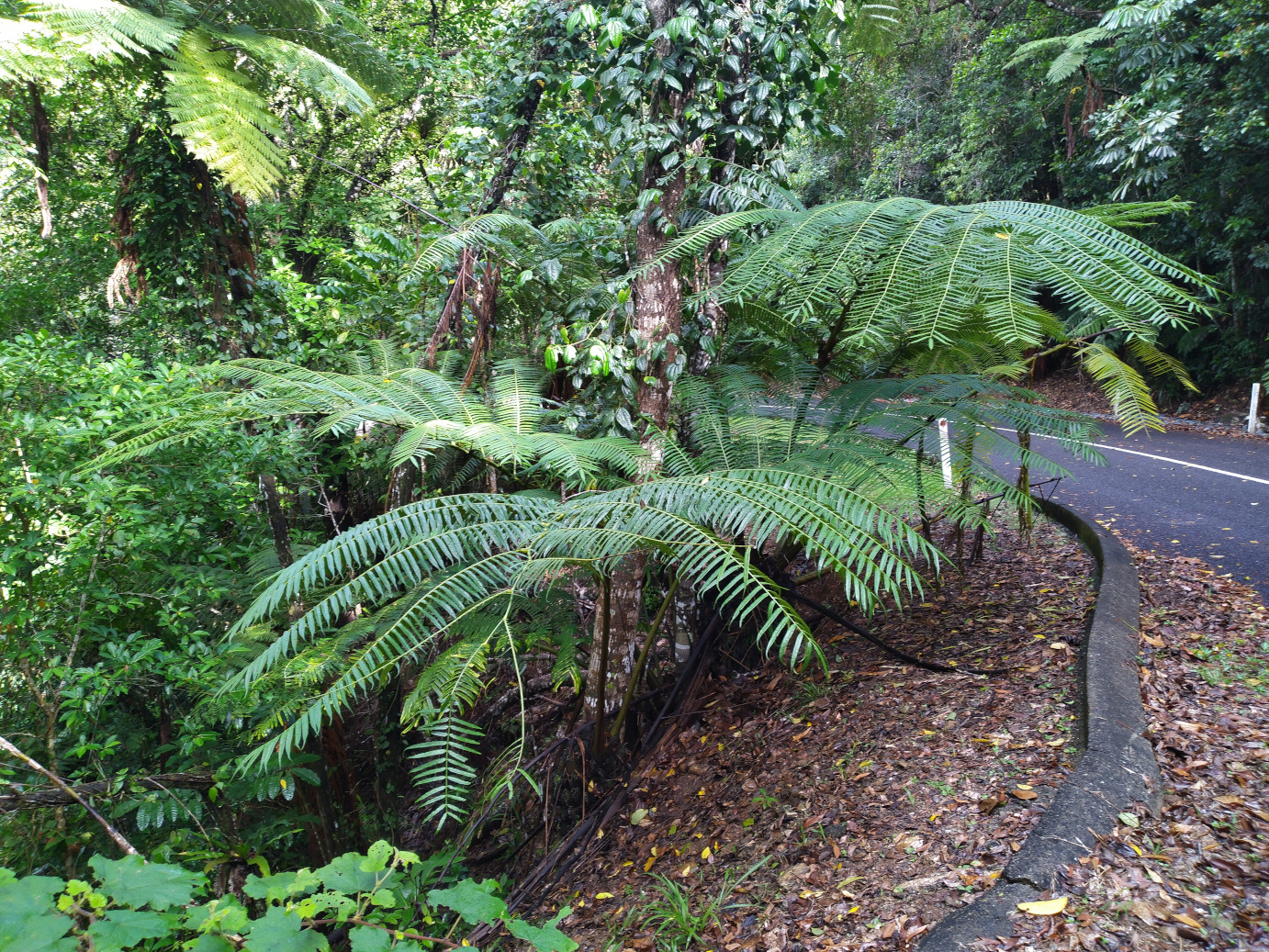
Growing in a steep gully on the Lamb Range, Queensland, Australia

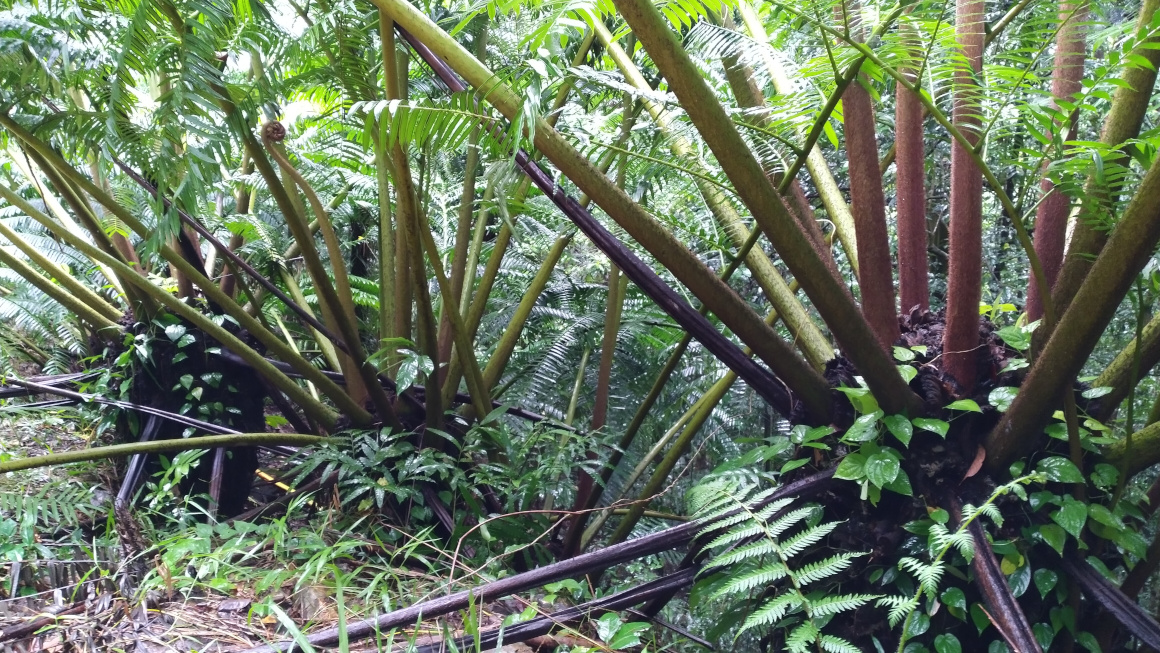
On the Alexandra Range near Cape Tribulation, Australia

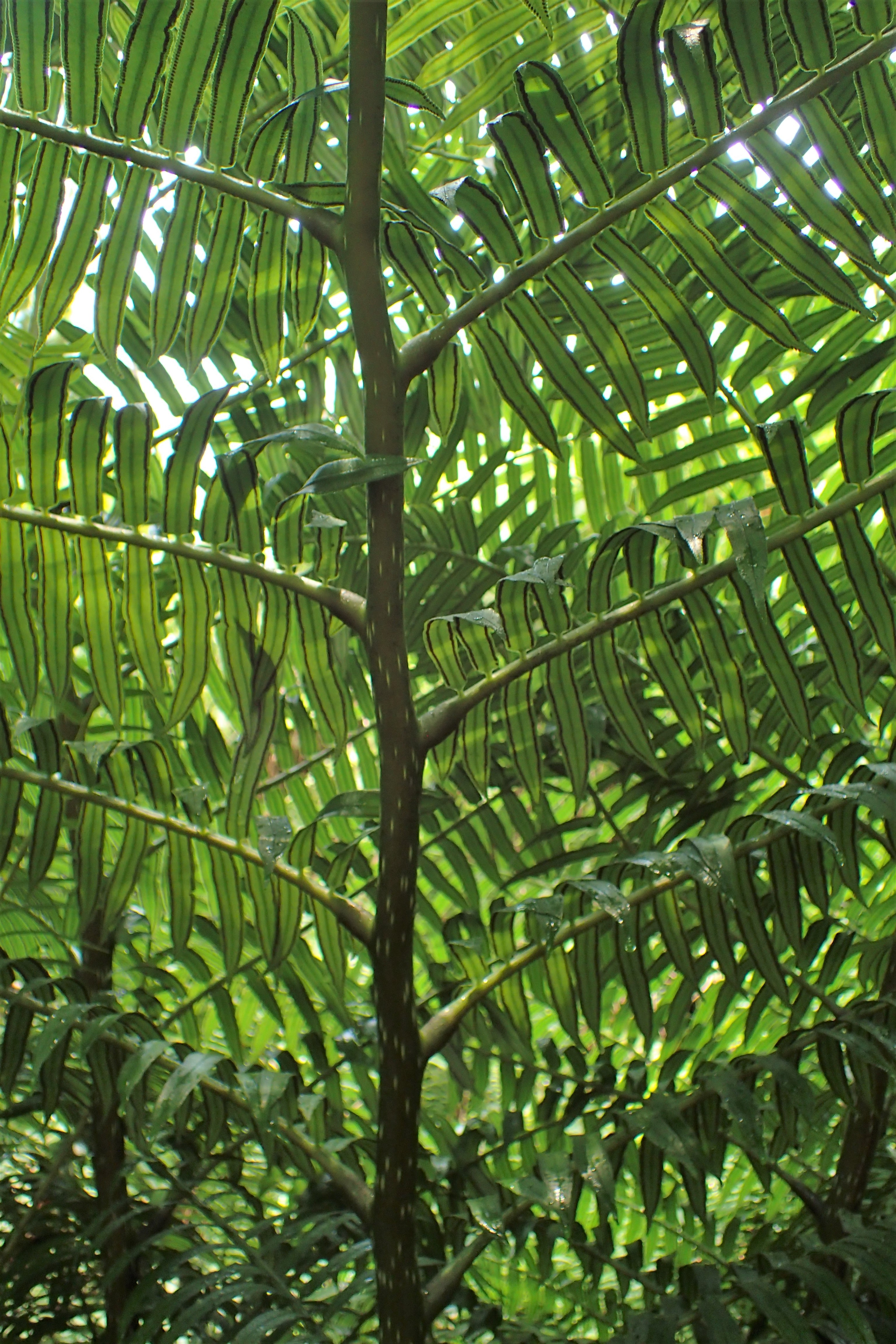
Underside of a frond

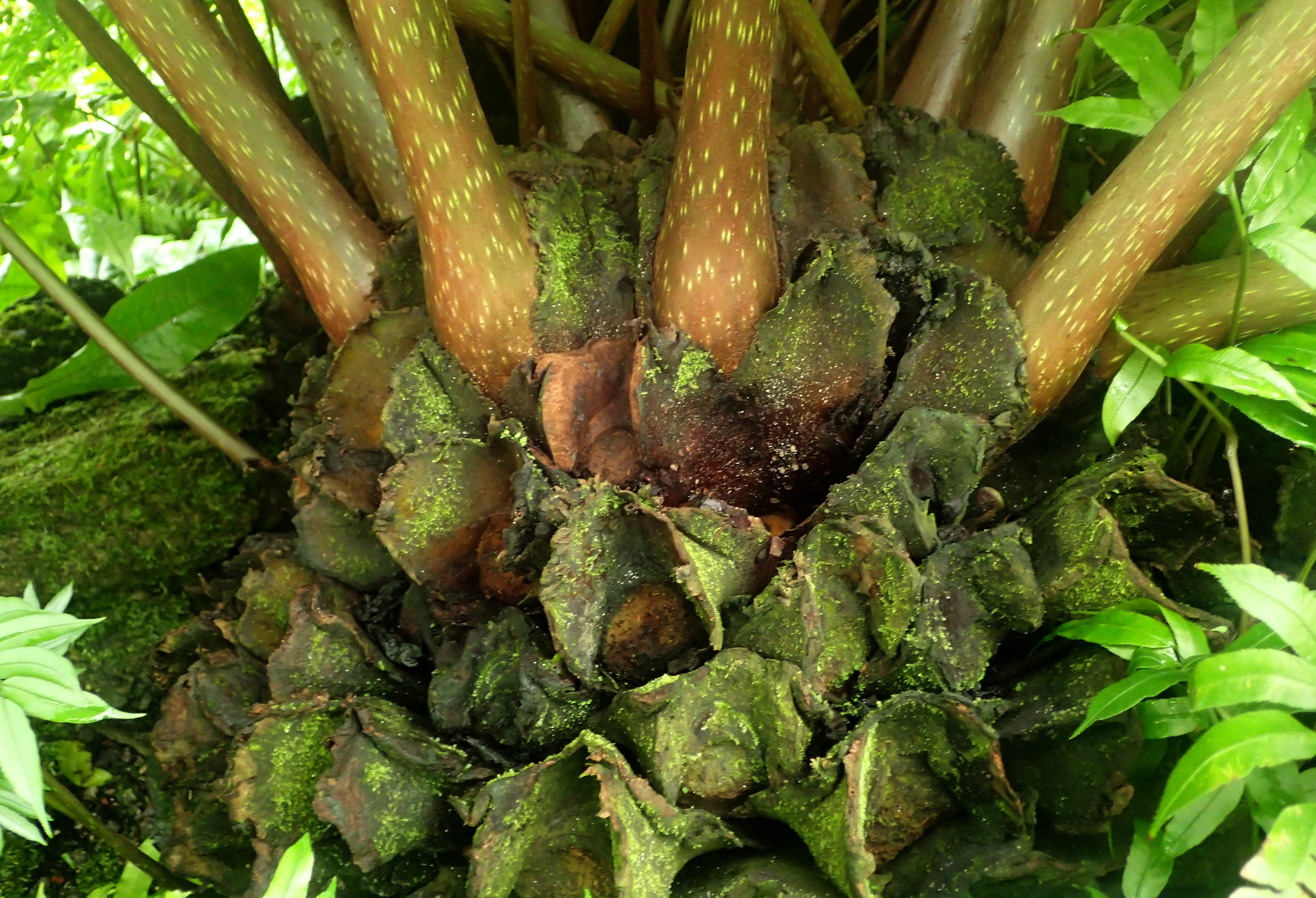
Growing at Garfield Park Conservatory. The swollen bases of the petioles are clearly seen here, as are the rounded stipules

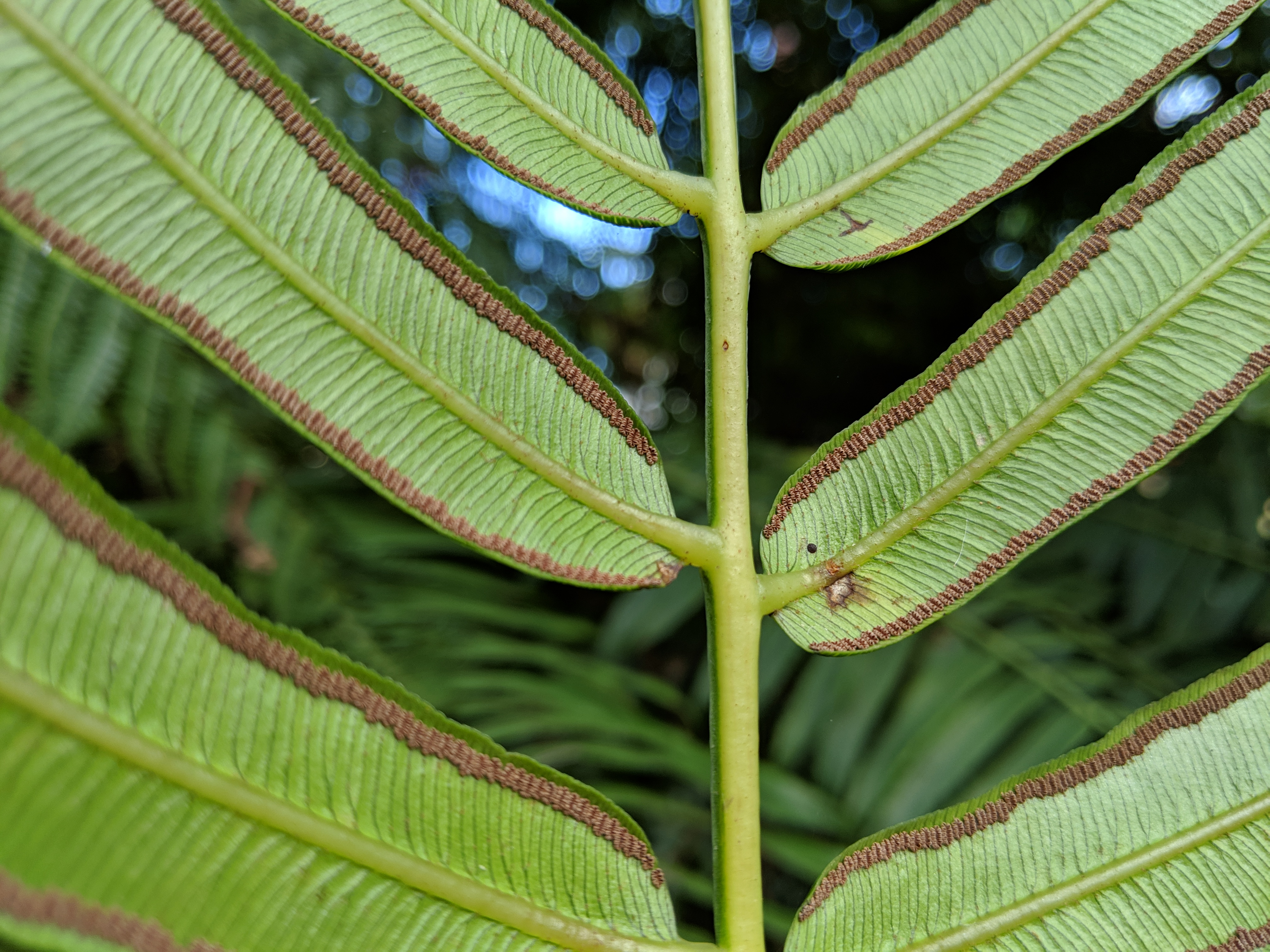
Underside of pinnules, showing sporangia and the swollen basal attachment. Royal Botanic Garden, Sydney

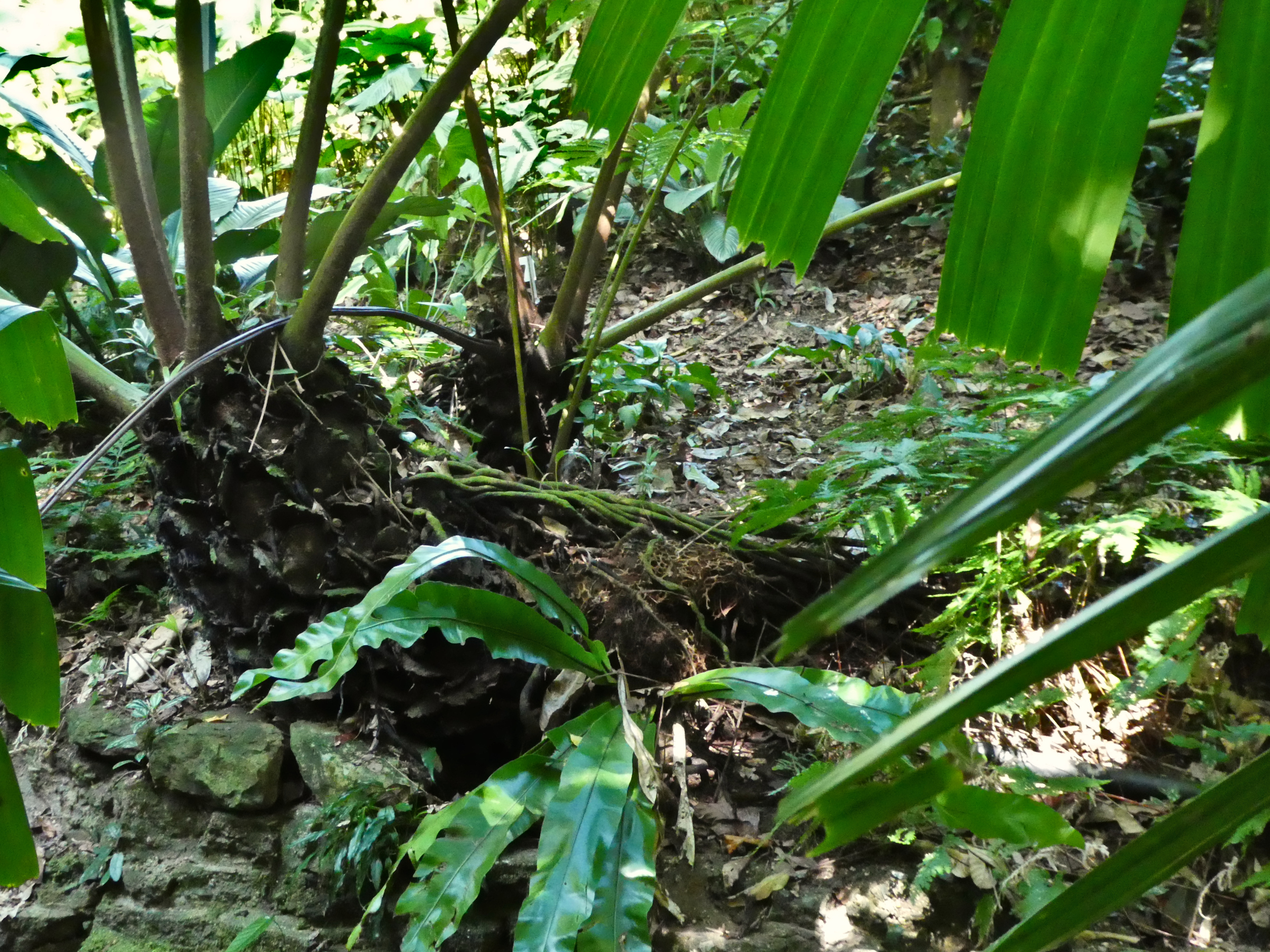
In Cairns Botanic Garden, August 2021. This image illustrates the prostrate older section of the rhizome and the erect younger portion.

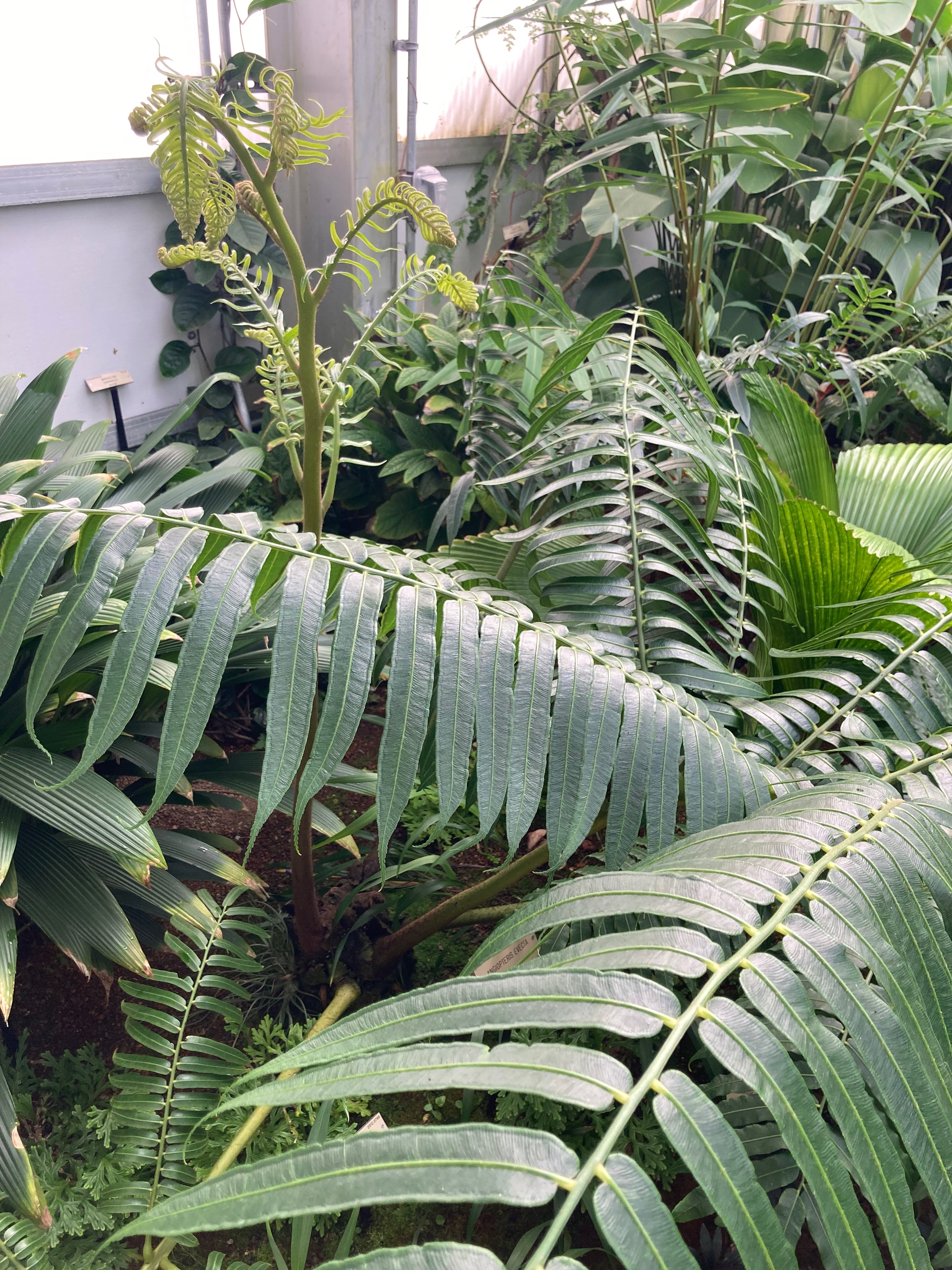
Detail of leaves at UC Berkeley Botanical Garden

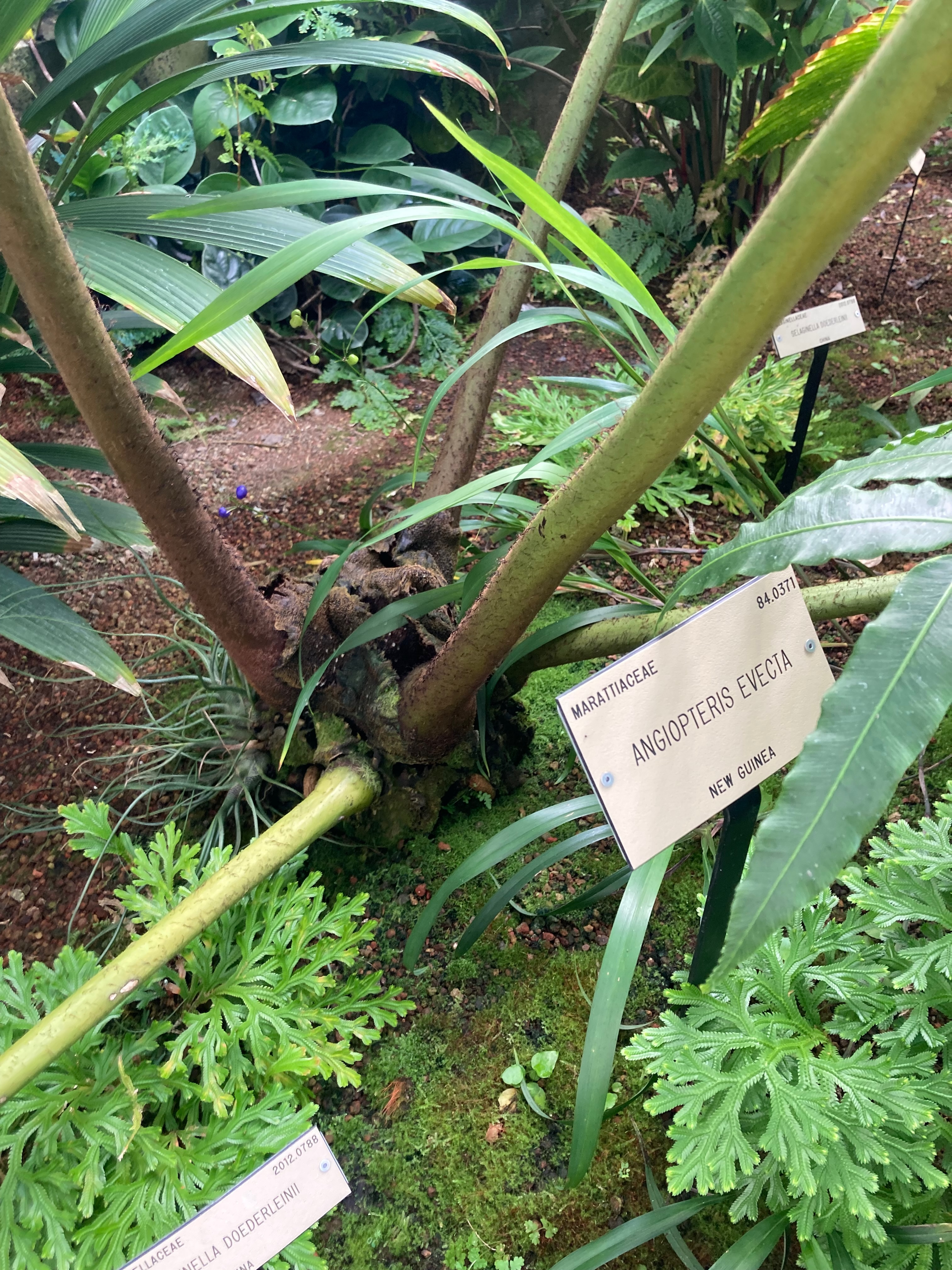
Base of plant
