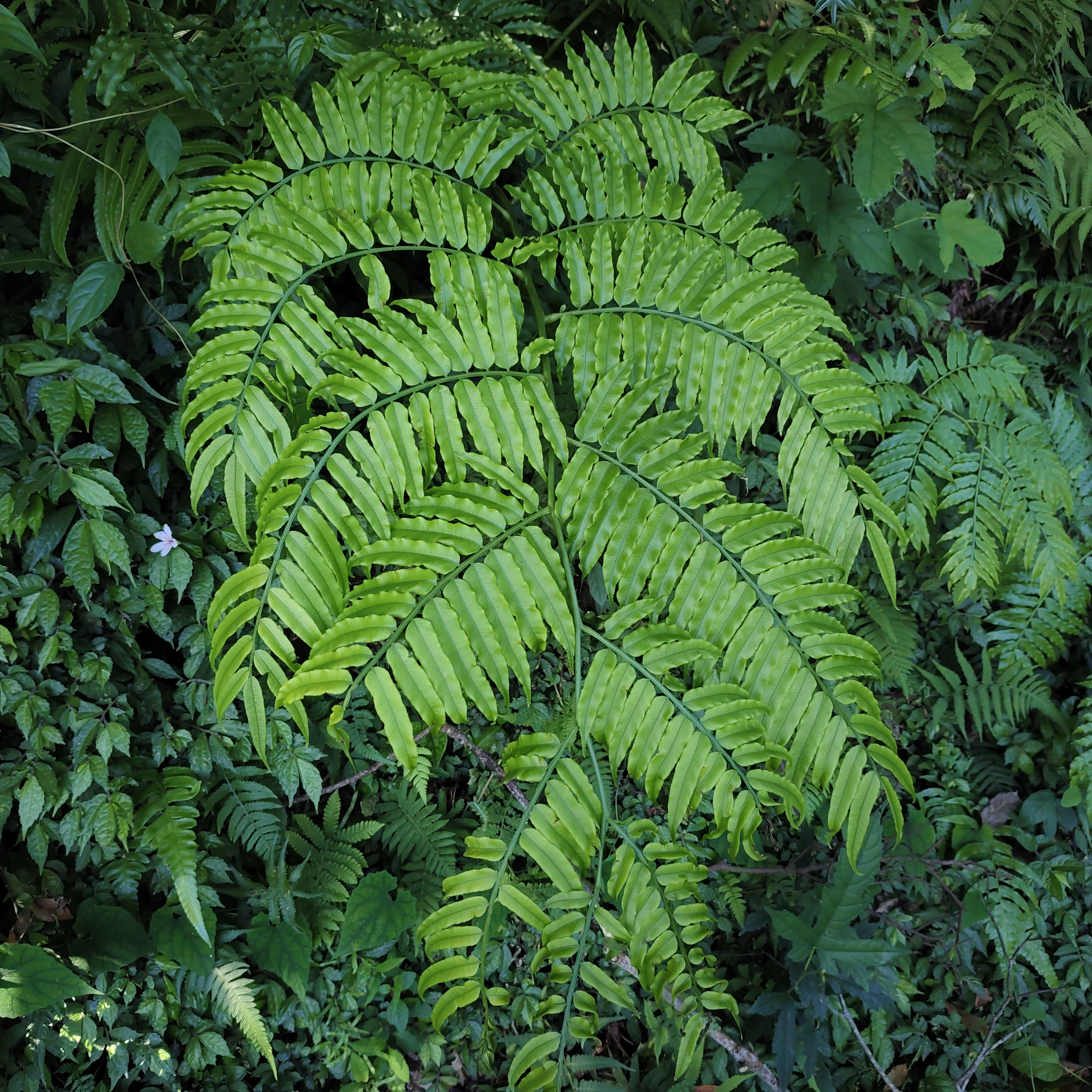
- Angiopteris lygodiifolia in Longtan District, Taoyuan City, Taiwan

Scientific classification
- Kingdom: Plantae
- Clade: Tracheophytes
- Division: Polypodiophyta
- Class: Polypodiopsida
- Order: Marattiales
- Family: Marattiaceae
- Genus: Angiopteris; Hoffm.

Type species
- Angiopteris evecta (Forster) Hoffmann

Species
- See text

Synonyms
- Archangiopteris Christ & Giesenh.; Clementea Cav.; Macroglossum Copel.; Protangiopteris Hayata; Protomarattia Hayata; Psilodochea C.Presl

= Angiopteris =

Genus of ferns

Angiopteris is a genus of huge evergreen ferns from the family Marattiaceae, found throughout the paleotropics from Madagascar to the South Pacific islands.

They feature a large, erect, woody rhizome with a wide base supported by thick roots. The fronds are deltoid, pinnate, 5–8 metres (16–26 ft) long, with spreading leaflets. At the base of the fronds is a pair of thick, leathery stipules — in the case of A. canaliculata, measuring up to 15 cm (5.9 in) long and wide. Species of smaller stature with elongate synangia and creeping rhizomes are sometimes segregated into the genus Archangiopteris, and a once-pinnate monotypic segregate genus has been called Macroglossum, but molecular data supports inclusion of these taxa within a broad concept of Angiopteris.

Angiopteris is unique among ferns in having explosively dispersed spores, thought to be caused by the cavitation of an airspace between spore layers. The basal chromosome number for this genus is 2n=80. The type species is Angiopteris evecta.

Angiopteris evecta has been introduced and naturalized in Hawaii, Jamaica, and parts of Central America, where it has become an invasive weed in lower elevation drainages.

== Taxonomy ==
The Smith et al. classification of 2006, based on molecular phylogeny, placed Angiopteris in Marattiaceae. Subsequent classifications have maintained this placement.

Angiopteris taxonomy is poorly understood, with nearly 200 poorly defined species having been named. As of October 2026, the Checklist of Ferns and Lycophytes of the World recognizes 56 species in Angiopteris. World Flora Online recognizes 53 species. Plants of the World Online recognizes 60 species and one hybrid.

=== Species ===
- Angiopteris annamensis C.Chr. & Tardieu
- Angiopteris arborescens (Blanco) Merr.
- Angiopteris bipinnata (Ching) J.M.Camus
- Angiopteris boninensis Hieron.
- Angiopteris brooksii Copel.
- Angiopteris cadierei (C.Chr. & Tardieu) Govaerts & Christenh.
- Angiopteris cartilagidens Christ (includes A. acutidentata Ching, recognized by POWO)
- Angiopteris caudatiformis Hieron. (includes A. robusta Ching, recognized by POWO)
- Angiopteris chauliodonta Copel.
- Angiopteris chingii J.M.Camus
- Angiopteris chongsengiana Senterre & I.Fabre
- Angiopteris cochinchinensis de Vriese
- Angiopteris confertinervia Ching ex C.Chr. & Tardieu
- Angiopteris crassipes Wall.
- Angiopteris danaeoides Z.R.He & Christenh.
- Angiopteris dianyuecola Z.R.He & W.M.Chu
- Angiopteris elliptica Alderw.
- Angiopteris esculenta Ching
- Angiopteris evecta (G.Forst.) Hoffm. (includes A. muricata de Vriese, recognized by POWO)
- Angiopteris ferox Copel.
- Angiopteris fokiensis Hieron. (includes A. nanchuanensis Z.Y.Liu, recognized by POWO)
- Angiopteris guangdongensis W.F.Chen & Y.H.Yan (not yet in WFO)
- Angiopteris helferiana C.Presl (includes A. wallichiana C.Presl, recognized by POWO)
- Angiopteris hokouensis Ching
- Angiopteris holttumii C.Chr.
- Angiopteris indica Desv.
- Angiopteris involuta Li J.Jiang & Z.R.He
- Angiopteris itoi (W.C.Shieh) J.M.Camus (considered a hybrid by POWO)
- Angiopteris javanica C.Presl
- Angiopteris latipinna (Ching) Z.R.He, W.M.Chu & Christenh.
- Angiopteris lygodiifolia Rosenst.
- Angiopteris madagascariensis de Vriese
- Angiopteris marchionica E.D.Br.
- Angiopteris microura Copel.
- Angiopteris mutata Alderw. (not yet recognized by CFLW or WFO)
- Angiopteris nodosipetiolata Ting Wang tris, H.F.Chen & Y.H.Yan
- Angiopteris oblanceolata Ching & Chu H.Wang
- Angiopteris opaca Copel.
- Angiopteris palmiformis (Cav.) C.Chr.
- Angiopteris paucinervis W.M.Chu & Z.R.He
- Angiopteris pruinosa Kunze
- Angiopteris rapensis E.D.Br.
- Angiopteris remota Ching & Chu H.Wang
- Angiopteris smithii Racib.
- Angiopteris somae (Hayata) Makino & Nemoto
- Angiopteris sparsisora Ching
- Angiopteris subcuspidata Rosenst.
- Angiopteris subrotundata (Ching) Z.R.He & Christenh.
- Angiopteris sugongii Gui L.Zhang, J.Y.Xiang & Ting Wang
- Angiopteris tamdaoensis (Hayata) J.Y.Xiang & T.Wang
- Angiopteris tonkinensis (Hayata) J.M.Camus
- Angiopteris undulatostriata Hieron.
- Angiopteris versteegii Alderw.
- Angiopteris wangii Ching
- Angiopteris weimingii Li J.Jiang & Z.R.He (not yet recognized in POWO and WFO)
- Angiopteris winkleri Rosenst.
- Angiopteris yunnanensis Hieron.

=== Fossil species ===
- †Angiopteris angustifoliopsis Kuzitchkina
- †Angiopteris iberica Delle & Doludenko
- †Angiopteris parvispinellatus (Maljavkina) Faddeeva
- †Angiopteris richthofenii von Schenk
- †Angiopteris taeniopteroides Yang

=== Phylogeny ===
The following phylogeny of Angiopteris is based on GenBank plastid data.

- Angiopteris
  - A. palmiformis
  - - A. smithii
    - - - - A. chingii
          - A. involuta
        - - A. latipinna
          - - A. nodosipetiolata
            - - A. bipinnata
              - - A. rapensis
                - - A. tonkinensis
                  - - A. tamdaoensis
                    - A. subcuspidata
      - - - A. pruinosa
          - A. ferox
          - A. boninensis
          - A. evecta
          - A. marchionica
        - - A. caudatiformis
          - - A. madagascariensis
            - - A. annamensis
              - - - A. dianyuecola
                  - A. yunnanensis
                - - - A. itoi
                    - - A. hokouensis
                      - A. sparsisora
                  - - A. fokiensis
                    - - - A. lygodiifolia
                        - A. oblanceolata
                      - - - A. cochinchinensis
                          - A. somae
                        - - A. wangii
                          - - A. cartilagidens
                            - A. helferiana
