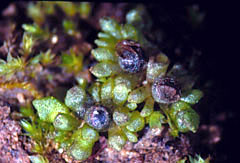
- Female plants of Sphaerocarpos texanus bearing mature sporophytes

Scientific classification
- Kingdom: Plantae
- Division: Marchantiophyta
- Class: Marchantiopsida
- Order: Sphaerocarpales
- Family: Sphaerocarpaceae
- Genus: Sphaerocarpos
- Species: S. texanus

Binomial name
- Sphaerocarpos texanus Aust.

Synonyms
- Sphaerocarpus berterii Aust., 1873; Sphaerocarpus californicus Aust., 1879; Sphaerocarpus europaeus Lorbeer, 1934; Sphaerocarpus terrestris Bisch., 1827

= Sphaerocarpos texanus =

Species of liverwort

Sphaerocarpos texanus, the Texas balloonwort, is a species of liverwort in the Sphaerocarpaceae family, found in the Americas, northern Africa and Europe.

== Description ==
Sphaerocarpos texanus are small, thalloid, dioecious liverworts. The species is sexually dimorphic, with male plants usually 3–5 mm in diameter, females up to 12 mm in diameter. Both male (bearing antheridia) and female (bearing archegonia) plants are bright green, with the thallus branching up to several times. The plant is a winter annual, appearing in autumn and dying in spring. Notably, the spores occur in sets of four, called tetrads. Unlike most other species of liverwort, the spores stay in these tetrads until they germinate.

== Habitat ==
The plant is found on flat, lightly shaded soil. Usually by roadsides.

== Distribution ==
Sphaerocarpos texanus has a wide range, probably the widest of any species in its genus. It has been found on several continents, in the United States, Uruguay, England, Germany, France and Morocco.
