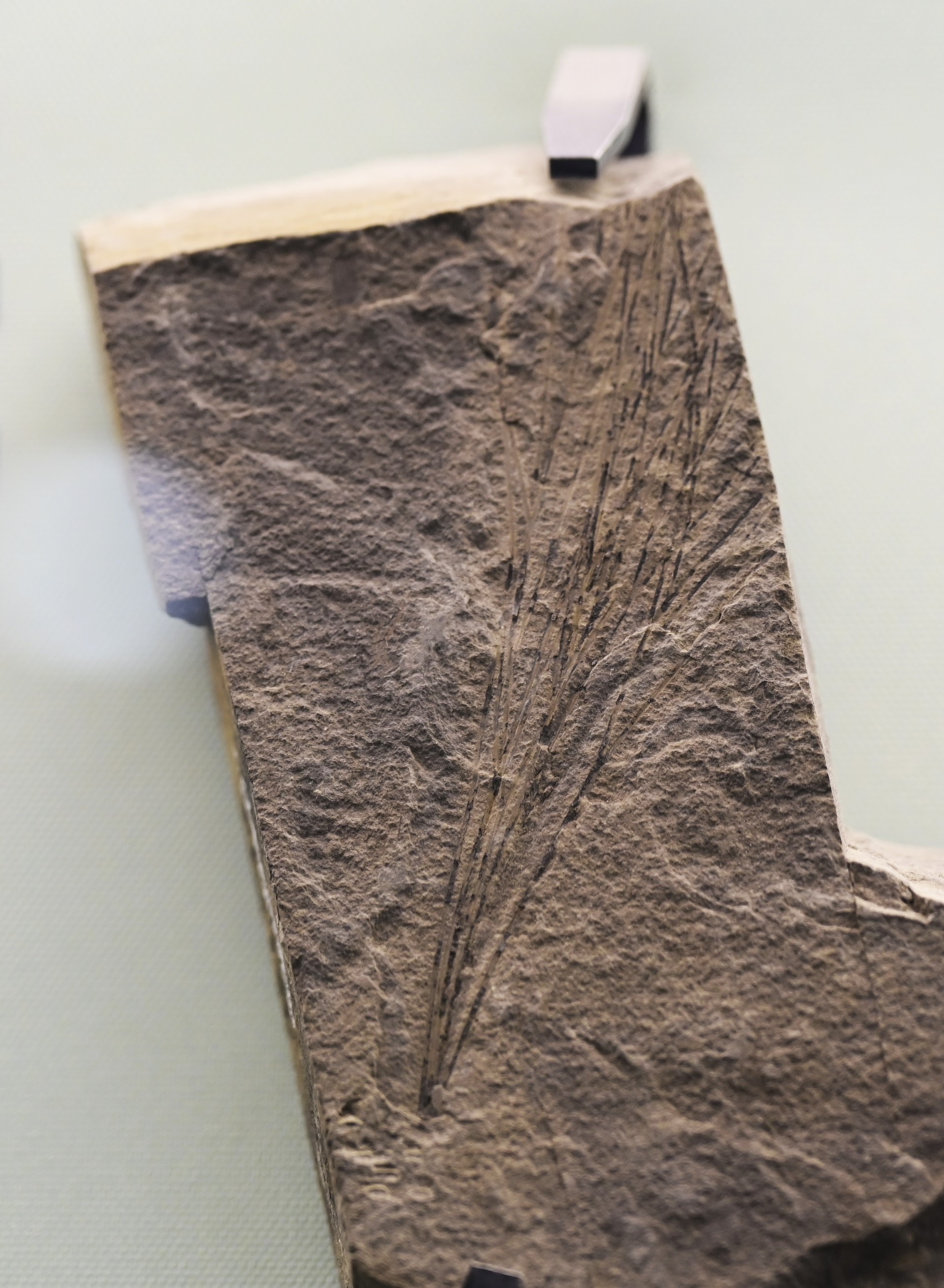
- Fossil of Czekanowskia, National Natural History Museum of China

Scientific classification
- Kingdom: Plantae
- Clade: Embryophytes
- Clade: Tracheophytes
- Clade: Spermatophytes
- Clade: Gymnosperms
- Order: †Czekanowskiales; Pant, 1957

Genera
- Czekanowskiaceae; Czekanowskia (leaves); Phoenicopsis (leaves); Solenites (leaves); Sphenarion (leaves); Brinkia (ovulate cone); Leptostrobus (ovulate cone); unplaced genera; Arctobaiera (leaves); Ixostrobus (male cone)

Synonyms
- Leptostrobales Meyen, 1984

= Czekanowskiales =

Czekanowskiales Temporal range: Late Triassic–Maastrichtian

Extinct order of plants

Czekanowskiales, also known as Leptostrobales, are an extinct order of seed plants. Members of the order are distinguished by persistent leaves borne on deciduous short shoots, subtended by scale-like leaves. The leaves are highly dissected (divided into partitions). They likely grew as trees and shrubs. The main ovulate structure of Czekanowskiales, Leptostrobus, consists of bivalved seed-bearing round capsule-like structures arranged along a long axis. The link between the leaves and cones was first made by Tom Harris in 1951, to form the Czekanowskiales.

The fossil record of Czekanowskiales is largely confined to the Northern Hemisphere, and they inhabited warm-temperate and temperate climates under humid conditions. The oldest possible records of the group are ovulate cones from the Late Permian of Italy, but the group is primarily known from the Late Triassic onwards, and were abundant during the Jurassic and Early Cretaceous. Only a handful of species are known from the Late Cretaceous, confined to the northern Russian Far East, corresponding to the decline of other seed plant groups during the explosive radiation of flowering plants. The affinities of Czekanowskiales to other seed plants are obscure. A close relationship to the Ginkgoales has been proposed, based on similar preserved molecular signatures of fossil cuticles, with some authors placing Ginkgoales and Czekanowskiales into the broader grouping Ginkgophyta.
