= Grace Wigglesworth =

English palaeobotanist (1878 – 1972)

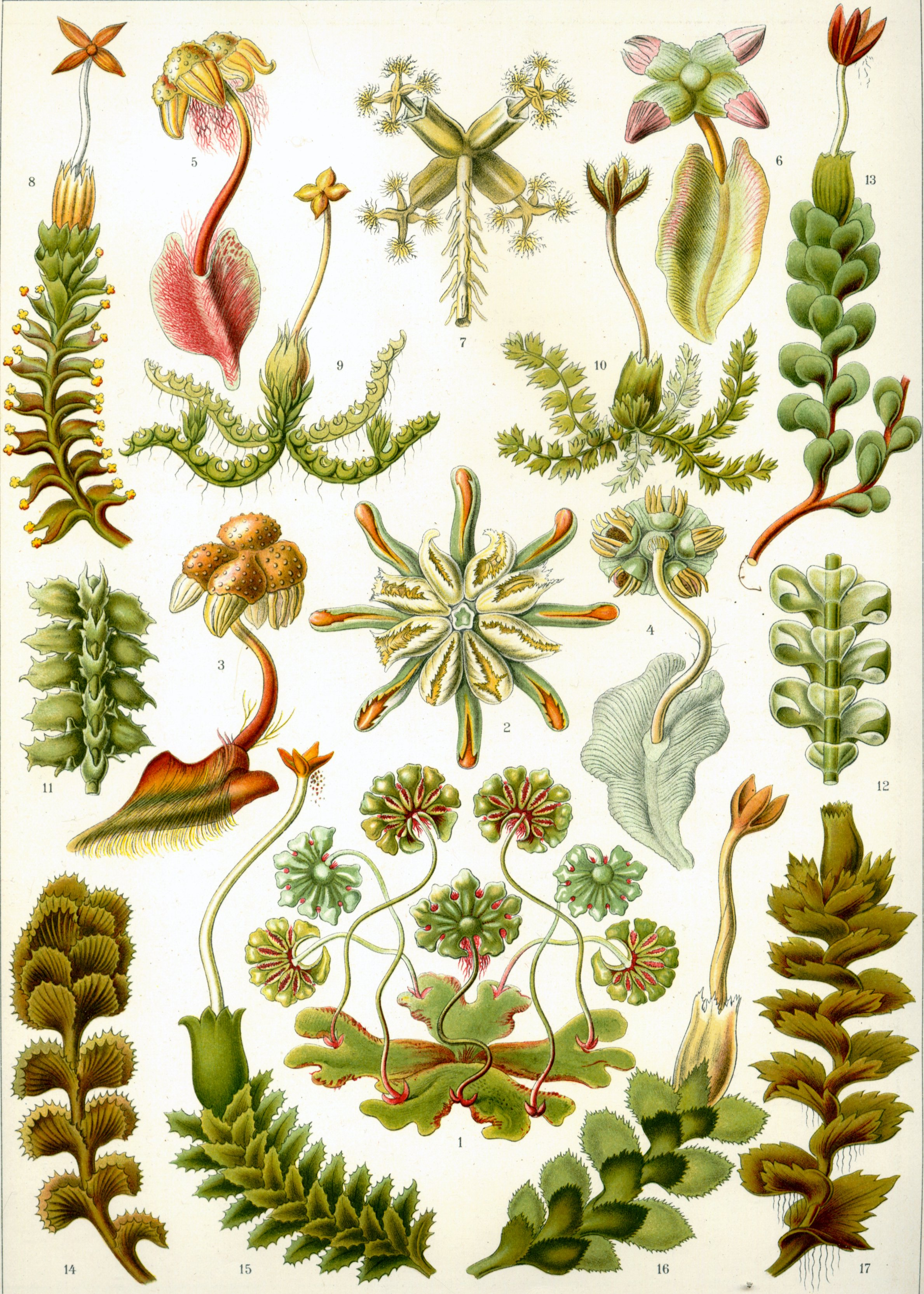
Grace Wigglesworth described several new species of liverwort.

Grace Wigglesworth (1878 – 1972) was an English palaeobotanist who published on early land plants, especially bryophytes. She spent over thirty years working as a curator at the Manchester Museum, where she cared for and published for botanical collections in the Herbarium.

== Education and early career ==
Educated at Manchester High School, she studied at Owens College, gaining a BSc in 1903 and an MSc in palaeobotany in 1906. She was one of several women supported in their studies by Manchester’s botany professor, William Henry Lang.

Wigglesworth was an honorary research fellow at the University until 1907, during which time she published several papers on early land plants. From 1907 – 1910 she had a stint as botany lecturer at the London Day Training College.

== Manchester Museum ==
From 1910 to 1944 she was Assistant Keeper at the Manchester Museum, where she fostered links between the botany, geology and zoology departments, also giving public lectures and demonstrations on palaeobotany, including lectures about the history of botany at the University of Manchester in 1926 and 1927.

At the Museum, she continued to publish. She especially worked with the collections donated to the Museum, including Lang's and those of Leopold Hartley Grindon James Cosmo Melvill, which she received into the museum. Her papers included the description of new species, such as Sphaerocarpos drewei.

She retired in 1944, her retirement being delayed a year after the age limit because of World War II, and she continued helping at the Herbarium in the 1950s after her retirement.

== Select publications ==
- 'Notes on the Rhizome of Matonia pectina, R. Br,' The New Phytologist 1:7 (1902) 157–160
- 'The cotyledons of Ginkgo biloba and Cycas revoluta,' Annals of Botany 17:68 (1903), 789–791
- 'Notes on Papillae in the Epidermoidal Layer of the Calami,' Annals of Botany 18:72 (1904) 645–648
- 'The Young Sporophytes of Lycopodium complanatum and Lycompodium clavatum,' Annals of Botany xxi (1907) 211–234
- 'A new Californian species of sphaerocarpus, together with an annotated list of the specimens of sphaerocarpus in the Manchester museum,' Publications in Botany 16:3
- 'South African Species of Riella, including an account of the developmental stages of three of the species,' Botanical Journal of the Linnean Society 51 (1937) 309–332
