= Winifred Pennington =

British biologist

- Born: Winifred Anne Pennington; 8 October 1915; Barrow-in-Furness, England
- Died: 1 May 2007 (aged 91)
- Education: University of Reading
- Spouse: Thomas Gaskell Tutin
- Awards: Fellow of the Royal Society
- Scientific career
- Fields: Biology; limnology
- Thesis: An investigation of some problems of freshwater algae, with special reference to the process of sedimentation
- Doctoral advisor: Tom Harris

Winifred Anne Tutin (née Pennington) FRS (8 October 1915 – 1 May 2007) was a British limnologist and biologist.

== Life ==
Pennington was born in Barrow-in-Furness on 8 October 1915, the daughter of Albert Roger Pennington, Post Office supervisor, and his wife, Margaret. In 1938, she graduated from the University of Reading in botany. As an undergraduate she undertook published research on algae and the ecology of mosses. Supervised by Tom Harris, she was awarded her PhD in 1941 by the University of Reading for her thesis titled An investigation of some problems of freshwater algae, with special reference to the process of sedimentation. In the same year she, along with colleagues at the FBA, published the landmark paper The Study of Lake Deposits in the academic journal Nature.

Whilst attending Easter courses at the Freshwater Biological Association (FBA) near Lake Windemere Pennington met Limnologist Clifford H. Mortimer and plant ecologist William Pearsall, both of whom were to have major influences on her subsequent research. She later became a field assistant at the FBA and here she was able to pursue her joint interests in Phycology and the natural history and sediments of freshwater lakes.

After a period working at the FBA in Windermere and at the then Botany School in Cambridge Pennington went on to become one of a new generation of respected women researchers. Moving to Leicester in 1945, she worked as a demonstrator and temporary lecturer at Leicester University from 1947, part-time lecturer in 1948, special lecturer in 1961, honorary reader in 1971, and honorary professor in 1980, a title she held until her death.

On 25 February 1942 she married Thomas Gaskell Tutin, a botanist at the University of Leicester who was also destined to be elected FRS. They had a son and three daughters. Her final years were spent in the village of Kingsclere where she remained actively involved in research, co-authoring important papers until 2003.

Pennington died in Basingstoke, Hampshire on 1 May 2007.

== Works ==
- W. H. Pearsall (1971). Mountains and Moorlands: With Revisions by Winifred Pennington "Mrs : T.G. Tutin". Collins.
- W. H. Pearsall and Winifred Pennington (1973). The Lake District: A Landscape History. Collins. ISBN 978-0-0021-3133-9.
- Winifred Pennington (1 July 1975). The History of British Vegetation. Taylor & Francis Group. ISBN 978-0-8448-0658-7.

== Awards ==
In 1974 Pennington was elected as a foreign member of the Royal Danish Academy.

In 1979, she was elected Fellow of the Royal Society. Her citation read:

"Dr. Tutin is distinguished for her contributions on the history of lake ecosystems and vegetation in northern Britain. Her early researches were on the sedimentation and ecological history of Windermere since the end of the last glaciation. She demonstrated a late-glacial oscillation in northern Britain for the first time and she was able to demonstrate the associated sedimentary and vegetational events. She later extended these studies to examine in detail the vegetational history of the Lake District. This work is remarkable for its palynological detail and field sampling programme, and for the clear correlations which emerged between vegetational history, climatic history and man's occupation of the area. From this work Dr. Tutin developed pioneering palaeolimnological studies of Lake District lakes, and demonstrated how chemical studies of lake sediments revealed much about the vegetation and soil history of catchments. She later extended this field of study to lakes in northern Scotland. This work has proved very stimulating and productive and is now of fundamental importance. More recently Dr. Tutin has been concerned with applying absolute pollen frequency methods, palaeomagnetic dating methods and tracer element studies to palaeolimnological problems. She has again been a pioneer in the development of these methods and has obtained results significant especially for the recent history of lakes and their catchments."
