= Henry Smith Holden =

British botanist

Henry Smith Holden CBE FRSE FLS (30 November 1887 – 16 May 1963) was a British botanist. Specialising in forensics, he became director of laboratories in New Scotland Yard in 1946.

== Early life and education ==
Holden was born at Castleton near Rochdale, the son of Henry Charlton Holden, a clerk to a woollen merchant, and his wife, Betsy Cockcroft. He was educated at Manchester Grammar School and then won a scholarship to Manchester University to study science, where he graduated with a BSc in Botany. His father died during his university course, and Henry took over the role of maintaining his mother and the cost of educating his younger brother, Ernest Holden, as soon as he was able.

== Career ==
In 1910, he began lecturing in botany at University College, Nottingham. While he was there, he influenced Tom Harris to follow his scientific interests seriously, into a career in paleobotany.

His career was interrupted by the First World War, during which he served (1916–19) as a bacteriologist at the Royal Naval Hospital in Portsmouth.

Returning to Nottingham after the war, he began to specialise. In 1921, he received an honorary doctorate (DSc) from Manchester University. In 1927, he set up a department of industrial bacteriology. In the same year, he was elected a Fellow of the Royal Society of Edinburgh. His proposers were Sir William Wright Smith, Robert Graham, Malcolm Wilson, James Montagu Frank Drummond, and James Robert Matthews.

In 1928, he was created head of the biology department, and in 1932, he was given a full professorship as professor of botany, also taking over the botany department in 1934. After some earlier police consultation on issues relating to water pollution and food contamination, he was asked by the Home Office to set up Britain’s first forensic laboratory in Nottingham in 1936, serving all of England and Wales. This was known as the East Midland Forensic Science Laboratory.

== Later life ==
He retired with his wife to Kenley in Surrey.

He died on 16 May 1963 at Dene Hospital in Caterham following a brief illness.

== Family ==
In 1917, he married Annie Janet Hamer, daughter of Richard Hamer, a civil engineer. They had one son and one daughter.

== Awards and legacy ==
- Fellow of the Royal Society of Edinburgh, 1927
- Commander of the Order of the British Empire 1958

The University of Nottingham holds an annual lecture named the H. S. Holden Botanical Lecture in his honour.
