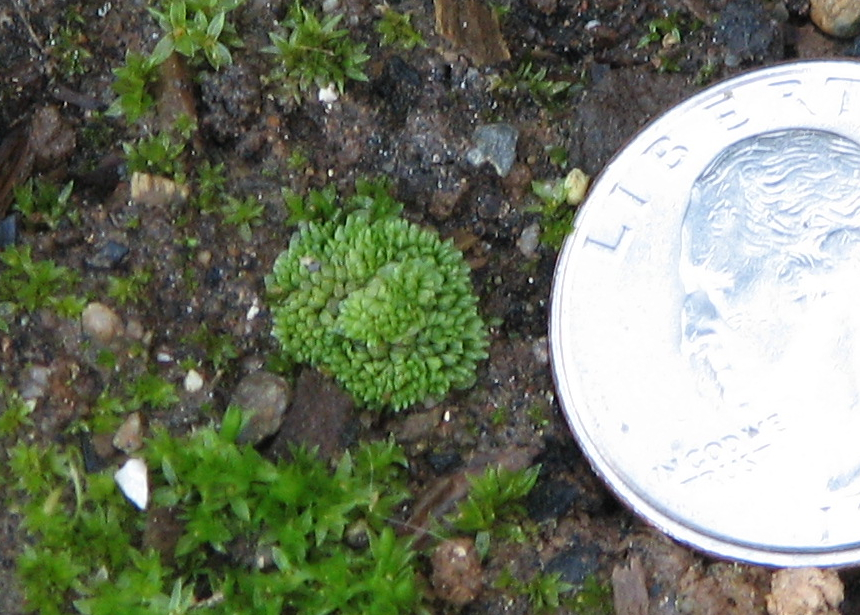
- A female Sphaerocarpos texanus next to a US quarter for scale

Scientific classification
- Kingdom: Plantae
- Division: Marchantiophyta
- Class: Marchantiopsida
- Order: Sphaerocarpales
- Family: Sphaerocarpaceae
- Genus: Sphaerocarpos [ Micheli ] Boehm. ex Ludwig

Species
- See text

= Sphaerocarpos =

Genus of liverworts

Sphaerocarpos is a genus of plants known as bottle liverworts. There are eight or nine species in this genus.

== Classification ==
Sphaerocarpos is one of two extant genera in the family Sphaerocarpaceae. The following species are currently recognized:

- Sphaerocarpos cristatus
- Sphaerocarpos donnelli
- Sphaerocarpos drewiae
- Sphaerocarpos hians
- Sphaerocarpos michelii
- Sphaerocarpos muccilloi
- Sphaerocarpos stipitatus
- Sphaerocarpos texanus
