= Harris Garden =

UK university botanical garden

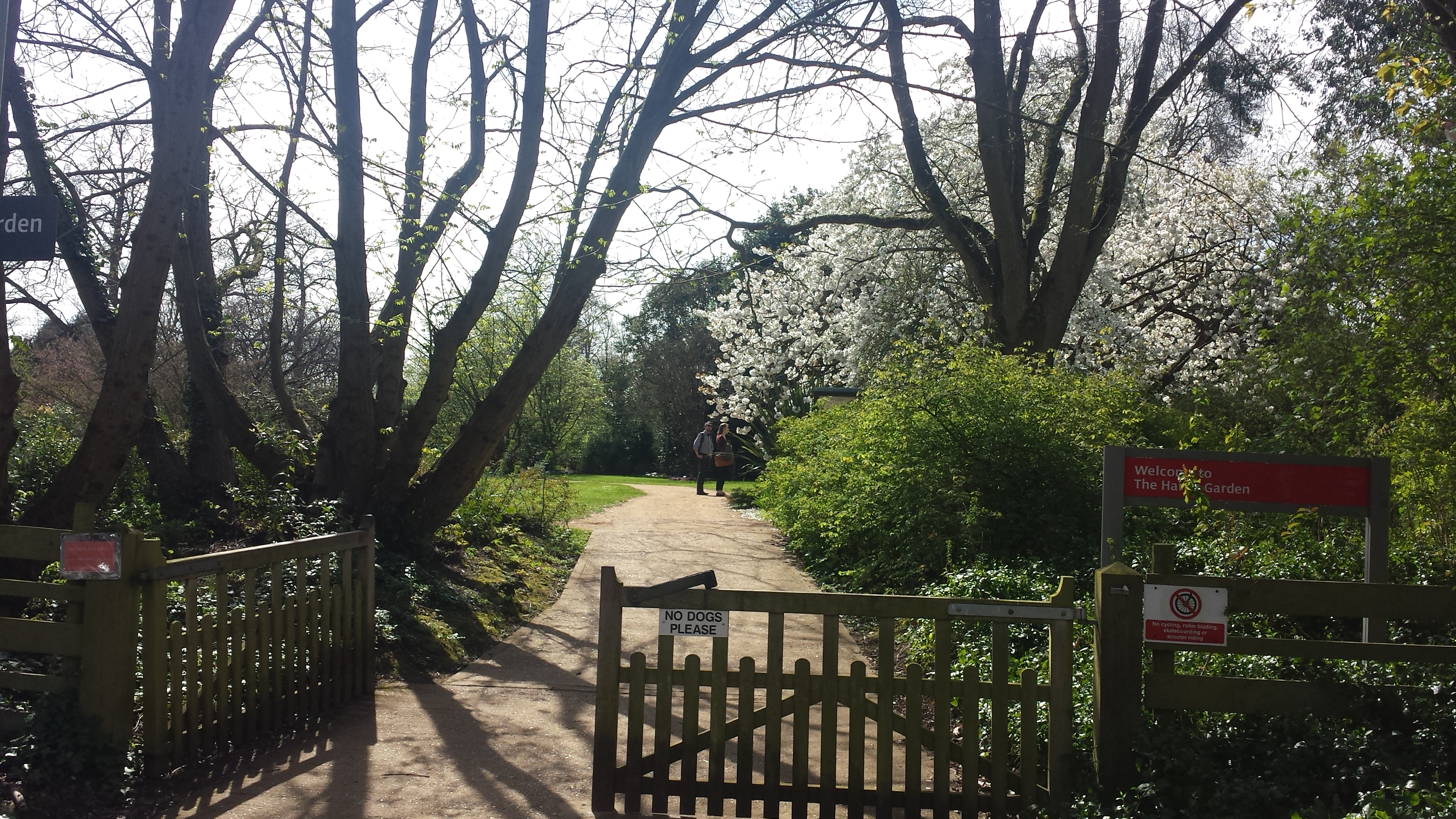
- The entrance to the Harris Garden
- Interactive map of Harris Garden
- Location: University of Reading; Whiteknights Campus; Reading; United Kingdom
- Coordinates: 51.43591°N 0.94113°W
- Area: 12 acres (4.9 ha)
- Owner: University of Reading
- Website: friendsoftheharrisgarden.org.uk

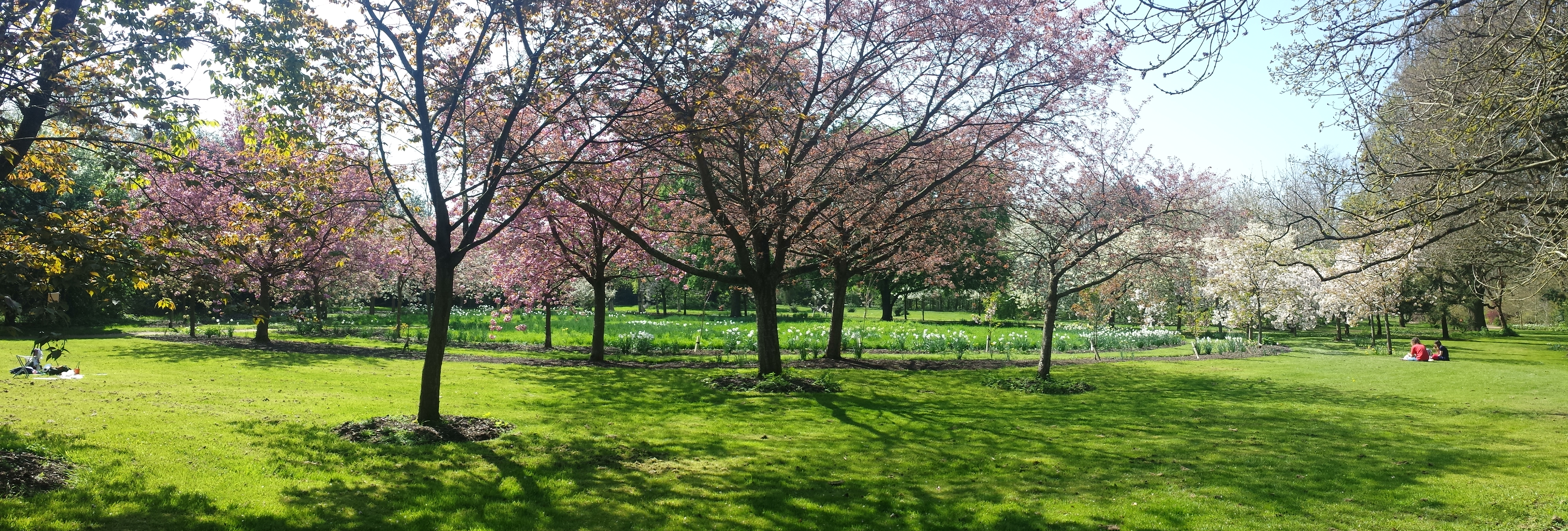
Cherry circle in April.

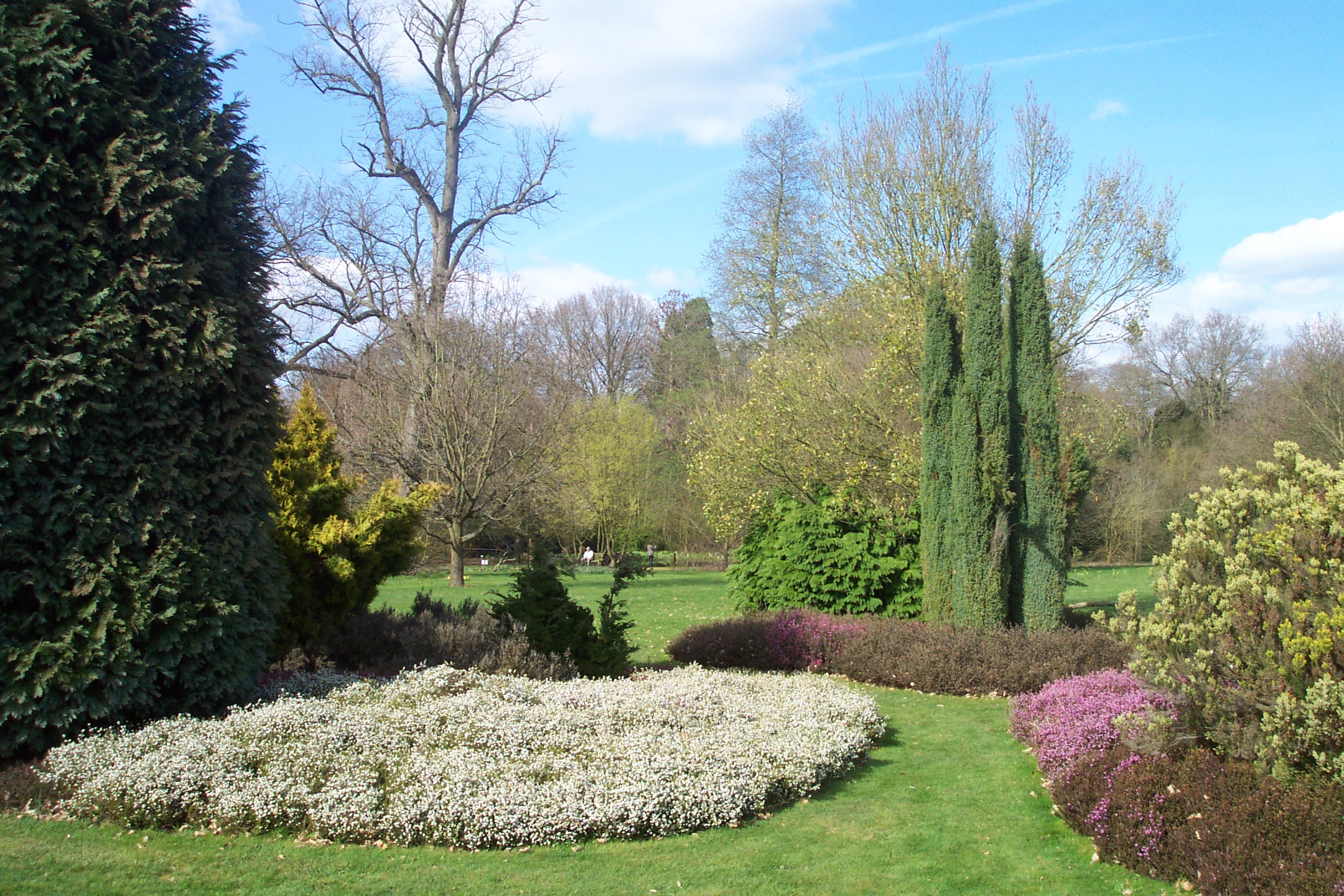
Heather garden in April.

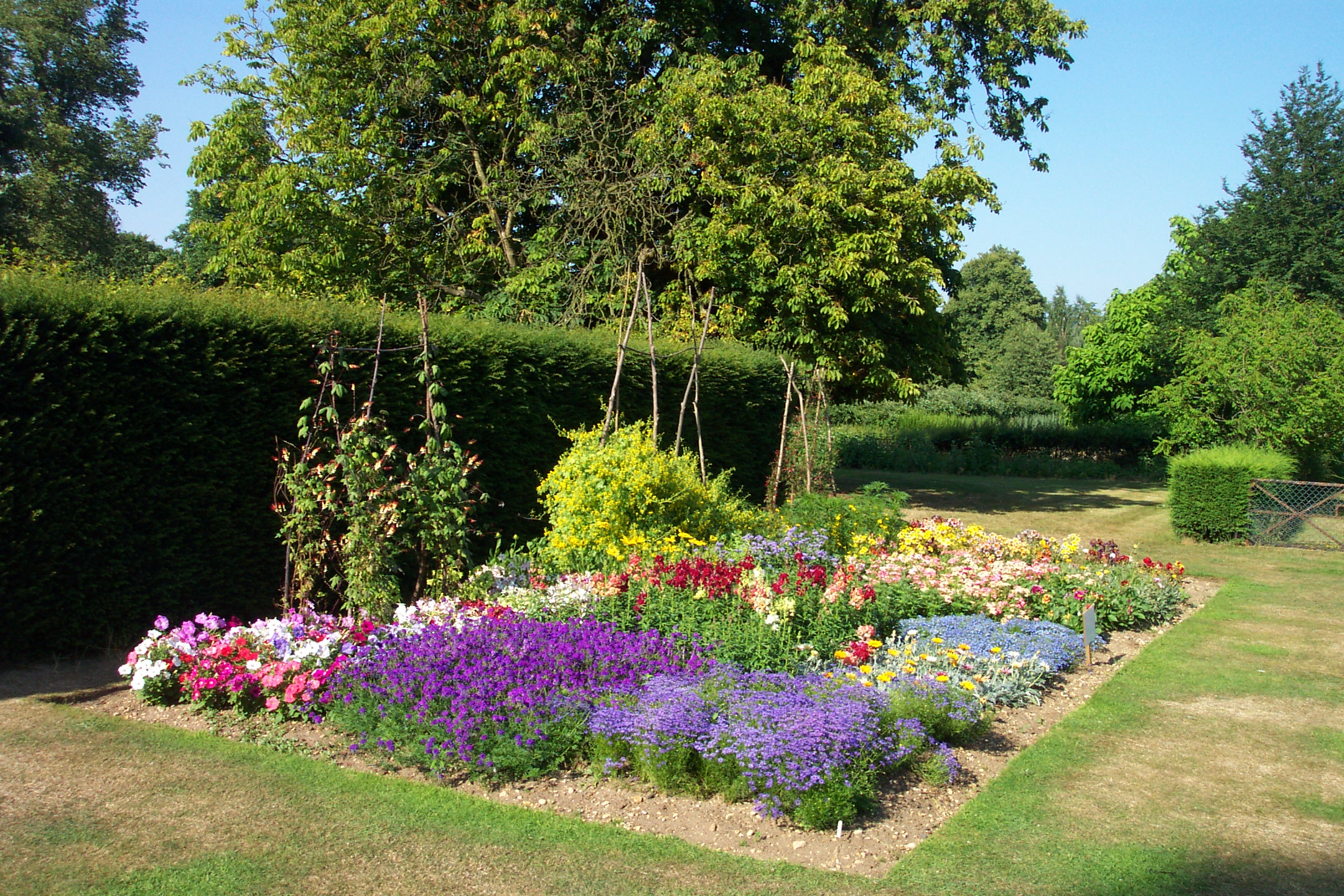
Flower bed in June.

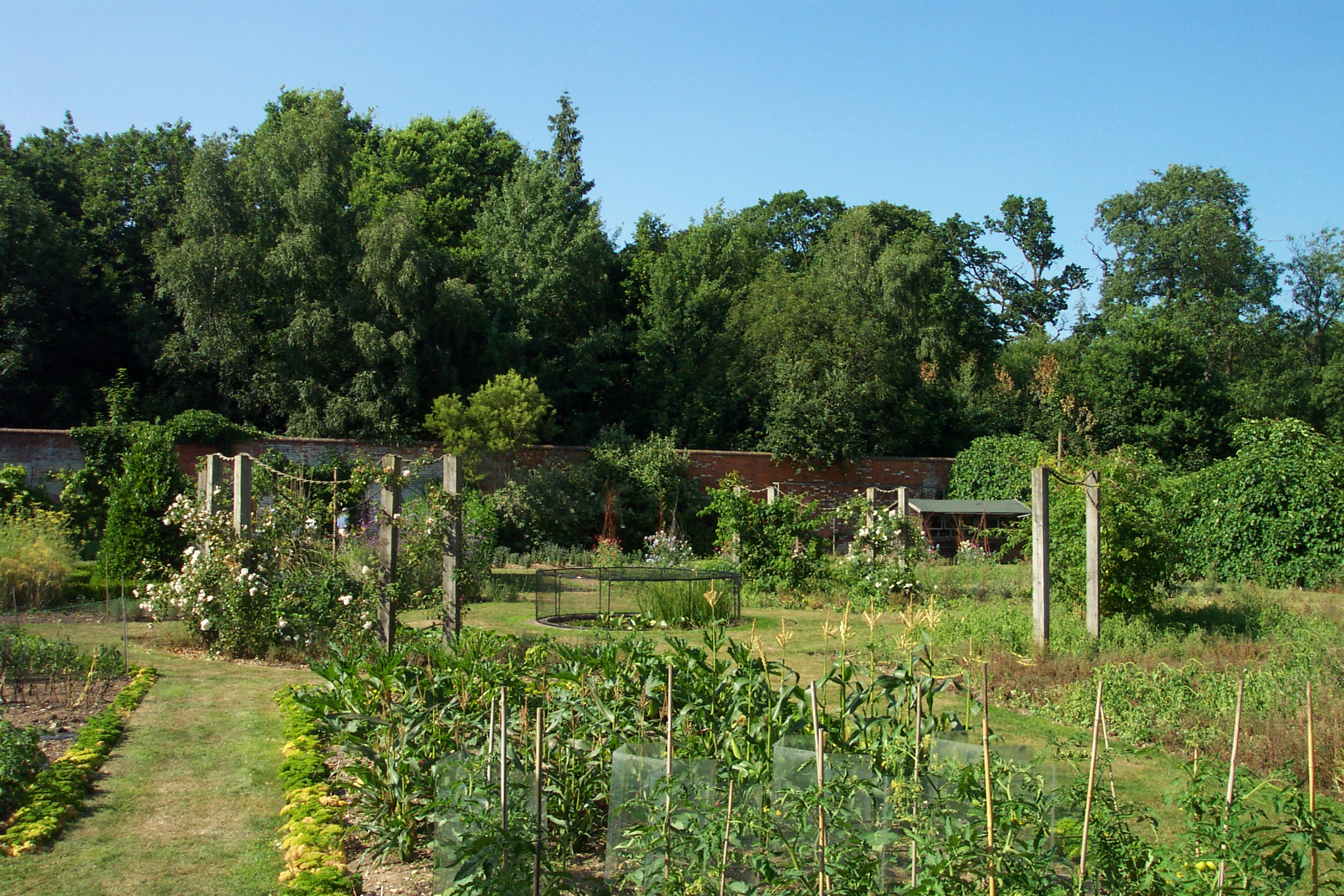
Walled Garden in June.

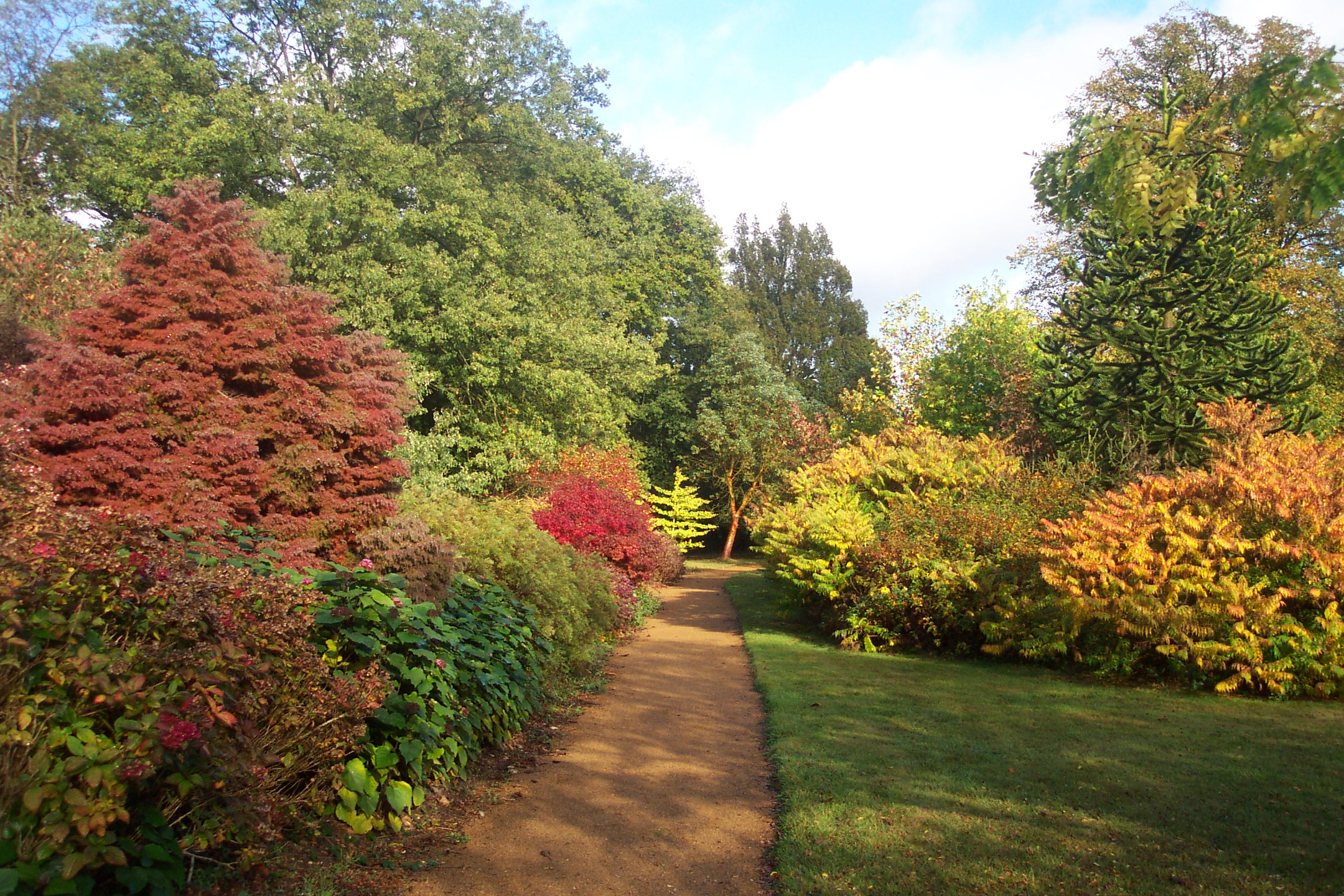
Autumn Bank in October.

The Harris Garden is a botanical garden of the University of Reading, situated about 2 miles (3.2 km) from the centre of the English town of Reading. It was established in 1972 and expanded into its current form in 1988. It is named after Professor Tom Harris, a distinguished palaeobotanist and keen gardener. Friends of the Harris Garden is an organisation set up with the aim of supporting the garden.

The garden is situated on the Whiteknights Park campus of the university, but is separate from the rest of the parkland campus. It is accessed from the rest of the campus by an entrance behind the Harborne and Philip Lyle Buildings of the School of Biological Sciences.

== Planting ==
The garden is about 12 acres (4.9 ha) in size. Within this area it encompasses various borders, several ponds and a stream, a formal garden, a heather garden, a wildflower meadow, coppiced woodland, and a walled garden. Adjoining the gardens to the north are the university's experimental grounds and several ranges of glasshouses.

The garden is a hotspot for butterflies and also features primulas, pansies and palm trees, as well as being home to a collection of Digitalis. Special collections include Amaryllidaceae, Apiaceae, Asclepiadoideae, Asteraceae, Crassulaceae, Droseraceae, Fabaceae, Fagaceae, Iridaceae, Geraniaceae, Lamiaceae, Lentibulariaceae, Liliaceae, Palmae, Pinaceae, Scrophulariaceae, Nepenthaceae, and Sarraceniaceae.

== History ==
The garden is in a location that was originally the home paddock of "The Wilderness", a former Victorian house built within the landscape garden created between 1798 and 1819 by George, Marquis of Blandford, later the 5th Duke of Marlborough.

A botanic garden was established by the university in 1972 when the Department of Botany moved from the university's London Road site in central Reading to the new Whiteknights campus. In 1987, the garden was redesigned by Richard Bisgrove of the Centre for Horticulture and Landscape in Biological Sciences. The following year, redevelopment of the Botanic Garden was started.

Responsibility for maintenance of the Harris Garden was transferred from the School of Biological Sciences to the Facilities Management Directorate's Grounds Team in October 2010. The demonstration garden, which was formerly situated in the centre of the site and used for undergraduate teaching, was at the same time replaced by an extension of the existing wildflower meadow.

== Usage and access ==
The garden was originally mostly used for teaching and research by the university's School of Biological Sciences, and the school will continue to use the garden for some teaching and practical work, but most academic activity will now be focussed on the walled garden. Since 2010 the garden has undergone significant development work and is now, with the exception of the walled garden, open to all with recreation and conservation being its primary function.

The garden also holds occasional open days, in which the gardens are open to the public from 2pm until 5.30pm, raising funds for various causes. In 2017, the garden is open at least once each month from April until September, generally on the second Sunday of the month. On these open days the walled garden and the adjoining experimental grounds, which are not normally publicly accessible, are sometimes also opened to visitors.

== Cultural references ==
The garden was the subject of an exhibition, entitled An Artist's Year in the Harris Garden and held at the Museum of English Rural Life in 2013, which was the result of artist Jenny Halstead's residency in the garden. The exhibition, composed of paintings and sketchbook studies, takes the visitor through the seasons, moods and development of the garden over the duration of a year from October 2011. A book, with the same title and published by Two Rivers Press, was a further product of the residency.

== See also ==
- List of parks and open spaces in Reading, Berkshire
