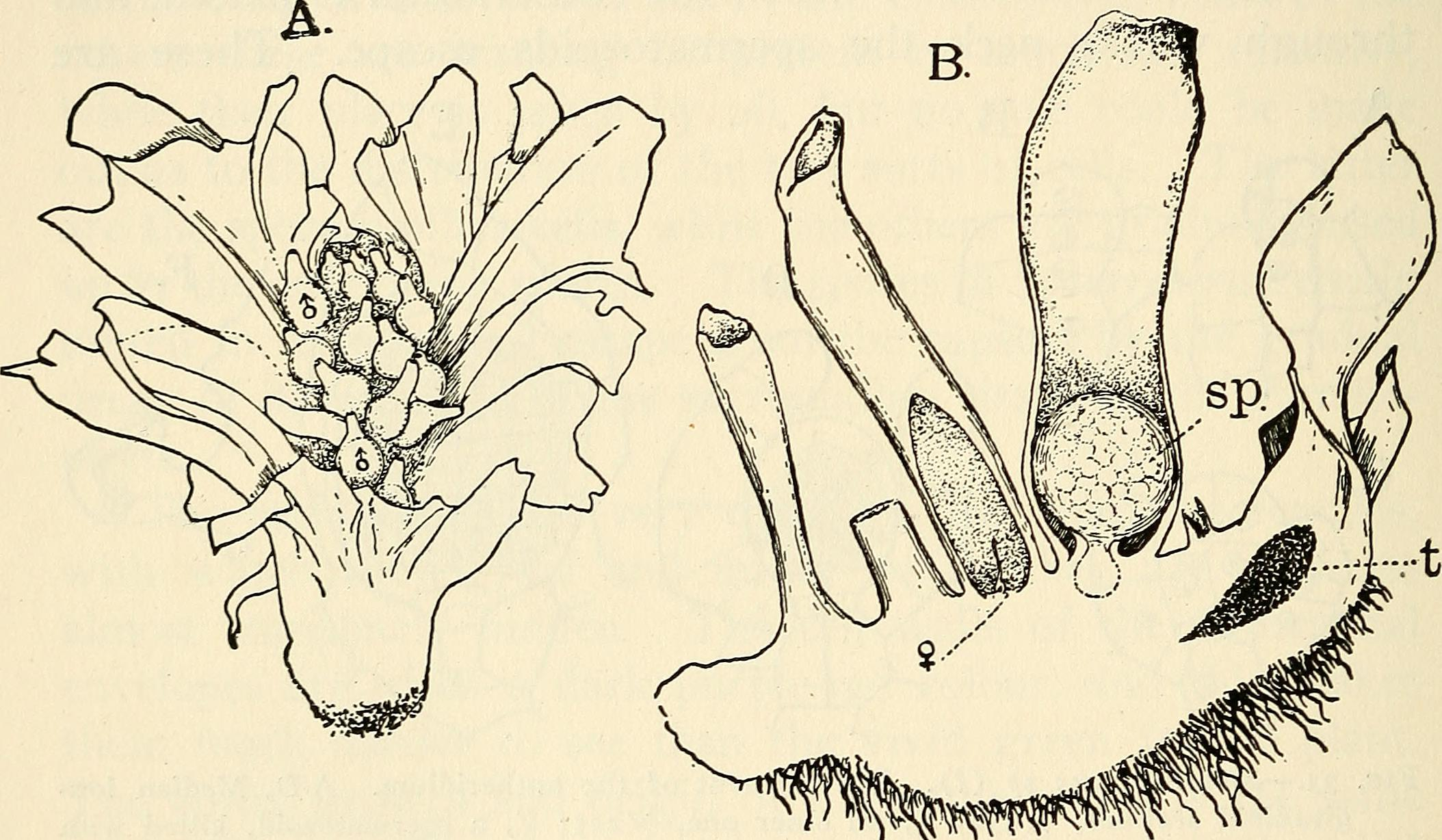

Conservation status
- Critically Endangered (IUCN 3.1)

- Critically Imperiled (NatureServe)

Scientific classification
- Kingdom: Plantae
- Clade: Embryophytes
- Division: Marchantiophyta
- Class: Marchantiopsida
- Order: Sphaerocarpales
- Family: Sphaerocarpaceae
- Genus: Geothallus; Campb.
- Species: G. tuberosus

Binomial name
- Geothallus tuberosus Campb.

Synonyms
- Geocarpus tuberosus (Campb.) K.I.Goebel; Sphaerocarpos tuberosus (Campb.) R.M.Schust.

= Geothallus =

Monotypic genus of liverwort endemic to California

Geothallus is a monotypic genus of liverwort in the family Sphaerocarpaceae. Its sole species, Geothallus tuberosus, is a critically endangered species endemic to California in the United States. Described in 1896 by American botanist Douglas Houghton Campbell, it is commonly known as Campbell's liverwort.

== Taxonomy and history ==
Geothallus tuberosus was described by American botanist Douglas Houghton Campbell in a 1896 article published in the Botanical Gazette. Campbell first noticed the new species in March 1895, having found an unfamiliar plant growing in a clump of Ophioglossum nudicaule he was cultivating. The O. nudicaule had been sent to him by a Katherine Brandegee, who collected them from sandy soil near San Diego, California. Mixed in with the O. nudicaule, the specimens were partially buried in the dirt and had lost much of their green colour due to desiccation. Campbell would only notice their uniqueness after rehydrating the clump of plants under a bell jar. The generic epithet Geothallus, meaning "earth thallus", refers to the way in which the plant grows affixed to the soil.

== Distribution and habitat ==
Endemic to California in the United States, Geothallus tuberosus is known only from San Diego County and Riverside County. It can be found in small, isolated populations on mesas, coastal hills, and the Peninsular Ranges, where it grows in sandy or gravelly soil, at the edges of vernal pools, and on flat and gently sloping areas in and near chaparral. It requires semi-shaded, moist conditions, and is considered very rare within its range.
