= University Textbook of Botany =

Academic textbook on botany

University Textbook of Botany was a widely used botany textbook published in 1902 and mostly written and illustrated by Douglas Houghton Campbell.
