= William Henry Lang =

British botanist

- Born: 12 May 1874; Withyham, Sussex
- Died: 29 August 1960 (aged 86); Great Missenden, Buckinghamshire, England
- Education: University of Glasgow
- Known for: research into the nature of Psilophyton and discovery of sporangium on the prothallus of ferns
- Awards: Royal Medal (1931); Linnean Medal (1956); Fellow of the Royal Society
- Scientific career
- Fields: Botany
- Workplaces: University of Manchester; University of Glasgow

William Henry Lang FRS FRSE FLS (12 May 1874–29 August 1960) was a British botanist and specialist in paleobotany who served as Barker professor of cryptogamic botany at the University of Manchester.

== Life ==
The son of Thomas Bilsland Lang, a medical practitioner, and his wife Emily Smith, he was born in Groombridge in Sussex on 12 May 1874.

Lang was educated at Dennistoun Public School in Glasgow before being accepted into the University of Glasgow, where he graduated with a BSc (Hons) in botany and zoology in 1894. He qualified for medicine in 1895 but never became a practising doctor; thanks to his own enthusiasm and the encouragement of his teacher Frederick Orpen Bower he instead became a professional botanist. His first research was on the structure of ferns, something Bower was apparently an authority on, and Lang soon followed him in that regard. He moved to study at the Jodrell Laboratory on a Robert Donaldson scholarship in 1895, where he focused on the apomixis of ferns, and discovered a sporangium on the prothallus of a fern at a time when biologists were exploring alternate means of reproduction in plants.

In 1899 he travelled to Sri Lanka and Malaya to study tropical cryptogams and collect samples, returning to Britain in 1902, when he became a lecturer at the University of Glasgow; while there he worked closely with D. T. Gwynne-Vaughan and Bower, with the three of them being known as the "triumvirate". After Gwynne-Vaughan's death in 1915 he studied preserved plant remnants in Aberdeen, making great insights into the nature of Psilophyton, which until then had been neglected. In 1900 he was awarded a Doctor of Science degree by the University of Glasgow, and when the Barker chair of cryptogamic botany was created at the University of Manchester Lang was the first choice. He took up his duties in 1909 and was elected to membership of the Manchester Literary and Philosophical Society on 2 November 1909, later serving as Secretary (1924–7).

In 1911 he was made a Fellow of the Royal Society and was awarded a Royal Medal in 1931 for 'his work on the anatomy and morphology of the fern-like fossils of the Old Red Sandstone.' In 1926 he was elected a Fellow of the Royal Society of Edinburgh. His proposers were Frederick Orpen Bower, Sir John Graham Kerr, Diarmid Noel Paton and George Alexander Gibson. He won the Society's Neill Prize for the period 1915-1917.

In 1932 he received an honorary doctorate (LLD) from the University of Glasgow, followed by a second honorary doctorate from Manchester University in 1942. He was also a foreign member of the Royal Swedish Academy of Sciences. Lang was noted for his encouragement of women's education and influenced the botanists Irene Manton, Marjorie Lindsey, and Grace Wigglesworth.

After his retirement he moved to Westmorland. His wife died in 1959 following a period of ill-health, and he followed barely a year later at his home in Milnthorpe on 29 August 1960.

== Family ==
He married his cousin, Elsa Valentine, in 1910. They had no children.

== Publications ==
- A Textbook of Botany (1912)
- Makers of British Botany: William Griffith (1810-1845) (1913)
- Palaeobotany (1926) co-written with Robert Kidston

== Botanical References ==
Professional and academic associations
Preceded by Tom Hatherley Pear	Secretary of the Manchester Literary and Philosophical Society; 1924–27	Succeeded by Edward Arthur Milne
