= Angiopteris microura =

Scientific classification
- Kingdom: Plantae
- Clade: Tracheophytes
- Division: Polypodiophyta
- Class: Polypodiopsida
- Order: Marattiales
- Family: Marattiaceae
- Genus: Angiopteris
- Species: A. microura

Binomial name
- Angiopteris microura Copel.

Species of fern

Angiopteris microura is a fern in the family Marattiaceae, native to the Solomon Islands. It is distinguished from other Angiopteris species primarily by its very large stipes or petioles which are up to 2.7 m (8 ft 10 in) long and up to 7 cm (2.8 in) thick.
