= Naiadita =

Scientific classification
- Kingdom: Plantae
- Division: Marchantiophyta
- Class: Marchantiopsida
- Subclass: Marchantiidae
- Order: †Naiaditales; R.M.Schust. ex T.Katag. & A.Hagborg,
- Family: †Naiaditaceae; R.M.Schust. ex T.Katag. & A.Hagborg,
- Genus: †Naiadita; P.B. Brodie
- Species: †N. lanceolata

Binomial name
- †Naiadita lanceolata P.B. Brodie

Species of liverwort

Naiadita is an extinct genus of liverwort in the class Marchantiopsida with one known species, Naiadita lanceolata, that lived in the Middle Triassic period, in what is now Germany. It was first described by Peter Bellinger Brodie in 1845.
