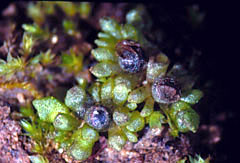
- Sphaerocarpos texanus Aust.

Scientific classification
- Kingdom: Plantae
- Division: Marchantiophyta
- Class: Marchantiopsida
- Order: Sphaerocarpales
- Family: Sphaerocarpaceae (Dumort.) Heeg

Genera
- Geothallus; Sphaerocarpos

= Sphaerocarpaceae =

Family of liverworts

Sphaerocarpaceae is a family of liverworts known as bottle liverworts. Approximately ten species are included in this family, most of them in the genus Sphaerocarpos, but one additional species in the genus Geothallus.

== Distribution ==
The majority of species in the family occur along the western edge of the Americas, from Washington to central Chile. However, the type species for Sphaerocarpos, S. michelii, is native to Europe. The weedy species Sphaerocarpos texanus is distributed widely in fields and gardens of North America, western Europe, and Mediterranean Africa. It may have been introduced with soil brought with crops or garden plants imported from the Americas.

== Classification ==
The group was recognized as a tribe by Barthélemy Dumortier in 1874 and elevated to family rank in 1891 by Moritz Heeg, under the name "Sphaerocarpeae". Two extant genera are recognized, with a single species in Geothallus and the remaining species assigned to Sphaerocarpos

=== Species ===
- Geothallus tuberosus
- Sphaerocarpos cristatus
- Sphaerocarpos donnellii
- Sphaerocarpos drewiae
- Sphaerocarpos hians
- Sphaerocarpos michelii
- Sphaerocarpos stipitatus
- Sphaerocarpos texanus
