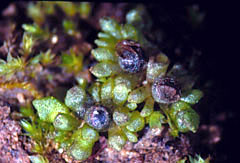
- Sphaerocarpales

Scientific classification
- Kingdom: Plantae
- Division: Marchantiophyta
- Class: Marchantiopsida
- Subclass: Marchantiidae
- Order: Sphaerocarpales; Cavers, (1910)

Families
- Monocarpaceae; Riellaceae; Sphaerocarpaceae †Naiaditaceae

= Sphaerocarpales =

Order of liverworts

Sphaerocarpales is an order of plants within the liverworts. Approximately twenty species are in this order which is sub-divided into four families: Monocarpaceae, Sphaerocarpaceae and Riellaceae, as well as the extinct family Naiaditaceae. The inclusion of the Naiaditaceae is uncertain, and the family has sometimes been assigned to the Calobryales.

== Classification ==
Living taxa and species count based on Söderström et al. 2016 and synonyms from Collection of genus-group names in a systematic arrangement.

- Monocarpaceae D.J.Carr ex Schelpe 1969
  - Monocarpus D.J.Carr 1956 non Post & Kuntze 1903 [Carrpos Proskauer 1961]
- Riellaceae Engl. 1892
  - Austroriella Cargill & J.Milne2013
  - Riella Mont. 1852 [Duriaea Bory De St. Vincent & Montagne 1843 non Durieua Merat 1829; Maisonneuvea Trevisan 1877; Duriella Bory de St. Vincent ex Billot 1861] (about 18 spp.)
- Sphaerocarpaceae Heeg 1891
  - Geothallus Campb. 1896 [Geocarpus Goebel 1915 non Kinkelin 1884] (1 species)
  - Sphaerocarpos Boehm. 1760 non Gmelin 1791 [Sphaerocarpus (sic) Adanson 1763] (8 or 9 spp.)
- †Naiaditaceae Schuster 1980 nominum invalidum
  - †Naiadita lanceolata Brodie 1845
