= Douglas Houghton Campbell =

American botanist (1859–1953)

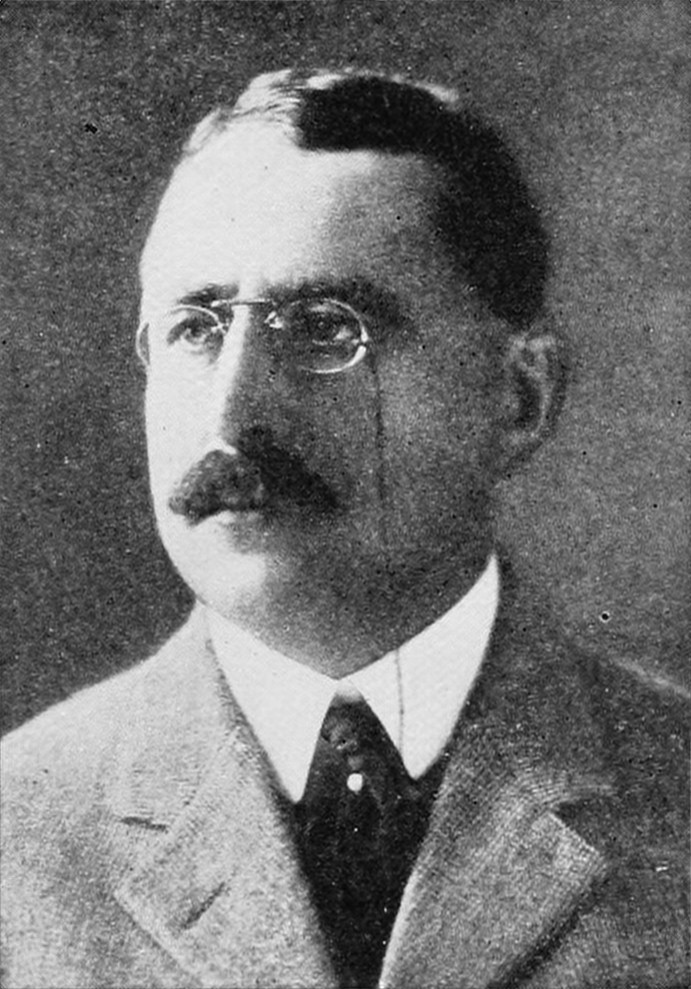
- Born: December 19, 1859; Detroit, Michigan
- Died: February 24, 1953 (aged 92); Stanford, California
- Education: University of Michigan
- Scientific career
- Fields: Botany
- Author abbrev. (botany): Campb.

Douglas Houghton Campbell (December 19, 1859 – February 24, 1953) was an American botanist and university professor. He was one of the 15 founding professors at Stanford University. His death was described as "the end of an era of a group of great plant morphologists."

Campbell was born and raised in Detroit, Michigan. His father, James V. Campbell, was a member of the Supreme Court of the state of Michigan and a law professor at the University of Michigan. Douglas Campbell graduated from Detroit High School in 1878, going on to study at the University of Michigan. He studied botany, learning new microscopy techniques, and becoming interested in cryptogrammic (deciduous) ferns. He received his master's degree in 1882, and taught botany at Detroit High School while he completed his PhD research. He received his PhD in 1886, then travelled to Germany to learn more microscopy techniques. He developed a technique to embed plant material in paraffin to make fine cross-sections; he was one of the first if not the first to study plant specimens using this technique, which had been newly developed by zoologists. He was also a pioneer in the study of microscopic specimens using vital stains.

When Campbell returned to the United States he took up a professorship at Indiana University (1888 to 1891), writing the textbook Elements of Structural and Systematic Botany. In 1891 he became the founding head of the botany department at Stanford University and remained at Stanford for the remainder of his career, retiring in 1925. He studied mosses and liverworts, producing The Structure and Development of Mosses and Ferns in 1895. This book, together with its subsequent editions in 1905 and 1918, became the authoritative work on the subject and "firmly established Campbell's reputation as one of the leading botanists of the United States." His Lectures on the Evolution of Plants was published in 1899, and became widely used as a botany textbook. University Textbook of Botany was published in 1902, with fears expressed by colleagues that interest in pure research interest would prejudice its worth being found to be misplaced. He also travelled extensively though the Pacific collecting samples and writing Outline of Plant Geography, published in 1926, about his travels.

Campbell was a member of a number of scientific institutions. He was president of the Botanical Society of America in 1913 and was elected to the National Academy of Sciences in 1910. He was a member of the Linnaean Society of London, the Royal Society of Edinburgh, the Deutsche Botanische Gesellschaft, the International Association of Botanists, and the American Philosophical Society.
