= Wenshania =

Wenshania Temporal range: Pragian

Scientific classification
- Kingdom: Plantae
- Clade: Tracheophytes
- Clade: Lycophytes
- Plesion: †Zosterophylls
- Genus: †Wenshania; W.Q.Zhu & Kenrick (1999)

Species
- W. zhichangensis W.Q.Zhu & Kenrick (1999)

Extinct genus of spore-bearing plants

Wenshania is a genus of extinct vascular plants found in the Posongchong Formation, Yunnan, China, which is of Early Devonian age (Pragian, around 413 to 411 million years ago). Plants consisted of leafless stems with simple dichotomous branching, and bore spore-forming organs or sporangia all around the sides of stems. Wenshania is part of the broadly defined group of zosterophylls.

== Description ==
The sporophyte of Wenshania zhichangensis, the type species of the genus, was described from compressed fossils preserved in siltstone. The basal part of the plant is not known, preventing a full reconstruction. The overall height is estimated to be greater than 10 cm, based on the length of the preserved parts. Stems (axes) were smooth and leafless, up to 3.1 mm in diameter, and branched dichotomously or pseudomonopodially (i.e. one branch formed more of a 'main' stem than the other). Specimens show up to three orders of branching. The internal anatomy of the stems is unknown. Spore-forming organs or sporangia were borne laterally on at least the last two orders of branches, possibly more. Sporangia were flattened, more-or-less circular to kidney-shaped (reniform) in face view, and upright on stalks about 2.5 mm long. They were relatively large, typically up to about 4 mm high and 4 mm wide, although a few were significantly larger. To release its spores, a sporangium split into two 'valves' along a thickened margin at the top. Spores have not been observed.

Associated with stems bearing sporangia were other stems with branches at wide angles, some with short side branches. They are thought to represent a system of basal rhizomes, but direct connections to the aerial stems were not observed. The gametophyte is unknown.

== Taxonomy ==
The genus Wenshania was created by Zhu and Kenrick in 1998 with a single species, Wenshania zhichangensis. The fossil specimens were found in Zhichang village in the Wenshan district of southwestern China. The genus name is derived from the district, the specific epithet from the village. Although similar in some characteristics to the genus Zosterophyllum Penhallow (1892), that genus was described as having its sporangia in a "loose spike", whereas the specimens concerned have their sporangia distributed over more than one order of branching rather than in a terminal spike. Hence the authors considered that a new genus was required.

== Phylogeny ==
Wenshania is clearly related to the broadly defined group of zosterophylls, as it had flattened, oval to reniform sporangia which were attached to the sides of stems on short stalks and which released spores by splitting into two valves along a thickened border. The genus was described later than the publication of the cladistic studies by Kenrick and Crane which have been the foundation for much of the phylogeny of early land plants. It falls outside the core clade of zosterophylls (Zosterophyllopsida sensu Kenrick & Crane), whose members have sporangia arranged in two rows and new growths with coiled tips. The authors of the genus say that Wenshania most closely resembles Gumuia found in the same stratum, whose current phylogenetic placement in a paraphyletic group basal to the core zosterophylls can be seen in the summary cladogram shown below.

- lycophytes
  - † Hicklingia
  - - †basal groups
      Adoketophyton, Discalis, Distichophytum (=Rebuchia), Gumuia, Huia, Zosterophyllum myretonianum, Z. llanoveranum, Z. fertile
    - †'core' zosterophylls
      Zosterophyllum divaricatum, Tarella, Oricilla, Gosslingia, Hsua, Thrinkophyton, Protobarinophyton, Barinophyton obscurum, B. citrulliforme, Sawdonia, Deheubarthia, Konioria, Anisophyton, Serrulacaulis, Crenaticaulis
    - - †basal groups
        Nothia, Zosterophyllum deciduum
      - lycopsids
        extant and extinct members

Hao and Xue in 2013 listed the genus as a zosterophyll.
