= Barinophyte =

Scientific classification
- Kingdom: Plantae
- Clade: Tracheophytes
- Clade: †Barinophytes

Genera
- See text.

Extinct clade of vascular plants

The barinophytes are a group of extinct vascular plants (tracheophytes). Their relationship with other vascular plants is unclear. They have been treated as the separate class Barinophytopsida, the order Barinophytales of uncertain class and as a family or clade Barinophytaceae within the zosterophylls. They have also been considered to be possible lycopodiopsids.

== Description ==
Barinophyton is the type genus of the group; Protobarinophyton is similar. They were vascular plants with an exarch protostele. Plants consisted of alternatively arranged branches, apparently without leaves or enations, with their sporangia arranged in two rows on one-sided spike-like structures that developed on side shoots. Each sporangium was born on a curved bract-like appendage (a "sporangiferous appendage") and contained several thousand microspores, about 30–40 μm in diameter and about 30 megaspores, 410–560 μm in diameter, so that the plants were heterosporous. A similar pattern of spore sizes and numbers has been found in the progymnosperm Archaeopteris.

Dibracophyton has been tentatively assigned to this group. It does have some outgrowths on the lower parts of the stems (axes), which raises the possibility that more fossil material might show that other barinophytes did not have naked stems.

== Taxonomy ==
=== Phylogeny ===
Two very different cladograms have been produced showing the evolutionary relationships of taxa assigned to the barinophytes. Kenrick and Crane in 1997 placed two species of Barinophyton and the genus Protobarinophyton in the Barinophytaceae in their Sawdoniales, well nested within the zosterophylls. A summary cladogram produced by Crane et al. in 2004, shows Barinophyton and Protobarinophyton as 'core' zosterophylls.

- lycophytes
  - † Hicklingia
  - - †basal groups
      Adoketophyton, Discalis, Distichophytum (=Rebuchia), Gumuia, Huia, Zosterophyllum myretonianum, Z. llanoveranum, Z. fertile
    - †'core' zosterophylls
      Zosterophyllum divaricatum, Tarella, Oricilla, Gosslingia, Hsua, Thrinkophyton, Protobarinophyton, Barinophyton obscurum, B. citrulliforme, Sawdonia, Deheubarthia, Konioria, Anisophyton, Serrulacaulis, Crenaticaulis
    - - †basal groups
        Nothia, Zosterophyllum deciduum
      - lycopsids
        extant and extinct members

Taylor et al. in 2009 did not present a cladogram, but considered the barinophytes to be possible lycopsids rather than zosterophylls. By contrast, Hao and Xue in 2013 do not even place Dibracophyton, which they consider to be a possible barinophyte, within the lycopodiopsids, instead putting it between this group and the euphyllophytes.

- - Lycopodiopsida
  - - Yunia
    - - Dibracophyton (possible barinophyte)
      - euphyllophytes

=== Genera ===
Genera that are placed, or tentatively placed, in the barinophytes (with the group treated at different ranks) include:

- Barinophyton
- Bracteophyton
- Dibracophyton
- Krithodeophyton
- Protobarinophyton

== Bibliography ==
- Hao, Shougang & Xue, Jinzhuang (2013), The early Devonian Posongchong flora of Yunnan: a contribution to an understanding of the evolution and early diversification of vascular plants, Beijing: Science Press, ISBN 978-7-03-036616-0
