= Posongchong Formation =

Geologic formation in China

- Stratigraphic range: Pragian
- Type: Geological formation
- Underlies: Pojiao Formation
- Overlies: Meitan Formation

Location
- Region: Yunnan
- Country: China

The Posongchong Formation is an early Devonian formation from China. It preserves a wide range of plant and fish fossils, many being only known from this formation.

== Paleobiota ==
=== Plants ===
Color key: Taxon / Reclassified taxon / Taxon falsely reported as present / Dubious taxon or junior synonym / Ichnotaxon / Ootaxon / Morphotaxon

Notes
Uncertain or tentative taxa are in small text
~~crossed out~~ taxa are discredited.

Plants
Genus	Species	Higher taxon	Notes	Images
Adoketophyton	A. subverticillatum, A. parvulum, A. pingyipuensis	Lycophyta?	Formerly placed within Zosterophyllum	Reconstruction of Adoketophyton
Amplectosporangium	A. jiangyouense, A. unilaterale, A. unilaterale forma minor	incertae sedis	A. unilaterale was formerly placed within Oricilla	
Baragwanathia	B. sp.	Drepanophycales	Only known from leafy stems, cannot be placed in a species	B. longifolia fossil
Catenalis	C. digitata	Tracheophyta incertae sedis	Intermediate between algae and vascular plants	
Celatheca	C. beckii	Lyginopteridales?	One of the earliest known seed plants	
Cervicornus	C. wenshanensis	Sphenopsida?	Sporangia unknown, may be synonymous with Estinnophyton	
Demersatheca	D. contigua	Zosterophylls	Only known from fertile axes	
Dibracophyton	D. acrovatum	Barinophytopsida incertae sedis	Relatively unusual with dichotomous branching "leaves"	
Discalis	D. longistipa	Zosterophyllales	Bears spines on its main axes, somewhat resembles Sawdonia	
Distichophytum	D. sp.	Zosterophyllales	Only known from a fragmentary specimen	D. ovatum reconstruction
Estinnophyton	E. yunnanense	Sphenopsida?	Possibly a stem-sphenopsid	
Eophyllophyton	E. bellum	Eophyllophytopsida (Euphyllophytes)	Oldest plant with megaphyllous leaves	Eophyllophyton fossil
Guangnania	G. cuneata	Zosterophyllopsida?	Unclear whether it truly is a zosterophyll, somewhat similar to Yunia	
Gumuia	G. zyzzata	Zosterophyllales	One of the most well-known Posongchong plants	
Halleophyton	H. zhichangense	Drepanophycales	Another possible species also known from the formation	
Hedeia	H. sinica	Progymnospermopsida?	Resembles both seed plants and trimerophytes	
Hicklingia	cf. Hicklingia sp.	Zosterophyllales	Resembles the type species of the genus, but bears a few differences from it	
Hueberia	H. zhichangensis	Drepanophycales?	Also resembles Leclercqia, however lack of anatomy means its position is unclear.	
Huia	H. recurvata	Rhyniopsida?	Likely related to Renalia	
Ornicephalum	O. sichuanense	Zosterophyllopsida	Formerly classed within Zosterophyllum	
Pauthecophyton	P. gracile	Trimerophyta	Related to Psilophyton	
Polythecophyton	P. demissum	Progymnospermopsida?	Likely related to Hedeia and Aneurophytales	
Psilophyton	P. primitivum	Trimerophyta	One of the most widespread basal vascular plants	P. crenulatum fossil
Ramoferis	R. amalia	Zosterophyllales	Closely resembles Zosterophyllum	
Riccardiothallus	R. devonicus	Aneuraceae	Earliest simple thalloid liverwort known	
Stachyophyton	S. yunnanense	Tracheophyta incertae sedis	Divergent from other plants due to its leaf-like branches and other features	Stachyophyton fossil
Wenshania	W. zhichangensis	Zosterophyllales	Closely resembles Zosterophyllum	
Yunia	Y. dichotoma, Y. guangnania	Zosterophyllopsida?	Possibly closer to euphyllophytes than zosterophylls?	Y. dichotoma reconstruction
Zhenglia	Z. radiata	Protolepidodendrales?	May preserve the earliest lycophyte ligulae	
Zosterophyllum	Z. australianum, Z. ramosum, Z. minifertillum, Z. tenerum	Zosterophyllales	Known from numerous other localities	Reconstruction of Zosterophyllum sp.

=== Animals ===
Animals
Genus	Species	Higher taxon	Material	Notes	Images
Arquatichthys	A. porosus	Dipnomorpha		Only known from scales and skull material	
Brevipetalichthys	B. gracilis	Petalichthyida			
Euporosteus	E. yunnanensis	Actinistia		Earliest known anatomically modern coelacanth	E. yunnanensis fossil
Gantarostrataspis	G. gengi	Gantarostrataspidae (Galeaspida)		Bears an unusual sensory system	
Gantarostrataspis	G. sp. indet.	Gantarostrataspidae (Galeaspida)	A partial rostral process.		
Gumuaspis	G. rostrata	Huananaspidae		Resembles Laxaspis	
Huananaspis	H. wudinensis	Huananaspidae		Also known from the Nagaoling Formation	
Lungmenshanaspis	L. yunnanensis	Huananaspidae (Galeaspida)		From a different locality to the "main" Posongchong Formation, yet correlates with it in age	Reconstruction of both Lungmenshanaspis species
Macrothyraspis	M. longicornis	Macrothyraspidae (Galeaspida)		Bears unusually long cornual and rostral processes	
Macrothyraspis	M. longilanceus	Macrothyraspidae (Galeaspida)	Complete rim of the ventral headshield.		
Osteolepiformes indet.	Unapplicable	Osteolepiformes		Cannot be placed within a genus	
Paleolophus	P. yunnanensis	Dipnoi		One of the earliest lungfish, shows rapid evolution of various skull characteristics	
Panjiangosteus	P. eurycephala	Antarctaspidae			
Petalichthyida	Indeterminate	Petalichthyida	An incomplete vental head shield wall.		
Qingmenaspis	Q. microculus	Galeaspida incertae sedis		Bears similar unornamented regions to osteostracan "lateral fields"	
Qingmenodus	Q. yui	Onychodontidae		The first onychodont to preserve the otoccipital region of the skull	Skull material (A-D) and life reconstruction (E)
Rhegmaspis	R. xiphoidea	Gantarostrataspidae (Galeaspida)		Likely quite active as shown by its streamlined head shield	Reconstruction of various galeaspids (Rhegmaspis at the top)
Sanqiaspis	S. rostrata	Sanqiaspididae (Galeaspida)		Species also known from Vietnam	
Sanqiaspis	S. zhaotongensis	Sanqiaspididae (Galeaspida)	Partial headshield.		
Sarcopterygii	Indeterminate	Sarcopterygii	Two scales.		
Tungsenia	T. paradoxa	Tetrapodomorpha		Most basal and earliest known tetrapodomorph	Tungsenia reconstruction
Wenshanaspis	W. zhichangensis	Zhaotongaspididae (Galeaspida)		Differentiated by its cornual processes	
Wenshanaspis	W. sp.	Zhaotongaspididae (Galeaspida)	An incomplete headshield		
Yangfanyu	Y. anachoresis	Euantiarcha (Antiarchi)			
Yiminaspis	Y. shenme	Wuttagoonaspidae		Suggests a Chinese origin of the family	Yiminaspis reconstruction
Yunnanolepidoidei	Indeterminate	Yunnanolepidoidei	An incomplete dorsal trunk shield wall.		
Zhaotongaspis	Z. janvieri	Zhaotongaspididae (Galeaspida)		Bears the highest quantity of branchial fossae known in agnathans	Zhaotongaspis restoration
