= Ramoferis =

Ramoferis Temporal range: Pragian

Scientific classification
- Kingdom: Plantae
- Clade: Tracheophytes
- Clade: Lycophytes
- Plesion: †Zosterophylls
- Genus: †Ramoferis; Hao & Xue (2011)

Species
- Ramoferis amalia Hao & Xue (2011); Ramoferis cf. amalia

Extinct genus of spore-bearing plants

Ramoferis is a genus of extinct vascular plants of the Pragian stage of the Early Devonian, around 413 to 411 million years ago. It is considered to be a zosterophyll, one of a group of plants that were related to the ancestors of the modern lycopsids. Fossils were found in the Posongchong Formation in Guangnan County, Yunnan, in southwestern China, where they occur as compressions.

== Description ==
The first species to be described was Ramoferis amalia. The plant branched isotomously (equally) many times, with branches forming angles of about 30–60°. Usually the axes (stems) were 3–4 mm across, although some were up to 5 mm across. The longest axis found bearing sporangia was about 12 cm long, branching four or five times, with the branching intervals decreasing towards the top. The smallest terminal branchlets were less than 1 mm wide and about 6-10 mm long. Sporangia were borne on short stalks both terminally and laterally. Some were found below the first branching point of the main axis, others were gathered into a spike. The sporangia were flattened, usually about 3–6 mm wide and 2.5–5 mm high. Viewed from the front, the sporangia were ovoid or pear-shaped, narrowing towards the stalk. They opened (dehisced) along a narrow rim at the edge opposite the stalk (the distal edge), producing two equal valves. Only poorly preserved spores were found, 48–77 μm in diameter. Nothing is known about the internal anatomy of the axes.

A second species, known only as Ramoferis cf. amalia, was described from fossils found in a slightly different location. Only limited material was found. Differences regarded as significant included the branching angle being greater, 60–70°; the more kidney (reniform) shaped sporangia; the longer sporangial stalks; and the less distinct spikes of sporangia.

== Taxonomy ==
Hao and Xue place Ramoferis in class Zosterophyllopsida, order Zosterophyllales. They use Zosterophyllales for species with both terminal and lateral sporangia; Gosslingiales have only lateral sporangia.

=== Phylogeny ===
An cladistic analysis by Hao and Xue in 2013 placed Ramoferis clearly within their Zosterophyllales clade:

- Zosterophyllopsida
  - Gosslingiales (paraphyletic)
  - - Zosterophyllales
      - Zosterophyllum ramosum
      - - Huia
        - - Zosterophyllum myretonianum
          - Ramoferis

== Bibliography ==
- Hao, Shougang & Xue, Jinzhuang (2013), The early Devonian Posongchong flora of Yunnan: a contribution to an understanding of the evolution and early diversification of vascular plants, Beijing: Science Press, ISBN 978-7-03-036616-0
