= Macivera =

Macivera Temporal range: Ludfordian

Scientific classification
- Kingdom: Plantae
- Clade: Tracheophytes
- Clade: Lycophytes
- Plesion: †Zosterophylls
- Genus: †Macivera; Kotyk et al. (2002)

Species
- M. gracilis Kotyk et al. (2002)

Extinct genus of spore-bearing plants

Reconstruction showing the form of the sporangial cluster of Macivera gracilis. Scale bar = 1 mm. Based on the description in Kotyk et al. (2002).

Macivera is a genus of extinct vascular plants. Fossils were found in sediments in Bathust Island, Nunavut, Canada, from the upper Silurian (Ludfordian, around 430 to 420 million years ago). The leafless stems (axes) branched dichotomously and were relatively thin, being between 0.7 and 1.0 mm wide. Spore-forming organs or sporangia, which were elliptical, being longer than wide, were borne on the end regions of stems. Macivera is considered to be a zosterophyll.

== Description ==
The genus was first described from a small number of specimens found in sediments in Bathurst Island, Nunavut, Canada, which are considered to be of Late Silurian age (Ludfordian, around 430 to 420 million years ago).

Stems (axes) were smooth, devoid of leaves, hairs or other protrusions, and were between 0.7 and 1.0 mm wide (around the lower limit of the size Boyce suggested as being compatible with the presence of vascular tissue), tapering down to 0.1 mm towards the apex of those stems which did not bear sporangia. The stems branched equally and dichotomously, with some suggestion of downwards branching at the base. The overall height of the plant is estimated to be some 8 cm.

Spore-forming organs or sporangia were borne towards the end of stems, apparently in clusters, angled slightly away from the upright. They were either borne directly on the stem or had short stalks, and do not appear to have been arranged into distinct rows. Sporangia were elliptical in shape, 1.3 to 2.0 mm high and 1.1 to 1.3 mm wide, so that they were longer than wide. As is typical of zosterophylls, they split to release their spores via a linear opening at the opposite end to their attachment to the stem. Spores were found, around 50 μm in diameter, but may have been immature; they were of one size range (i.e. the plant was homosporous).

== Taxonomy ==
The genus and species Macivera gracilis were named in 2002. The genus name is in memory of Elisabeth E. McIver, a paleobotanist and collector of plant fossils from Bathurst Island. The specific epithet refers to the thinness of the stems.

== Phylogeny ==
The position of the sporangia on the sides of stems and the way in which they split to release spores suggests a relationship with the zosterophylls. The distinctive features of Macivera are its small size, and the nature of its sporangia which are elongated rather than wider than high or kidney-shaped, and which have short or no stalks while not being borne in clear rows. The closest comparison was considered by Kotyk et al. to be with the genus Distichophytum, but this has its sporangia in two more-or-less opposite rows. Hicklingia edwardii has similarly shaped and arranged sporangia, but they are considerably larger and stalked. Hao and Xue in 2013 listed the genus as a zosterophyll.
