= Gosslingia =

Gosslingia Temporal range: Early Devonian

Scientific classification
- Kingdom: Plantae
- Clade: Tracheophytes
- Clade: Lycophytes
- Plesion: †Zosterophylls
- Order: †incertae sedis
- Family: †Gosslingiaceae
- Genus: †Gosslingia

Extinct genus of spore-bearing plants

Gosslingia was a genus of Early Devonian land plant with branching axes. Fossils have been from the Lochkovian to the Pragian, 420 to 411 million years ago.

A cladogram published in 2004 by Crane et al. places Gosslingia in the core of a paraphyletic stem group of broadly defined "zosterophylls", basal to the lycopsids (living and extinct clubmosses and relatives).

- lycophytes
  - † Hicklingia
  - - †basal groups
      Adoketophyton, Discalis, Distichophytum (=Rebuchia), Gumuia, Huia, Zosterophyllum myretonianum, Z. llanoveranum, Z. fertile
    - †'core' zosterophylls
      Zosterophyllum divaricatum, Tarella, Oricilla, Gosslingia, Hsua, Thrinkophyton, Protobarinophyton, Barinophyton obscurum, B. citrulliforme, Sawdonia, Deheubarthia, Konioria, Anisophyton, Serrulacaulis, Crenaticaulis
    - - †basal groups
        Nothia, Zosterophyllum deciduum
      - lycopsids
        extant and extinct members

Hao and Xue in 2013 used the absence of terminal sporangia to place the genus in the family Gosslingiaceae in the paraphyletic order Gosslingiales, a group considered to have indeterminate growth, with fertile branches generally showing circinate vernation (initially curled up). Kenrick and Crane in 1997 also placed the genus in the family Gosslingiaceae, but they place this family in the order Sawdoniales.
