= Bathurstia =

Bathurstia Temporal range: Pragian

Scientific classification
- Kingdom: Plantae
- Clade: Tracheophytes
- Clade: Lycophytes
- Plesion: †Zosterophylls
- Genus: †Bathurstia

Extinct genus of spore-bearing plants

Bathurstia was a genus of scrambling Silu-Devonian land plant with isotomously branching axes that grew to heights of 30 cm. It is aligned with the Zosterophylls, and produced Calamospora-type spores.
