= Bracteophyton =

Bracteophyton Temporal range: Early Devonian

Scientific classification
- Kingdom: Plantae
- Clade: Tracheophytes
- Clade: †Barinophytes
- Genus: †Bracteophyton; De M.Wang & S.G.Hao (2004)
- Species: †B. variatum

Binomial name
- †Bracteophyton variatum De M.Wang & S.G.Hao (2004)

Extinct genus of vascular plants

Bracteophyton is a genus of extinct vascular plants of the Early Devonian (around 420 to 390 million years ago) comprising a single species, Bracteophyton variatum. Fossils were first found in the Xujiachong Formation of eastern Yunnan, China.

The smooth stems (axes) mainly branched dichotomously. They bore terminal 'spikes' (strobili) consisting of spirally arranged fertile 'units'. Each unit was made up of one or two bracts and a spore-forming organ (sporangium) between a bract and the stem. It appears that the sporangium released its spores by splitting along top. The arrangement of the sporangia resembles that of some zosterophylls, but the plant's discoverers considered its relationships uncertain. In 2013, Hao (one of the discoverers) and Xue listed the genus as a barinophyte.
