= Oricilla =

Oricilla Temporal range: Early Devonian

Scientific classification
- Kingdom: Plantae
- Clade: Tracheophytes
- Clade: Lycophytes
- Plesion: †Zosterophylls
- Order: †incertae sedis
- Family: †Gosslingiaceae
- Genus: †Oricilla

Extinct genus of spore-bearing plants

Oricilla was a genus of Early Devonian land plant with branching axes. Fossils have been found from the Pragian to the Emsian (413 to 393 million years ago).

A cladogram published in 2004 by Crane et al. places Oricilla in the core of a paraphyletic stem group of broadly defined "zosterophylls", basal to the lycopsids (living and extinct clubmosses and relatives).

- lycophytes
  - † Hicklingia
  - - †basal groups
      Adoketophyton, Discalis, Distichophytum (=Rebuchia), Gumuia, Huia, Zosterophyllum myretonianum, Z. llanoveranum, Z. fertile
    - †'core' zosterophylls
      Zosterophyllum divaricatum, Tarella, Oricilla, Gosslingia, Hsua, Thrinkophyton, Protobarinophyton, Barinophyton obscurum, B. citrulliforme, Sawdonia, Deheubarthia, Konioria, Anisophyton, Serrulacaulis, Crenaticaulis
    - - †basal groups
        Nothia, Zosterophyllum deciduum
      - lycopsids
        extant and extinct members

Hao and Xue in 2013 used the absence of terminal sporangia to place the genus in the paraphyletic order Gosslingiales, a group of zosterophylls considered to have indeterminate growth, with fertile branches generally showing circinate vernation (initially curled up). Kenrick and Crane in 1997 also placed the genus in the family Gosslingiaceae, but they place this family in the order Sawdoniales.

== Bibliography ==
- Hao, Shougang & Xue, Jinzhuang (2013). The early Devonian Posongchong flora of Yunnan: a contribution to an understanding of the evolution and early diversification of vascular plants. Beijing: Science Press. ISBN 978-7-03-036616-0.
