= Jugumella =

Jugumella Temporal range: Late Silurian

Scientific classification
- Kingdom: Plantae
- Clade: Tracheophytes
- Clade: Lycophytes
- Plesion: †Zosterophylls
- Genus: †Jugumella

Species
- J. burubaensis; J. jugata

Extinct genus of spore-bearing plants

Jugumella is a genus of extinct plants of the Late Silurian (Přídolí, around 430 to 420 million years ago). Fossils were found in Kazakhstan. Jugumella was considered a possible zosterophyll in a 2006 study. It was listed as a zosterophyll by Hao and Xue in 2013.
