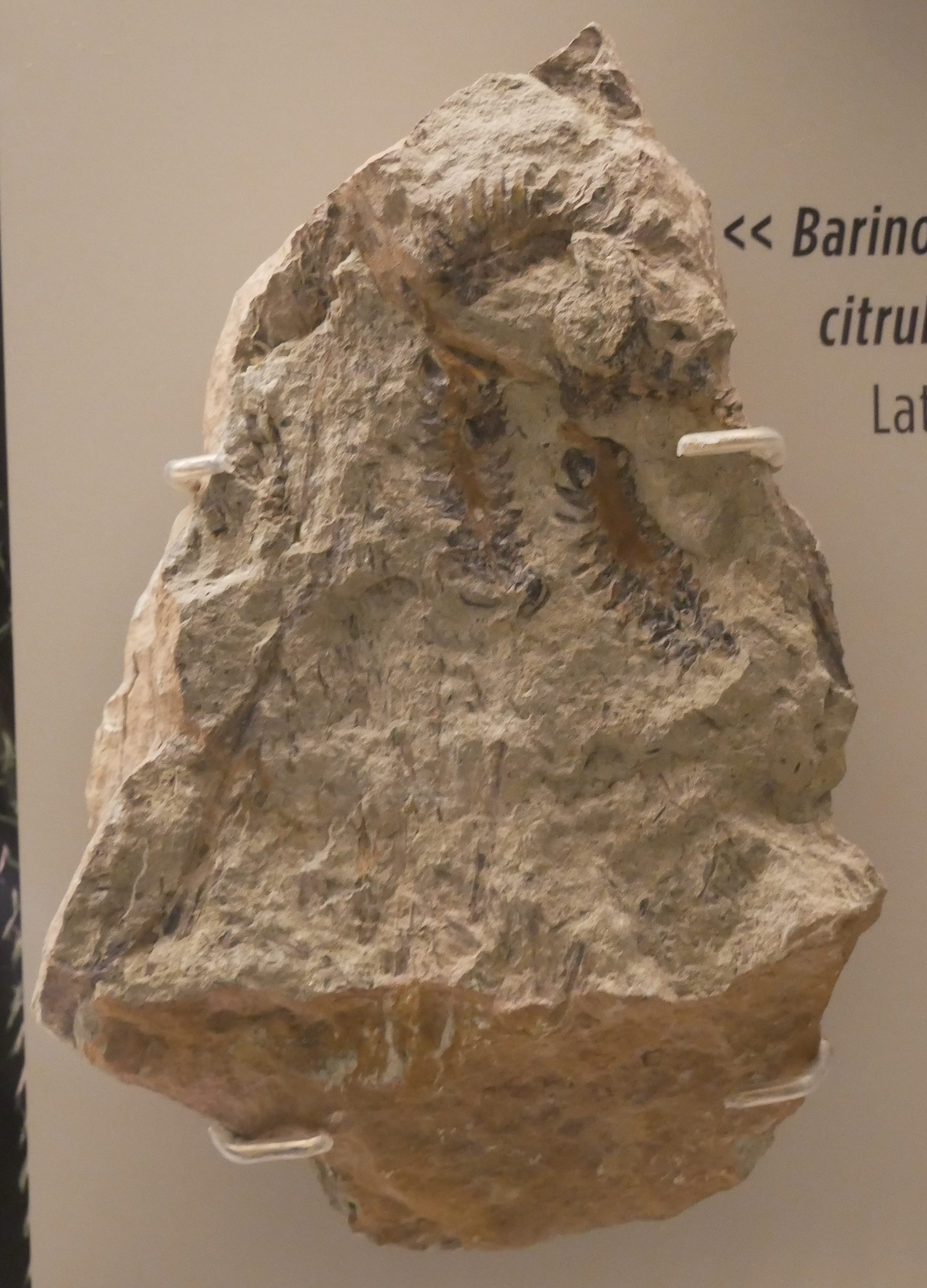
- Barinophyton citruliforme fossil, New York State Museum

Scientific classification
- Kingdom: Plantae
- Clade: Tracheophytes
- Clade: †Barinophytes
- Genus: †Barinophyton; White (1905) emend. Brauer (1980)

Species
- B. citrulliforme Arnold (1939); B. norvegicum (Høeg 1935) Schweitzer & Geisen (2008); B. obscurum (Dun 1898) White (1905); B. perryanum White (1905); B. richardsoni (Dawson 1861) White (1921); B. robustius A.R. Ananiev (1955); B. sibricum Petrosian (1962)

Synonyms
- Pectinophyton Høeg (1935)

= Barinophyton =

Barinophyton Temporal range: Devonian–Carboniferous

Extinct genus of plants

Barinophyton was a genus of early land plant with branching axes. It is placed in a group of early vascular plants (tracheophytes), the barinophytes, a group that has been given various ranks and scientific names. Known fossils are of Devonian to Carboniferous age (420 to 299 million years ago).

== Phylogeny ==
Kenrick and Crane in 1997 placed two species of Barinophyton along with the genus Protobarinophyton in the Barinophytaceae in their Sawdoniales, well nested within the zosterophylls. A summary cladogram produced by Crane et al. in 2004, shows Barinophyton in the core of a paraphyletic stem group of broadly defined zosterophylls, basal to the lycopsids (living and extinct clubmosses and relatives).

- lycophytes
  - † Hicklingia
  - - †basal groups
      Adoketophyton, Discalis, Distichophytum (=Rebuchia), Gumuia, Huia, Zosterophyllum myretonianum, Z. llanoveranum, Z. fertile
    - †'core' zosterophylls
      Zosterophyllum divaricatum, Tarella, Oricilla, Gosslingia, Hsua, Thrinkophyton, Protobarinophyton, Barinophyton obscurum, B. citrulliforme, Sawdonia, Deheubarthia, Konioria, Anisophyton, Serrulacaulis, Crenaticaulis
    - - †basal groups
        Nothia, Zosterophyllum deciduum
      - lycopsids
        extant and extinct members

The phylogenetic position of the barinophytes remains disputed. Taylor et al. in 2009 considered the barinophytes to be possible lycopsids rather than zosterophylls. Hao and Xue in 2013 suggested that they were not lycopsids, instead falling between this group and the euphyllophytes.
