= Discalis =

Discalis Temporal range: Early Devonian

Scientific classification
- Kingdom: Plantae
- Clade: Tracheophytes
- Clade: Lycophytes
- Plesion: †Zosterophylls (?)
- Genus: †Discalis; S.G.Hao (1989)

Species
- †D. longistipa S.G.Hao (1989)

Extinct genus of spore-bearing plants

Discalis is a genus of extinct vascular plants of the Early Devonian (Pragian or Siegenian stage, around 413 to 411 million years ago). The name is derived from the Greek δίσκος, referring to the disc-shaped sporangia (spore-forming organs). The genus was first described by Hao in 1989 based on fossil specimens from the Posongchong Formation, Wenshan district, Yunnan, China.

== Description ==
The leafless sporophyte of D. longistipa consisted of creeping stems (axes) up to 5 millimetres (0.20 in) in diameter with many K- or H-shaped branches as well as upturned or trailing stems, slightly smaller in diameter, which also branched. All stems had irregularly arranged multicellular spines up to 2.5 millimetres (0.098 in) long with expanded tips. The stems which did not bear sporangia had coiled (circinnate) tips. Fertile stems bore disc-shaped sporangia laterally on stalks up to 5 mm long, forming open spikes. The sporangia, which were about 3.7 millimetres (0.15 in) in diameter, had spines like the stems, and split (dehisced) along their margin to release the trilete spores, which were 30–50 micrometres (0.0012–0.0020 in) in diameter. Vascular tissue was present in the stems, with tracheids having annular, spiral thickenings.

D. longistipa somewhat resembles Sawdonia, but differs in branching pattern and in the arrangement of the sporangia, including their long stalks.

== Phylogeny ==
The evolutionary relationship between spines in early plants and the small leaves ('lycophylls') of later lycopsids (club-mosses and allies) has been much discussed. Hao considered that the spines of Discalis could be precursors of lycophylls. Boyce regarded the occurrence of the spines of Discalis on sporangia as evidence that they were not related to lycophylls in this way.

A cladogram published in 2004 by Crane et al. places Discalis in a paraphyletic stem group of broadly defined "zosterophylls", basal to the lycopsids (living and extinct clubmosses and relatives).

- lycophytes
  - † Hicklingia
  - - †basal groups
      Adoketophyton, Discalis, Distichophytum (=Rebuchia), Gumuia, Huia, Zosterophyllum myretonianum, Z. llanoveranum, Z. fertile
    - †'core' zosterophylls
      Zosterophyllum divaricatum, Tarella, Oricilla, Gosslingia, Hsua, Thrinkophyton, Protobarinophyton, Barinophyton obscurum, B. citrulliforme, Sawdonia, Deheubarthia, Konioria, Anisophyton, Serrulacaulis, Crenaticaulis
    - - †basal groups
        Nothia, Zosterophyllum deciduum
      - lycopsids
        extant and extinct members

Hao and Xue in 2013 used the absence of terminal sporangia to place the genus in the paraphyletic order Gosslingiales, in the family Discaliaceae. The Gosslingiales are considered to be zosterophylls with indeterminate growth and fertile branches generally showing circinate vernation (initially curled up).
