= Konioria =

Konioria Temporal range: Early Devonian

Scientific classification
- Kingdom: Plantae
- Clade: Tracheophytes
- Clade: Lycophytes
- Plesion: †Zosterophylls
- Genus: †Konioria

Extinct genus of spore-bearing plants

Konioria was a genus of early land plant with branching axes. Known fossils are of Early Devonian age (420 to 393 million years ago).

A cladogram published in 2004 by Crane et al. places Konioria in the core of a paraphyletic stem group of broadly defined "zosterophylls", basal to the lycopsids (living and extinct clubmosses and relatives).

- lycophytes
  - † Hicklingia
  - - †basal groups
      Adoketophyton, Discalis, Distichophytum (=Rebuchia), Gumuia, Huia, Zosterophyllum myretonianum, Z. llanoveranum, Z. fertile
    - †'core' zosterophylls
      Zosterophyllum divaricatum, Tarella, Oricilla, Gosslingia, Hsua, Thrinkophyton, Protobarinophyton, Barinophyton obscurum, B. citrulliforme, Sawdonia, Deheubarthia, Konioria, Anisophyton, Serrulacaulis, Crenaticaulis
    - - †basal groups
        Nothia, Zosterophyllum deciduum
      - lycopsids
        extant and extinct members

Hao and Xue in 2013 used the absence of terminal sporangia to place the genus in the paraphyletic order Gosslingiales, a group considered to have indeterminate growth, with fertile branches generally showing circinate vernation (initially curled up).
