= Gosferia =

Gosferia Temporal range: Early Devonian

Scientific classification
- Kingdom: Plantae
- Clade: Tracheophytes
- Clade: Lycophytes
- Plesion: †Zosterophylls
- Genus: †Gosferia; P.Gerrienne
- Species: †G. curvata

Binomial name
- †Gosferia curvata P.Gerrienne

Synonyms
- Forgesia Gerrienne, 1991

Extinct genus of spore-bearing plants

Gosferia was a genus of zosterophylls with curved axes and renal sporangia. It is known from Belgium. Its only known species is Gosferia curvata.
