= Crenaticaulis =

Crenaticaulis Temporal range: Emsian

Scientific classification
- Kingdom: Plantae
- Clade: Tracheophytes
- Clade: Lycophytes
- Plesion: †Zosterophylls
- Genus: †Crenaticaulis; Banks & Davis

Species
- †Crenaticaulis verruculosus

Extinct genus of spore-bearing plants

Crenaticaulis was an early genus of slender, dichotomously branching, leafless land plants, known from the Devonian period and first described in 1969. They were probably allied to the zosterophylls, and are assigned to subdivision Zosterophyllophytina, or class Zosterophyllopsida. They bore branches and scalariform tracheids.

A cladogram published in 2004 by Crane et al. places Crenaticaulis in the core of a paraphyletic stem group of broadly defined "zosterophylls", basal to the lycopsids (living and extinct clubmosses and relatives).

- lycophytes
  - † Hicklingia
  - - †basal groups
      Adoketophyton, Discalis, Distichophytum (=Rebuchia), Gumuia, Huia, Zosterophyllum myretonianum, Z. llanoveranum, Z. fertile
    - †'core' zosterophylls
      Zosterophyllum divaricatum, Tarella, Oricilla, Gosslingia, Hsua, Thrinkophyton, Protobarinophyton, Barinophyton obscurum, B. citrulliforme, Sawdonia, Deheubarthia, Konioria, Anisophyton, Serrulacaulis, Crenaticaulis
    - - †basal groups
        Nothia, Zosterophyllum deciduum
      - lycopsids
        extant and extinct members

Hao and Xue in 2013 used the absence of terminal sporangia to place the genus in the family Gosslingiaceae in the paraphyletic order Gosslingiales, a group considered to have indeterminate growth, with fertile branches generally showing circinate vernation (initially curled up). Kenrick and Crane in 1997 placed the genus in the family Sawdoniaceae in the order Sawdoniales.
