= Protobarinophyton =

Protobarinophyton Temporal range: Early Devonian

Scientific classification
- Kingdom: Plantae
- Clade: Tracheophytes
- Clade: †Barinophytes
- Genus: †Protobarinophyton; Ananiev (1955)

Type species
- Protobarinophyton obrutschevii (Ananiev 1954) Ananiev (1955)

Species
- †P. timanicum Petrosjan 1968; †P. obrutschevii (Ananiev 1954) Ananiev (1955); †P. o. f. minutum Petrosjan (1962); †P. o. f. mucronatum Petrosjan (1962)

Extinct genus of vascular plants

Protobarinophyton was a genus of Silu-Devonian land plant with branching axes. It is placed in a group of early vascular plants (tracheophytes), the barinophytes, a group that has been given various ranks and scientific names.

== Phylogeny ==
Kenrick and Crane in 1997 placed the genus Protobarinophyton along with two species of Barinophyton in the Barinophytaceae in their Sawdoniales, well nested within the zosterophylls. A summary cladogram produced by Crane et al. in 2004, shows Protobarinophyton in the core of a paraphyletic stem group of broadly defined zosterophylls, basal to the lycopsids (living and extinct clubmosses and relatives).

- lycophytes
  - † Hicklingia
  - - †basal groups
      Adoketophyton, Discalis, Distichophytum (=Rebuchia), Gumuia, Huia, Zosterophyllum myretonianum, Z. llanoveranum, Z. fertile
    - †'core' zosterophylls
      Zosterophyllum divaricatum, Tarella, Oricilla, Gosslingia, Hsua, Thrinkophyton, Protobarinophyton, Barinophyton obscurum, B. citrulliforme, Sawdonia, Deheubarthia, Konioria, Anisophyton, Serrulacaulis, Crenaticaulis
    - - †basal groups
        Nothia, Zosterophyllum deciduum
      - lycopsids
        extant and extinct members

The phylogenetic position of the barinophytes remains disputed. Taylor et al. in 2009 considered the barinophytes to be possible lycopsids rather than zosterophylls. Hao and Xue in 2013 suggested that they were not lycopsids, instead falling between this group and the euphyllophytes.
