= Venation =

Venation may refer to:

- Venation (botany), the arrangement of veins in leaves
- Wing venation, the arrangement of veins in insect wings

== See also ==
- Vernation, the arrangement of leaves in a bud
