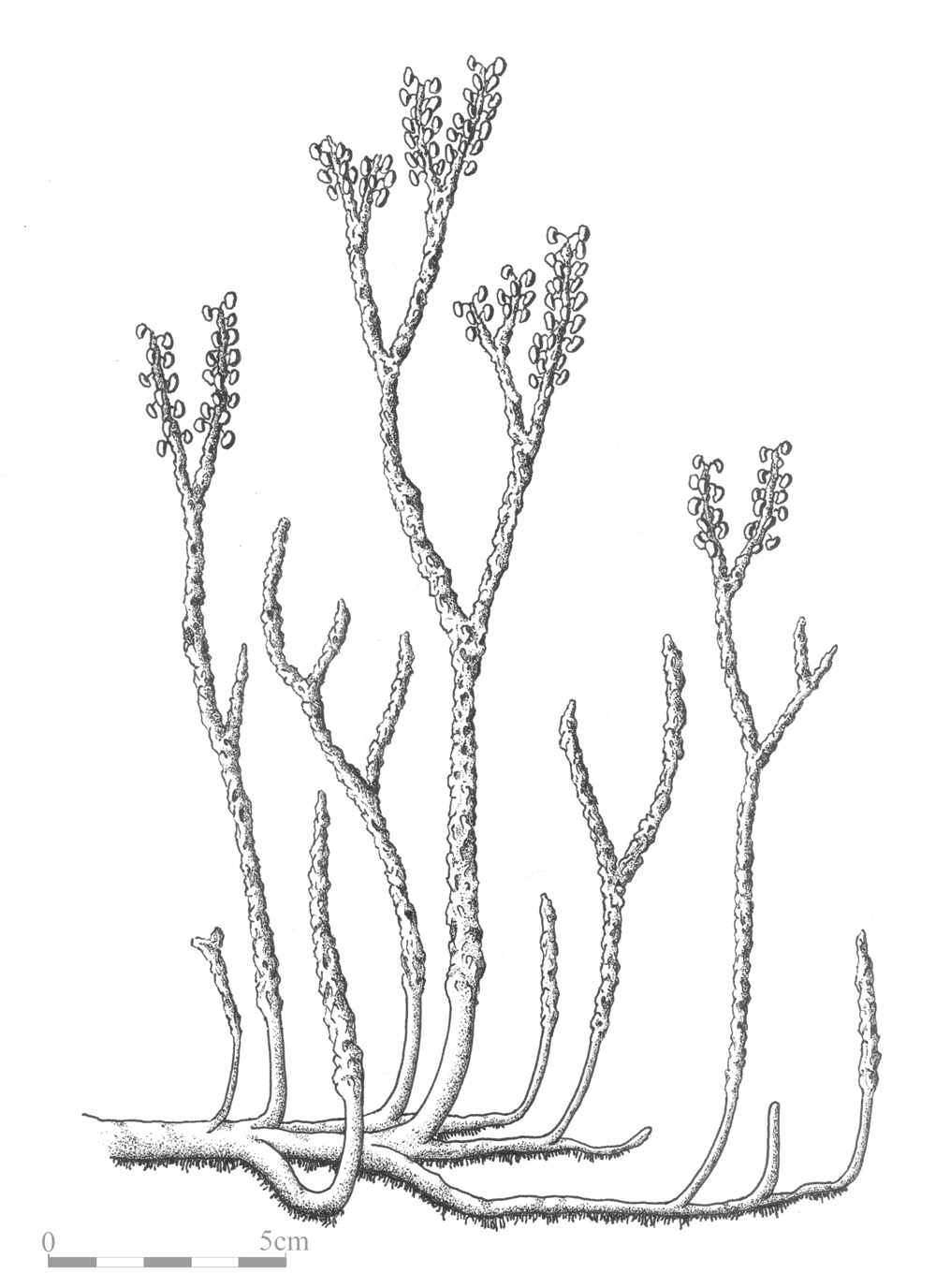

Scientific classification
- Kingdom: Plantae
- Clade: Tracheophytes
- Clade: Lycophytes
- Plesion: †Zosterophylls (?)
- Genus: †Nothia; A.G.Lyon ex El-Saadawy & Lacy
- Species: †N. aphylla

Binomial name
- †Nothia aphylla Lyon ex El-Saadawy & Lacy

= Nothia aphylla =

Nothia aphylla Temporal range: Pragian

Extinct species of spore-bearing plant

Nothia was a genus of Early Devonian vascular plants whose fossils were found in the Rhynie chert in Scotland. It had branching horizontal underground stems (rhizomes) and leafless aerial stems (axes) bearing lateral and terminal spore-forming organs (sporangia). Its aerial stems were covered with small 'bumps' (emergences), each bearing a stoma. It is one of the best described early land plants. Its classification remains uncertain, although it has been treated as a zosterophyll. There is one species, Nothia aphylla.

== History of discovery ==
Fossilized remains, including bare stems (axes) and detached spore-forming organs (sporangia), were first described by Kidston and Lang in 1920 from the Rhynie chert of Aberdeenshire, Scotland – rocks which are of Pragian age (413 to 411 million years ago). The fragments were considered to be parts of Asteroxylon mackiei. In 1964 Lyon described sporangia belonging to Asteroxylon mackiei and suggested that Kidston and Lang's specimens were a new species which he called Nothia aphylla. The first full description based on further specimens was published in 1979. A very detailed description was published in 2001, making this species one of the best-known early polysporangiophytes.

== Description ==
Reconstruction of the rhizomes of Nothia aphylla, based on Kerp, Hass & Mosbrugger 2001

Stylized reconstruction of part of the fertile region of the aerial stem of Nothia aphylla, based on Kerp, Hass & Mosbrugger 2001

The sporophyte of Nothia aphylla consisted of thin underground and aerial stems (axes). The underground stems or rhizomes were up to 2 mm in diameter and branched laterally. The underside of the rhizomes had a longitudinal ridge from which unicellular rhizoids emerged. There were no true roots. At intervals the rhizomes turned upwards to emerge as upright stems. Around the region of the upwards bend, horizontal branches appeared at right angles to continue the growth of the rhizomes. The upright stems were generally less than 2.5 mm in diameter; a reconstruction suggests a height of around 20 cm. Aerial stems branched dichotomously in a three-dimensional pattern, with the last two sets of branches bearing sporangia. The sporangia were attached by short stalks at the end and along the sides of the stem, in a more-or-less spiral fashion. The stalks curved upwards so that the sporangia were roughly upright. Spores were released through a longitudinal slit which appeared at the apex of the sporangia. The spores were trilete and around 65 μm in diameter. Both the horizontal rhizomes and the vertical stems had vascular tissue which formed a central core (protostele), and is described as having centrarch development. The precise structure of the vascular core varied between the rhizomes and the aerial stems.

Although Nothia aphylla was leafless, its aerial stems were covered with 'emergences': bumps on the stems which were oval, around 0.3 mm high and 0.7 to 1.2 mm long by up to 0.5 mm wide. The emergences were formed by existing cells expanding, not by extra cells being produced as in other Early Devonian zosterophylls and trimerophytes. Each emergence had a single stoma. The density of the emergences varied so that in regions which had them there were between 3 and 5 or more stomata per mm^{2}. The sporangia did not have emergences, although there were a few stomata.

Kerp et al. suggest that Nothia aphylla was a geophyte which inhabited sandy soils and had a clonal life-style. The underground rhizomes persisted from year to year, continually spreading via lateral branches. The aerial stems appeared annually. They base this analysis on a number of features, including evidence that the rhizomes were subterranean, and that rhizomes were still living when erect stems had decayed.

The plant described as Kidstonophyton discoides is possibly the male gametophyte of Nothia aphylla.

== Taxonomy ==
The genus and species were first named by Lyon in 1964. However, Nothia aphylla has been regarded as a nomen nudum since no description was published along with the name. Validation of the name has been variously considered to have been by Høeg in 1967, making the botanical authority "Lyon ex Høeg", or by El-Saadawy and Lacy in 1979, making the authority "Lyon ex El-Saadawy & Lacy".

Nothia has been placed in the group initially established by Banks as the subdivision Zosterophyllophytina or the class Zosterophyllopsida (zosterophylls). El-Saadawy and Lacy regard the plant as having affinities with both the rhyniophytes and the zosterophylls. As discussed further below, Kerp et al. regard its taxonomic placement as unclear.

== Phylogeny ==
A cladogram published in 2004 by Crane et al. places Nothia in a paraphyletic stem group of broadly defined "zosterophylls", basal to the lycopsids (living and extinct clubmosses and relatives).

- lycophytes
  - † Hicklingia
  - - †basal groups
      Adoketophyton, Discalis, Distichophytum (=Rebuchia), Gumuia, Huia, Zosterophyllum myretonianum, Z. llanoveranum, Z. fertile
    - †'core' zosterophylls
      Zosterophyllum divaricatum, Tarella, Oricilla, Gosslingia, Hsua, Thrinkophyton, Protobarinophyton, Barinophyton obscurum, B. citrulliforme, Sawdonia, Deheubarthia, Konioria, Anisophyton, Serrulacaulis, Crenaticaulis
    - - †basal groups
        Nothia, Zosterophyllum deciduum
      - lycopsids
        extant and extinct members

A detailed study of Nothia aphylla questions this positioning of the genus, concluding that its taxonomic placement remains unclear, and that the cladistic analyses of Kenrick and Crane (on which the above cladogram is based) have ignored "fundamental differences" between different kinds of emergences (protrusions from stems). Features of the vascular tissue of typical zosterophylls, such as characteristic thickenings of the cells which conduct water, are also absent in Nothia. Earlier, El Saadawy and Lacey had concluded that Nothia was in some ways intermediate between the rhyniophytes and the zosterophylls. Hao and Xue in 2013 listed the genus as a zosterophyll.
