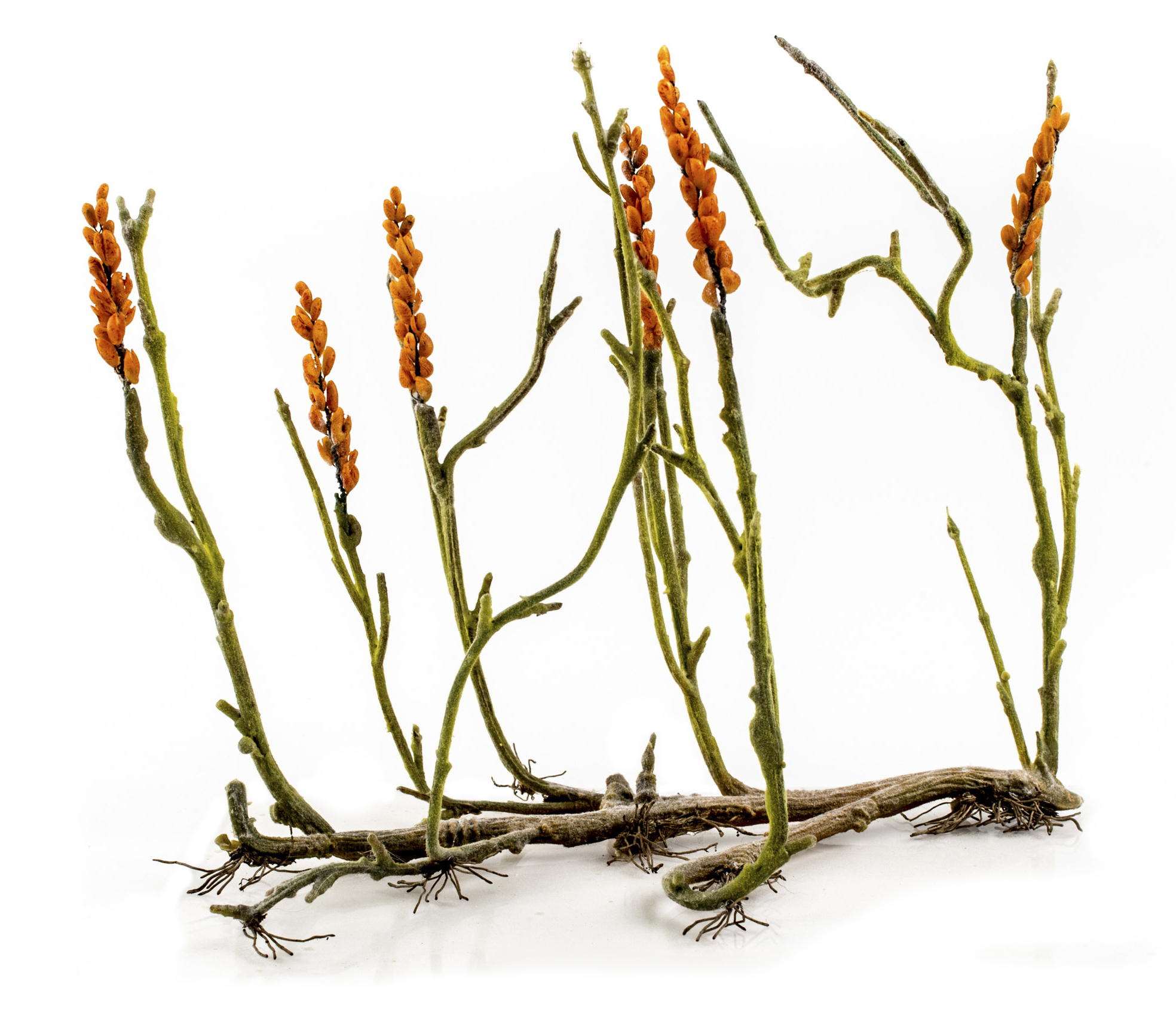
- Reconstruction of Zosterophyllum sp. at MUSE - Science Museum in Trento

Scientific classification
- Kingdom: Plantae
- Clade: Embryophytes
- Clade: Tracheophytes
- Clade: Lycophytes
- Plesion: †Zosterophylls
- Genus: †Zosterophyllum; Penh. (1892)

Type species
- Zosterophyllum myretonianum Penhallow (1892)

Species
- See text

= Zosterophyllum =

Zosterophyllum Temporal range: Silurian–Devonian

Extinct genus of spore-bearing plants

Zosterophyllum was a genus of Silurian-Devonian vascular land plants with naked branching axes on which usually kidney-shaped sporangia were arranged in lateral positions. It is the type genus for the group known as zosterophylls, thought to be part of the lineage from which modern lycophytes evolved. More than 20 species have been described.

== Description ==
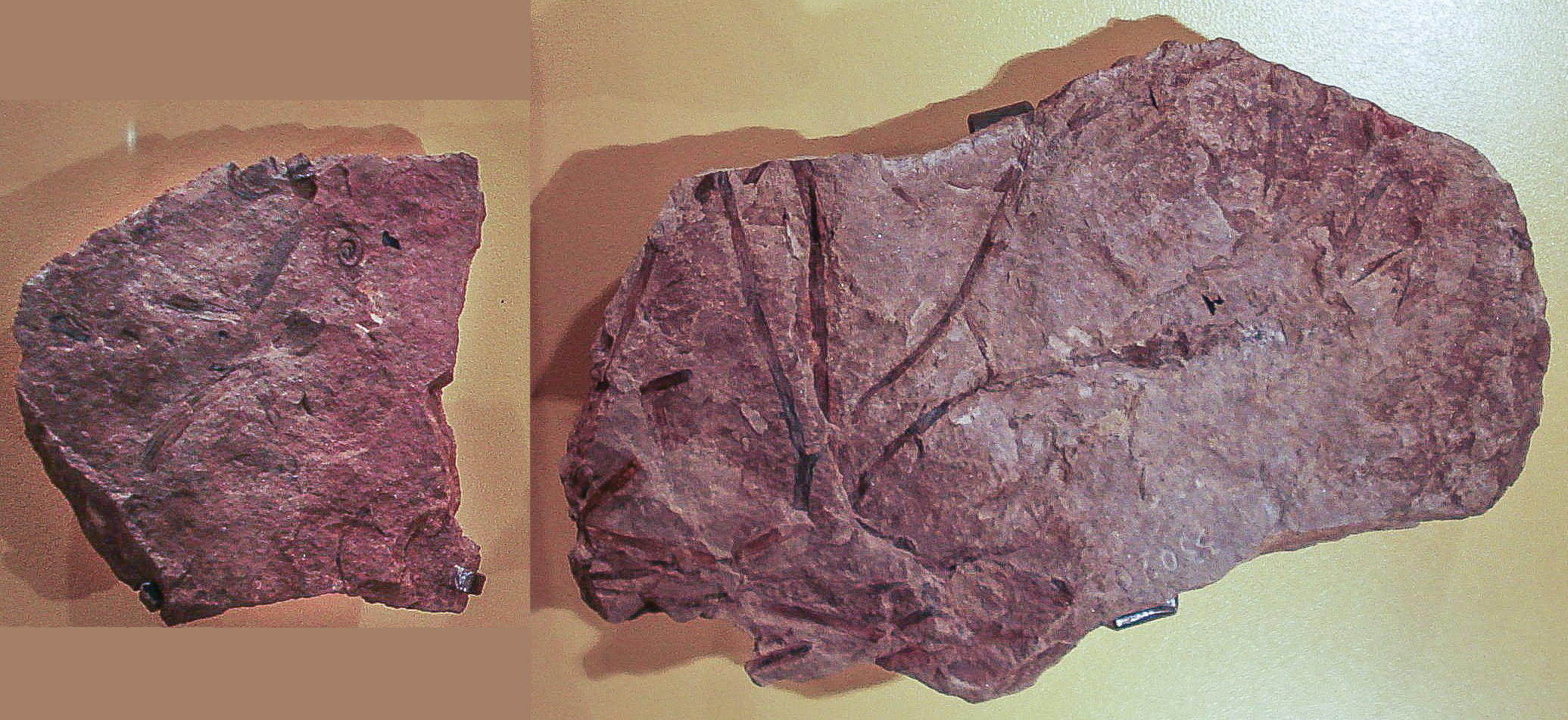
Zosterophyllum fossils from North Rhine-Westphalia; left: showing curled (circinnate) branch tip; right: with sporangium

The diagnostic features of the genus have changed since its first description in 1892, as the original species (Zosterophyllum myretonianum) has become better known, and as other species have been discovered. Zosterophyllum is a vascular plant. The axes (stems) are naked, lacking leaves or outgrowths ("enations"). When branching occurs, the branches are either isotomous (equally sized) or pseudomonopodial (one branch is larger than the other but still clearly involves division of the original axis rather a distinct side growth). The sporangia are upright on short stalks. In face view, they are flattened, usually kidney-shaped (reniform). They open (dehisce) along the top forming two equally sized valves. Sporangia are grouped into a compact spike in which they are either helically arranged or form distinct rows (e.g. Z. llanoveranum).

Z. myretonianum is thought to have been semiaquatic.

== Taxonomy ==
The genus Zosterophyllum was erected in 1892 by David P. Penhallow for the type species Zosterophyllum myretonianum, based on fossils found at Myreton quarry near Dundee, Scotland, in Lower Devonian rocks (from about 420 to 393 million years ago).

Species with radially symmetrical spikes of sporangia have been placed in subgenus Zosterophyllum, those with bilaterally symmetrical spikes in subgenus Platyzosterophyllum. Hao and Xue in 2013 used the absence of terminal sporangia to place some species, such as Z. llanoveranum, in the paraphyletic order Gosslingiales, a group of zosterophylls considered to have indeterminate growth, with fertile branches generally showing circinate vernation (initially curled up). Other species, such as Z. myretonianum, were not placed in the order, as they did not have terminal sporangia.

=== Phylogeny ===
A cladogram published in 2004 by Crane et al. places the species of Zosterophyllum in a paraphyletic stem group of broadly defined "zosterophylls", basal to the lycopsids (living and extinct clubmosses and relatives). On this view, the genus is not monophyletic.

- lycophytes
  - † Hicklingia
  - - †basal groups
      Adoketophyton, Discalis, Distichophytum (=Rebuchia), Gumuia, Huia, Zosterophyllum myretonianum, Z. llanoveranum, Z. fertile
    - †'core' zosterophylls
      Zosterophyllum divaricatum, Tarella, Oricilla, Gosslingia, Hsua, Thrinkophyton, Protobarinophyton, Barinophyton obscurum, B. citrulliforme, Sawdonia, Deheubarthia, Konioria, Anisophyton, Serrulacaulis, Crenaticaulis
    - - †basal groups
        Nothia, Zosterophyllum deciduum
      - lycopsids
        extant and extinct members

A cladistic analysis by Hao and Xue in 2013 agreed that Zosterophyllum is not monophyletic, with the three species of Zosterophyllum they included falling into different clades, some being closer to the Gosslingiales than others. Their analysis differed in producing a monophyletic clade of zosterophylls (their Zosterophyllopsida).

=== Species ===
Species that have been described include:

- †Z. arcticum Kotyk (1998) nom. inv.
- †Z. australianum Lang & Cookson (1931)
- †Z. bifurcatum Li & Cai (1977) – fragmentary
- †Z. baoyangense Huang & Xue (2025)
- †Z. bohemicum (Kräusel & Weyland 1933) Obrhel (1959)
- †Z. bokkeveldense Plumstead (1977)
- †Z. confertum Gossmann et al (2021)
- †Z. deciduum Gerrienne (1988)
- †Z. devriesii Plumstead (1977)
- †Z. dispersum Zakharova (1983)
- †Z. divaricatum Gensel (1982)
- †Z. dushanense Li & Cai (1977)
- †Z. fertile Leclercq (1942)
- †Z. llanoveranum Croft & Lang (1942)
- †Z. longhuashanense Li & Cai (1977) – fragmentary
- †Z. longum (Høeg 1942) Høeg (1967)
- †Z. minifertillum Hao & Xue (2013)
- †Z. minor Ananiev (1960)
- †Z. minorstachyum Xue (2009)
- †Z. myretonianum Penhallow (1892)
- †Z. ovatum Edwards & Li (2018)
- †Z. qujingense Hao, Xue & Wang (2007)
- †Z. ramosum Hao & Wang (2000)
- †Z. reflexum Kotyk (1998) nom. inv.
- †Z. rhenanum Kräusel & Weyland (1935)
- †Z. shengfengense Hao et al. (2010)
- †Z. sinense Li & Cai (1977)
- †Z. spathulatum Li & Cai (1977) – fragmentary
- †Z. spectabile Schweitzer (1979)
- †Z. tenerum Hao & Xue (2013)
- †Z. xishanense Hao, Xue & Wang (2007)
- †Z. uimenense Udodov et al. (1971)
- †Z. yunnanicum Hsu (1966)

Some species have been transferred to other genera:

- Z. artesianum Danzé-Corsin (1956) to Danziella artesiana
- Z. contiguum Li & Cai (1977) to Demersatheca contigua
- Z. minutum Tims (1980) to Gippslandites minutus
- Z. longa Wang (2007) to Yanmenia longa
- Z. subverticillatum Li & Cai (1977) to Adoketophyton subverticillatum
- Z. sichuanense Geng (1992) to Ornicephalum sichuanense
- Z. timanianum Tschibrikova et al. (1999) to Gutzeitia timanica

== Bibliography ==
- Hao, Shougang & Xue, Jinzhuang (2013). The early Devonian Posongchong flora of Yunnan: a contribution to an understanding of the evolution and early diversification of vascular plants. Beijing: Science Press. ISBN 978-7-03-036616-0.
