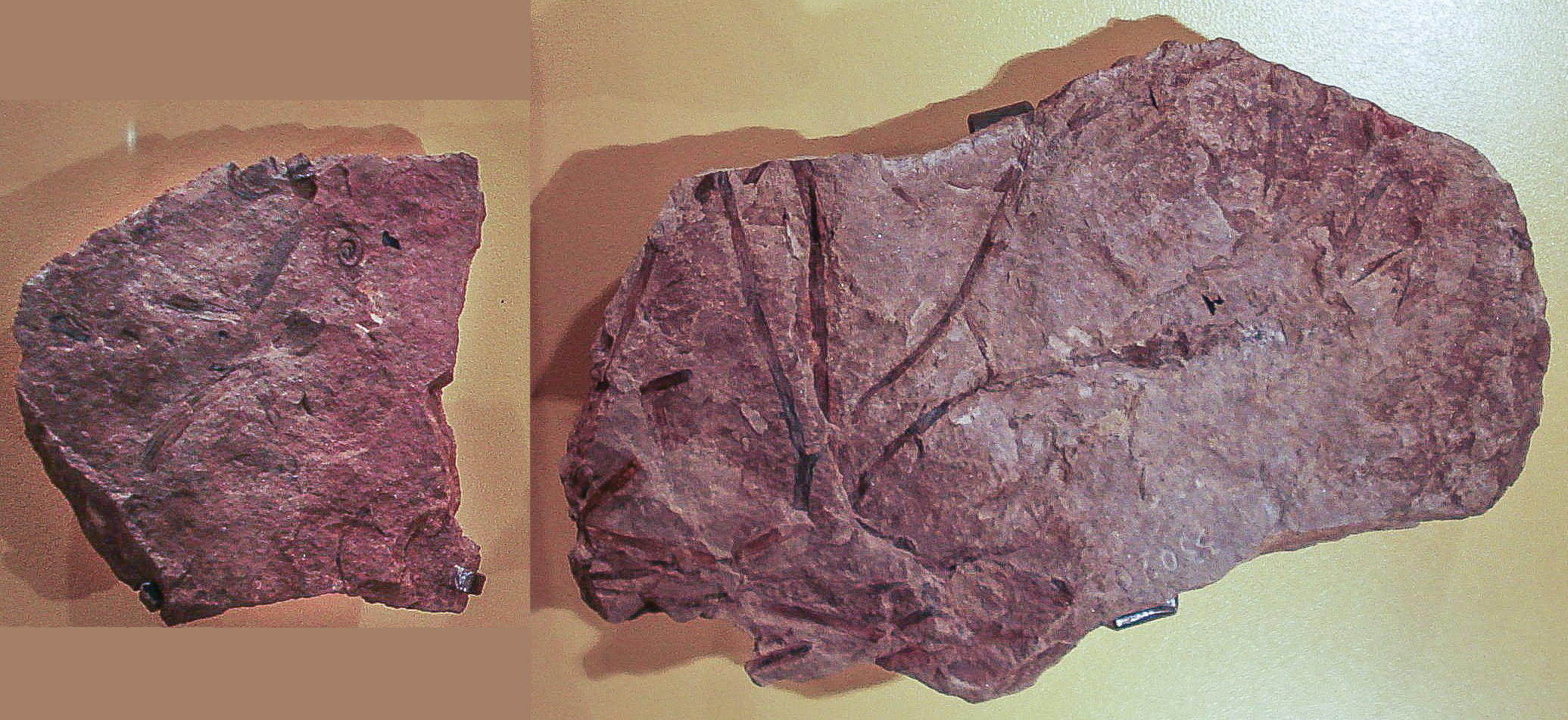
- Zosterophyllum species fossils; left: with coiled (circinate) branch tips, right: with sporangium
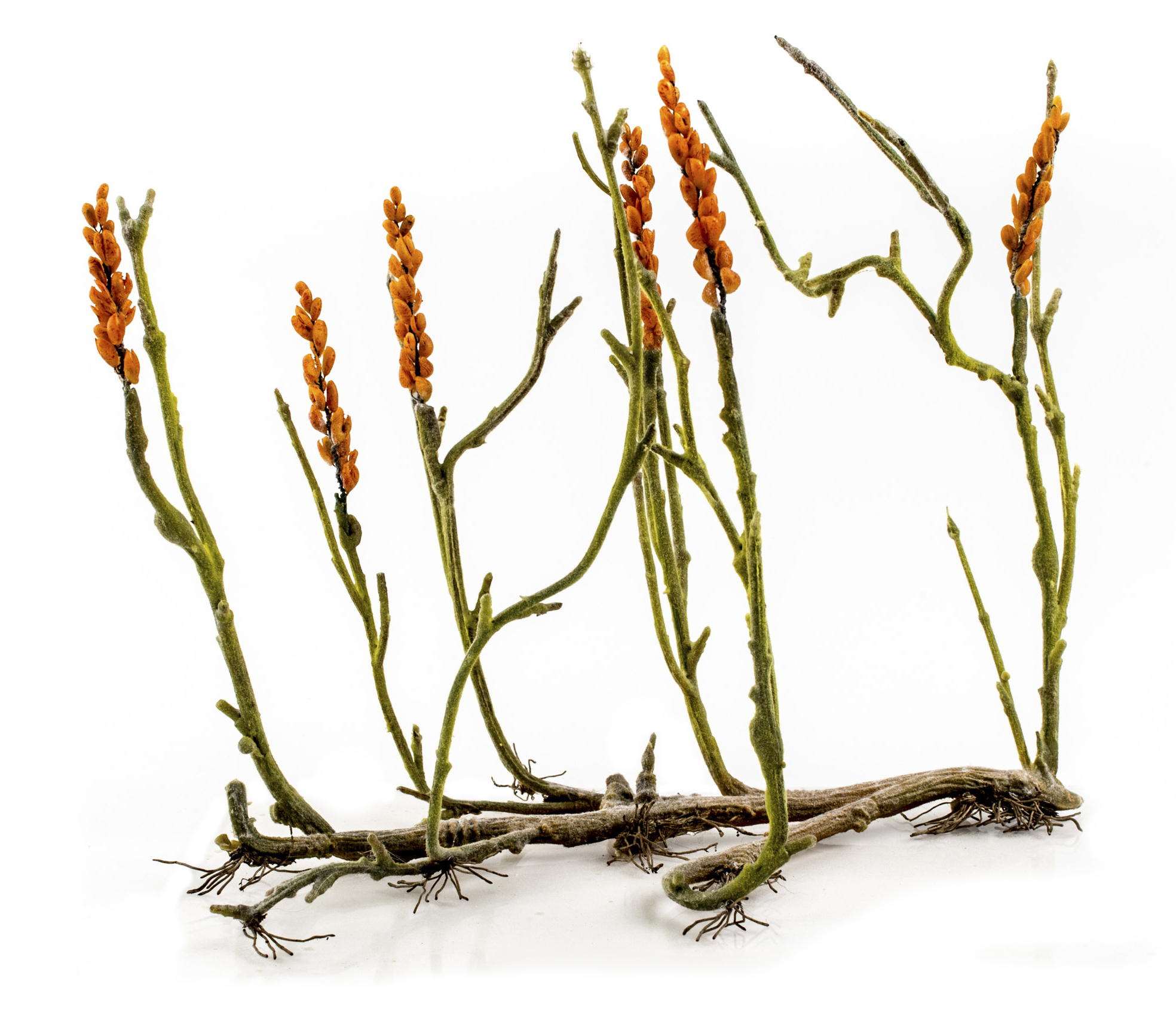
- Zosterophyllum Life restoration from MUSE

Scientific classification
- Kingdom: Plantae
- Clade: Tracheophytes
- Clade: Lycophytes
- Plesion: †Zosterophylls

Orders
- ?Barinophytales; Sawdoniales; Zosterophyllales

= Zosterophyll =

Zosterophyll Temporal range: Ludlow to Devonian

Group of extinct land plants

The zosterophylls are a group of extinct land plants that first appeared in the Silurian period. The taxon was first established by Banks in 1968 as the subdivision Zosterophyllophytina; they have since also been treated as the division Zosterophyllophyta or Zosterophyta and the class or plesion Zosterophyllopsida or Zosteropsida. They were among the first vascular plants in the fossil record, and had a world-wide distribution. They were probably stem-group lycophytes, forming a sister group to the ancestors of the living lycophytes. By the late Silurian (late Ludlovian, about 420 million years ago) a diverse assemblage of species existed, examples of which have been found fossilised in what is now Bathurst Island in Arctic Canada.

== Morphology ==
Reconstruction of the zosterophyll Sawdonia ornata

The stems of zosterophylls were either smooth or covered with small spines known as enations, branched dichotomously, and grew at the ends by unrolling, a process known as circinate vernation. The stems had a central vascular column in which the protoxylem was exarch, and the metaxylem developed centripetally. The sporangia were kidney-shaped (reniform), with conspicuous lateral dehiscence and were borne laterally in a fertile zone towards the tips of the branches.

The zosterophylls were named after the aquatic flowering plant Zostera from a mistaken belief that the two groups were related. David P. Penhallow's generic description of the type genus Zosterophyllum refers to "Aquatic plants with creeping stems, from which arise narrow dichotomous branches and narrow linear leaves of the aspect of Zostera." Zosterophyllum rhenanum was reconstructed as aquatic, the lack of stomata on the lower axes giving support to this interpretation. However, current opinion is that the Zosterophylls were terrestrial plants, and Penhallow's "linear leaves" are interpreted as the aerial stems of the plant that had become flattened during fossilization.

Stomata were present, particularly on the upper axes. Their absence on the lower portions of the axes suggests that this part of the plants may have been submerged, and that the plants dwelt in boggy ground or even shallow water. In many fossils these appear to consist of a slit-like opening in the middle of a single elongated guard cell, leading to comparison with the stomata of some mosses. However, this is now thought to result from the loss of the wall separating paired guard cells during fossilisation.

== Taxonomy and classification ==
At first most of the fossilized early land plants other than bryophytes were placed in the class Psilophyta, established in 1917 by Kidston and Lang. As additional fossils were discovered and described, it became apparent that the Psilophyta were not a homogeneous group of plants, and in 1975 Banks developed his earlier proposal to split it into three groups, which he put at the rank of subdivision. One of these was the subdivision Zosterophyllophytina, named after the genus Zosterophyllum. For Banks, zosterophyllophytes or zosterophylls comprised plants with lateral sporangia which released their spores by splitting distally (i.e. away from their attachment), and which had exarch strands of xylem. Bank's classification produces the hierarchy:

Division Tracheata
Subdivision †Zosterophyllophytina = zosterophyllophytes, zosterophylls
Subdivision Lycophytina = lycopods
+ other subdivisions

Those who treat most of the extant groups of plants as divisions may raise both the zosterophylls and the Lycophytina sensu Banks to the rank of division:

Division Zosterophyllophyta = zosterophylls, zosterophyllophytes
Division Lycophyta = lycophytes

In their cladistic study published in 1997, Kenrick and Crane provided support for a clade uniting both the zosterophylls and the lycopsids, producing a classification which places the zosterophylls in a class Zosterophyllopsida of the subdivision Lycophytina:

Division Tracheata
Subdivision Lycophytina = lycophytes
Class †Zosterophyllopsida = zosterophylls
Class Lycopodiopsida = lycopsids

This approach has been widely used alongside previous systems. A consequence is that "lycophyte" and corresponding formal names such as "Lycophyta" and "Lycophytina" are used by different authors in at least two senses: either excluding zosterophylls in the sense of Banks or including them in the sense of Kenrick and Crane.

A further complication is that the cladograms of Kenrick and Crane show that the zosterophylls, broadly defined, are paraphyletic, but contain a 'core' clade of plants with marked bilateral symmetry and circinate tips. The class Zosterophyllopsida sensu Kenrick & Crane may be restricted to this core clade, leaving many genera (e.g. Hicklingia, Nothia) with no systematic placement other than Lycophytina sensu Kenrick & Crane, but nevertheless still informally called "zosterophylls".

Under whatever name and rank, the zosterophylls have been divided into orders and families, e.g. the Zosterophyllales containing the Zosterophyllaceae and the Sawdoniales containing the Sawdoniaceae. Since the publication of cladograms showing that the group is paraphyletic divisions of the class have been less used, being ignored, for example, in the 2009 paleobotany textbook by Taylor et al.

== Phylogeny ==
In 2004, Crane et al. published a unified cladogram for the polysporangiophytes (plants with branched stems bearing sporangia), based on cladistic analyses of morphological features. This suggests that the zosterophylls were a paraphyletic stem group, related to the ancestors of modern lycophytes.

- †Hicklingia
- - †basal groups (Adoketophyton, Discalis, Distichophytum (=Rebuchia), Gumuia, Huia, Zosterophyllum myretonianum, Z. lianoveranum, Z. fertile)
  - †'core' zosterophylls (Zosterophyllum divaricatum, Tarella, Oricilla, Gosslingia, Hsua, Thrinkophyton, Protobarinophyton, Barinophyton obscurum, B. citrulliforme, Sawdonia, Deheubarthia, Konioria, Anisophyton, Serrulacaulis, Crenaticaulis)
  - - †basal groups (Nothia, Zosterophyllum deciduum)
    - lycopsids (extant and extinct members)

== Genera ==
Genera which are included at or around the zosterophyll position in the cladogram or have otherwise been included in the group by at least one source, and hence may be considered zosterophylls in the broadest sense, are listed below. "B" indicates genera included by Banks in his 1975 description of Zosterophyllophytina.

- Adoketophyton
- Anisophyton
- Barinophyton
- Bathurstia (B)
- Crenaticaulis (B)
- Danziella
- Deheubarthia
- Demersatheca
- Discalis
- Distichophytum (B)
- Gosferia (= Forgesia)
- Gosslingia (B)
- Guangnania
- Gumuia
- Hicklingia
- Hsua
- Huia
- Jugumella
- Konioria
- Macivera
- Nothia
- Nowenia
- Oricilla
- Protobarinophyton
- Ramoferis
- Rebuchia, see Distichophytum
- Sawdonia (B)
- Serrulacaulis
- Tarella
- Thrinkophyton
- Trichopherophyton
- Ventarura
- Wenshania
- Xitunia
- Yunia
- Zosterophyllum (B)

Genera may not be assigned to this group by other authors; for example, Adoketophyton was regarded by Hao et al., who named the genus, as having evolved separately from the lycopsids, so that its taxonomic placement was uncertain. Barinophytes, like Barinophyton, have been considered to be possible lycopsids, or to fall between the lycopsids and the euphyllophytes.

== See also ==
- Drepanophycales, a clade of early lycopods
