= Catenalis =

Catenalis Temporal range: Early Devonian

Scientific classification
- Kingdom: Plantae
- Clade: Embryophytes
- Genus: †Catenalis; S.G.Hao & C.B.Beck (1991)

Species
- C. digitata S.G.Hao & C.B.Beck (1991)

Extinct genus of Devonian plants

Catenalis is a genus of extinct plants of the Early Devonian (Pragian, around 410 million years ago). Fossils were first found in the Posongchong Formation of eastern Yunnan, China. The leafless stems (axes) bore 10-12 elliptical spore-forming organs or sporangia on side branches. To release their spores, the sporangia split at the opposite end to their attachment to the stem. Its phylogenetic relationship to other land plants is considered uncertain at present.
