= Huia (plant) =

Huia Temporal range: Early Devonian

Scientific classification
- Kingdom: Plantae
- Clade: Tracheophytes
- Clade: Lycophytes (?)
- Genus: †Huia; Geng

Species
- † H. recurvata B.Y.Geng; † H. gracilis De M.Wang & S.G.Hao

Extinct genus of spore-bearing plants

Huia is a genus of extinct vascular plants of the Early Devonian (Pragian or Siegenian, around 410 million years ago). The genus was first described in 1985 based on fossil specimens from the Posongchong Formation, Wenshan district, Yunnan, China.

== Description ==
The sporophyte of H. recurvata consisted of leafless stems (axes), branching both dichotomously and pseudomonopodially (i.e. with unequal divisions creating a 'main stem'). The sporangia (spore-forming organs) were born in terminal spikes on fertile stems, with the sporangia spirally arranged on stalks which curved downwards. The central strand of vascular tissue contained G-type tracheids. It was initially provisionally assigned to the "rhyniophytes". However, this group is defined as having terminal sporangia, whereas those of Huia are lateral, suggesting affinity with the zosterophylls. The Huia plant may show traits of being similar to Lycophytina but has ovate reflexed sporangia which are long stalked and dehisce longitudinally while being vascular, making it more like a vascular plant (tracheophyte).

A second species, H. gracilis, was described from the Xujiachong Formation (Pragian–early Emsian), Qujing district, Yunnan, China. It differs from H. recurvata in its more slender morphology and its lack of pseudomonopodial branching. The adaxial sporangia, which were oval or elongated oval in shape, split (dehisced) along their length at right angles to the stem. It is suggested that Huia may have originated from early Cooksonia-like plants. Others suggest that its position is uncertain.

== Phylogeny ==
A cladogram published in 2004 by Crane et al. places Huia in a paraphyletic stem group of broadly defined "zosterophylls", basal to the lycopsids (living and extinct clubmosses and relatives).

- lycophytes
  - † Hicklingia
  - - †basal groups
      Adoketophyton, Discalis, Distichophytum (=Rebuchia), Gumuia, Huia, Zosterophyllum myretonianum, Z. llanoveranum, Z. fertile
    - †'core' zosterophylls
      Zosterophyllum divaricatum, Tarella, Oricilla, Gosslingia, Hsua, Thrinkophyton, Protobarinophyton, Barinophyton obscurum, B. citrulliforme, Sawdonia, Deheubarthia, Konioria, Anisophyton, Serrulacaulis, Crenaticaulis
    - - †basal groups
        Nothia, Zosterophyllum deciduum
      - lycopsids
        extant and extinct members

By contrast, Hao and Xue in 2013 listed the genus as a rhyniophyte, thus placing it outside the zosterophylls and even lycophytes.
