= Distichophytum =

Distichophytum Temporal range: Ludfordian–Emsian

Scientific classification
- Kingdom: Plantae
- Clade: Tracheophytes
- Clade: Lycophytes
- Plesion: †Zosterophylls
- Genus: †Distichophytum; Mägd. (1938)

Species
- † D. ovatum (Dorf emend Hueber) Schweitzer † D. mucronatum Mägd. For synonyms, see the Taxonomy section of the article.

Extinct genus of spore-bearing plants

Distichophytum is a genus of extinct vascular plants of the Late Silurian (Ludfordian) to Early Devonian (Emsian), around 425 to 393 million years ago. The genus has a tangled taxonomic history, also being known as Bucheria and Rebuchia (see below).

== Description ==
Stylized reconstruction of the habit of Distichophytum ovatum. Based on the information in Hueber 1972, but not the figure, which is more 'realistic'.

The genus was first discovered as fossils of Early Devonian age (Pragian or Siegenian to Emsian, 413 to 393 million years ago), consisting of isolated spikes of sporangia (spore-forming organs) found at Beartooth Butte, Wyoming, United States of America. Specimens of D. ovata with sporangia attached to stems were later found at the same location. The base of the plant remains unknown; the known part was about 8.5 cm high. The sporophyte consisted of narrow leafless stems (axes) 1.5 to 2.0 mm in diameter, which branched dichotomously. Stems which did not bear sporangia ended in blunt points; fertile branches bore compact one-sided spikes of up to 20 laterally attached sporangia, more-or-less opposite. The sporangia were kidney-shaped (reniform) and had short stalks around 1.5 mm long which curved so that all the sporangia were on one side of the stem. The sporangia split (dehisced) distally into two equal parts in order to release the unornamented spores. Specimens from the Pragian flora of Bathurst Island, Nunavut, Canada, were later also assigned to this species, although their sporangia were smaller.

A second possible species, D. mucronatum, has narrower, less branched stems and smaller, somewhat differently shaped sporangia than D. ovata. Hueber considered the differences in sporangial shape were caused by compression and that the other differences were too small to warrant a different species; Schweitzer put the two in the same genus but as different species. A third possible species was discovered in sediments from Bathurst Island, Nunavut, Canada, from the Late Silurian (Ludfordian, 425 to 423 million years ago); it was not assigned a species name as poor preservation obscured the sporangial shape.

== Taxonomy ==
The genus has a somewhat tangled taxonomic history which has been clarified by Kotyk et al. The genus Bucheria Dorf was created in 1933 for what is now D. ovata. Independently, Distichophytum Mägdefrau was created in 1938 for D. mucronatum. Later, Bucheria Dorf was discovered to be homonym of Bucheria Heynhold of 1846, and the alternative Rebuchia (an anagram of Bucheria) was suggested provisionally by Høeg in 1967, but only as a form genus for poorly preserved spikes. Rebuchia was formally established by Hueber in 1970 as a replacement for the invalid Bucheria Dorf. However, Hueber regarded Bucheria ovata Dorf and Distichophytum mucronatum Mägdefrau as the same species; in which case the name Distichophytum had priority over his Rebuchia and should have been used as the genus name.

== Phylogeny ==
On the basis of the shape of the sporangia (reniform), their lateral position on the stem, borne on short stalks, and their mode of dehiscence, Hueber placed the genus in the Zosterophyllophytina. A cladogram published in 2004 by Crane et al. agrees in placing Distichophytum (as Rebuchia in the original) in a paraphyletic stem group of broadly defined "zosterophylls", basal to the lycopsids (living and extinct clubmosses and relatives).

- lycophytes
  - † Hicklingia
  - - †basal groups
      Adoketophyton, Discalis, Distichophytum (=Rebuchia), Gumuia, Huia, Zosterophyllum myretonianum, Z. llanoveranum, Z. fertile
    - †'core' zosterophylls
      Zosterophyllum divaricatum, Tarella, Oricilla, Gosslingia, Hsua, Thrinkophyton, Protobarinophyton, Barinophyton obscurum, B. citrulliforme, Sawdonia, Deheubarthia, Konioria, Anisophyton, Serrulacaulis, Crenaticaulis
    - - †basal groups
        Nothia, Zosterophyllum deciduum
      - lycopsids
        extant and extinct members

Hao and Xue in 2013 listed the genus as a zosterophyll.
