= Gumuia =

Gumuia Temporal range: Early Devonian

Scientific classification
- Kingdom: Plantae
- Clade: Tracheophytes
- Clade: Lycophytes
- Plesion: †Zosterophylls
- Genus: †Gumuia; S.G.Hao (1989)

Species
- †G. zyzzata S.G.Hao (1989)

Extinct genus of spore-bearing plants

Gumuia is a genus of extinct vascular plants of the Early Devonian (Pragian or Siegenian, around 410 million years ago). The genus was first described in 1989 based on fossil specimens from the Posongchong Formation, Wenshan district, Yunnan, China.

== Description and phylogeny ==
The sporophyte of G. zyzzata consisted of leafless stems (axes) with an apparently sympodial organization. Fertile stems had a spike-like organization, with both lateral and terminal sporangia (spore-forming organs); successive sporangia developed on alternate sides of short stems. The genus was tentatively placed in the "zosterophylls".

A cladogram published in 2004 by Crane et al. places Gumia in a paraphyletic stem group of broadly defined "zosterophylls", basal to the lycopsids (living and extinct clubmosses and relatives).

- lycophytes
  - † Hicklingia
  - - †basal groups
      Adoketophyton, Discalis, Distichophytum (=Rebuchia), Gumuia, Huia, Zosterophyllum myretonianum, Z. llanoveranum, Z. fertile
    - †'core' zosterophylls
      Zosterophyllum divaricatum, Tarella, Oricilla, Gosslingia, Hsua, Thrinkophyton, Protobarinophyton, Barinophyton obscurum, B. citrulliforme, Sawdonia, Deheubarthia, Konioria, Anisophyton, Serrulacaulis, Crenaticaulis
    - - †basal groups
        Nothia, Zosterophyllum deciduum
      - lycopsids
        extant and extinct members

Hao and Xue in 2013 listed the genus as a zosterophyll.
