= Hicklingia =

Hicklingia Temporal range: Middle Devonian

Scientific classification
- Kingdom: Plantae
- Clade: Tracheophytes
- Clade: Lycophytes
- Plesion: †Zosterophylls (?)
- Genus: †Hicklingia; Kidst. & W.H.Lang (1923)

Type species
- Hicklingia edwardii Kidst. & W.H.Lang (1923)

Species
- †Hicklingia edwardii Kidst. & W.H.Lang (1923); †Hicklingia erecta Kräusel & Weyland (1929)

Extinct genus of spore-bearing plants

Hicklingia is a genus of extinct plants of the Middle Devonian (around 393 to 382 million years ago). Compressed specimens were first described in 1923 from the Old Red Sandstone of Scotland. Initially the genus was placed in the "rhyniophytes", but this group is defined as having terminal sporangia (spore-forming organs), and later work showed that the sporangia of Hicklingia were lateral rather than strictly terminal, so that it is now regarded as having affinities with the zosterophylls.

== Description ==
The sporophyte had a tufted growth habit, with narrow leafless stems (axes) up to 17 cm high which branched dichotomously. Sporangia were borne on short stalks (up to 3 mm), on all sides of the stem and also terminally. There are oval scars on specimens where the stalks are presumed to have broken off. The lateral sporangia were closely adpressed to the stem. The effect is of a 'spike' of sporangia which terminates some stems. The sporangia opened via slits, but these did not have the thickened borders which are a feature of some Zosterophyllum species. The vascular system of the stem was not observed. Spores are up to 50 μm in diameter and trilete. The gametophyte is not known.

== Phylogeny ==
The affinity with zosterophylls is recognized in the cladogram published in 2004 by Crane et al. in which Hicklingia is placed as a sister to all the other lycophytes (living and extinct clubmosses and relatives).

- lycophytes
  - † Hicklingia
  - - †basal groups
      Adoketophyton, Discalis, Distichophytum (=Rebuchia), Gumuia, Huia, Zosterophyllum myretonianum, Z. llanoveranum, Z. fertile
    - †'core' zosterophylls
      Zosterophyllum divaricatum, Tarella, Oricilla, Gosslingia, Hsua, Thrinkophyton, Protobarinophyton, Barinophyton obscurum, B. citrulliforme, Sawdonia, Deheubarthia, Konioria, Anisophyton, Serrulacaulis, Crenaticaulis
    - - †basal groups
        Nothia, Zosterophyllum deciduum
      - lycopsids
        extant and extinct members

Hao and Xue in 2013 listed the genus as a zosterophyll.
