= Vernation =

New leaf or frond development in botany

Vernation or leafing is the formation of new leaves or fronds. In plant anatomy, it is the arrangement of leaves in a bud.

== Name ==
The term vernation is borrowed from New Latin vernatio, the act of being verdant or flourishing (vernare). It is cognate with ver (Latin for "spring") and vernalis ("vernal").

== Circinate vernation ==
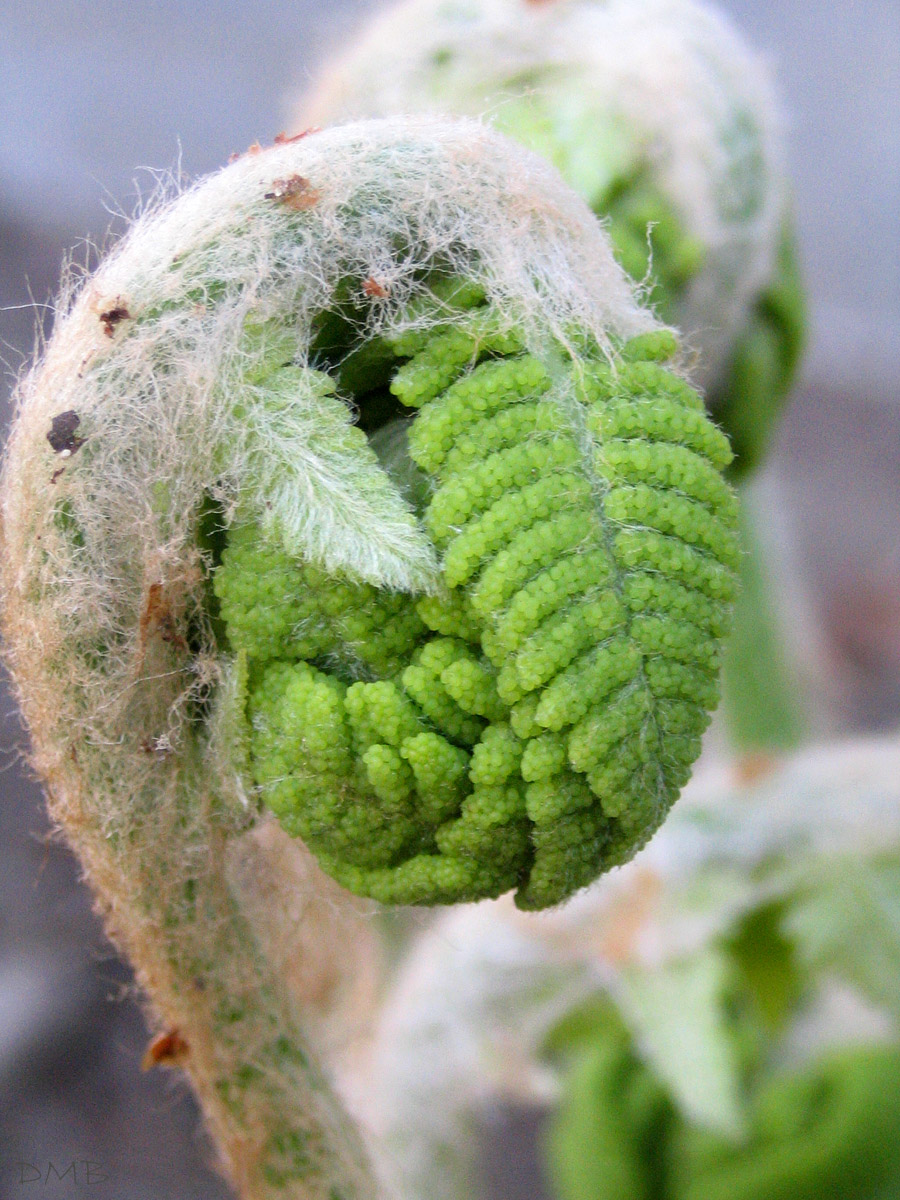
This fern is producing a new frond by circinate vernation.

Circinate vernation (or circinnate, from Latin "made round") is the manner in which most fern fronds emerge. As the fern frond is formed, it is tightly curled so that the tender growing tip of the frond (and each subdivision of the frond) is protected within a coil. At this stage it is called a crozier (after the shepherd's crook) or fiddlehead (after the scrollwork at the top of a violin). As the lower parts of the frond expand and toughen up, they begin to photosynthesize, supporting the further growth and expansion of the frond. By photosynthesizing, the frond increases the amount of solute inside the frond, which lowers the internal water gradient and facilitates an increase in volume that forces uncoiling. In the case of many fronds, long hairs or scales provide additional protection to the growing tips before they are fully uncoiled. Circinate vernation may also be observed in the extension of leaflets, in the compound leaves of cycads. Circinate vernation is also typical of the carnivorous plant family Droseraceae, for example see this photo of Drosera filiformis. It is also seen in the related genera Drosophyllum and Triphyophyllum, and in the much more distantly related Byblis; however in these three genera, the leaves are coiled outwards towards the abaxial surface of the leaf (reverse circinate vernation): this appears to be unique to these three plants among the angiosperms.

== Convolute vernation ==
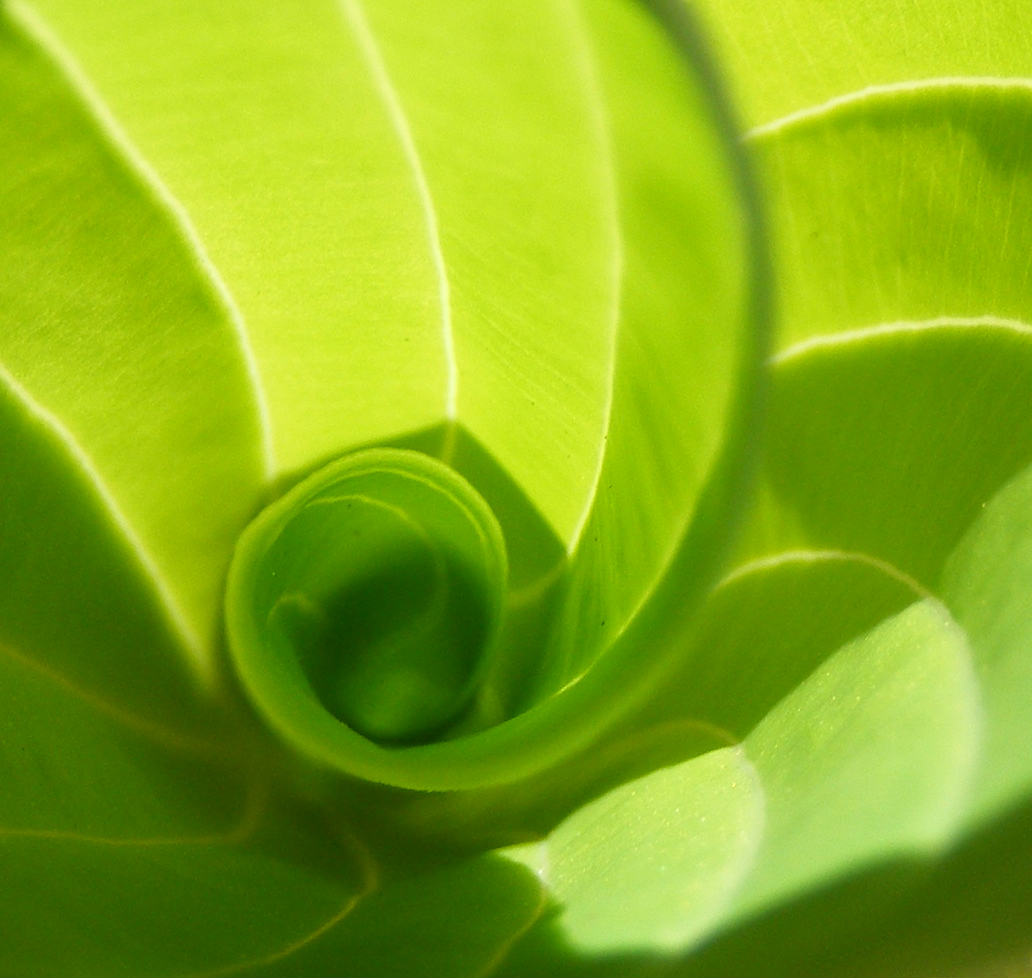
This hosta leaf is produced by convolute vernation.

The process of convolute vernation involves the wrapping of one margin of the leaf's blade over the other. This folding mechanism makes the emerging leaf look like a tube.

== Involute vernation ==
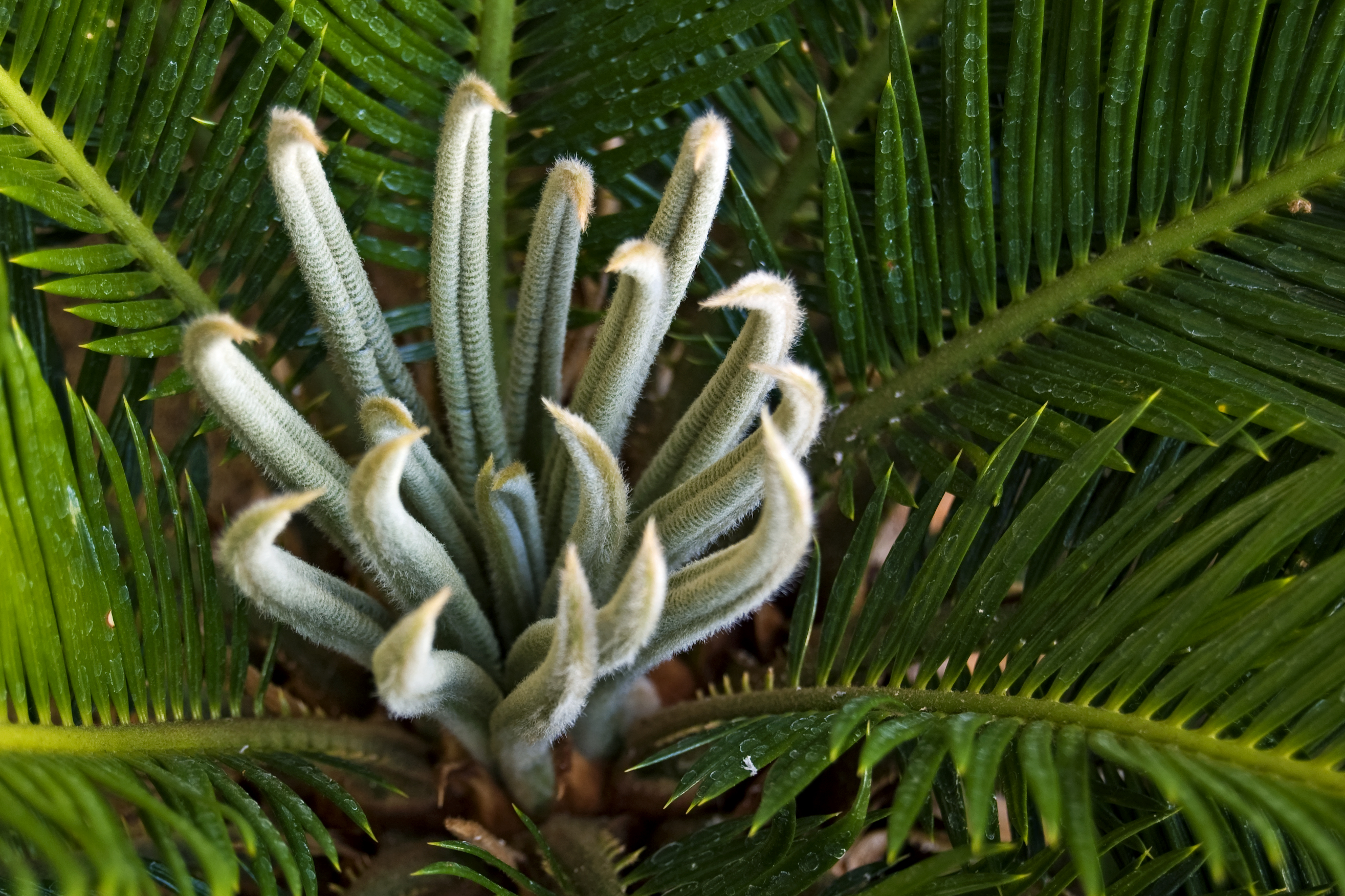
These cycad leaves are produced by involute vernation.

In involute vernation both margins on opposing sides of the leaf are rolled up towards the upper (axial) surface of the leaf, forming two tubes that may meet at the midrib of the leaf.

== Revolute vernation ==
Revolute vernation is the opposite of involute vernation: the margins of the leaf are rolled up towards the under (abaxial) surface of the leaf.

== See also ==
- Aestivation — the way in which the petals and sepals of a flower are arranged in a bud.
- Ptyxis — the way an individual leaf is folded within a bud.
