= Pragian =

Second stage of the Devonian

- 413.02 ± 1.91 – 410.62 ± 1.95 Ma
- Overview of rock field near Homolka hill in Velká Chuchle, Prague, Czech Republic, with a sign marking the stratotype of the Pragian lower boundary

Chronology
← / Hangenberg event, Famennian glaciation; ← / Kellwasser event (Late Devonian mass extinction); ← / Widespread shrubs & trees; ← / Hunsrück fauna; ← / Rhynie chert
Subdivision of the Devonian according to the ICS, as of 2024; Vertical axis scale: Millions of years ago

Etymology
- Name formality: Formal
- Name ratified: 1985

Usage information
- Celestial body: Earth
- Regional usage: Global (ICS)
- Time scale(s) used: ICS Time Scale

Definition
- Chronological unit: Age
- Stratigraphic unit: Stage
- Time span formality: Formal
- Lower boundary definition: FAD of the conodonts Eognathodus sulcatus and Latericriodus steinachensis Morph beta
- Lower boundary GSSP: Velká Chuchle quarry, Prague, Czech Republic; 50.0147°N 14.3726°E
- Lower GSSP ratified: 1989
- Upper boundary definition: FAD of the conodont Polygnathus kitabicus
- Upper boundary GSSP: Zinzil'ban Gorge, Uzbekistan; 39.2000°N 67.3056°E
- Upper GSSP ratified: 1995

The Pragian is one of three faunal stages in the Early Devonian Epoch. It lasted from 413.02 ± 1.91 million years ago to 410.62 ± 1.95 million years ago. It was preceded by the Lochkovian Stage and followed by the Emsian Stage. The most important Lagerstätte of the Pragian is Rhynie chert in Scotland. It is named after the city of Prague. The GSSP is located within the Prague Formation at Velká Chuchle, Prague.

In North America the Pragian Stage is represented by Siegenian or Deerparkian time.

== Pragian life ==
The first ammonoids (order Agoniatitida) appeared in later parts of this stage (at the lower boundary of the Zlichovian stage as it was known in Siberian representations). They were descended from bactritoid nautiloid ancestors, which also appeared in this stage before experiencing evolutionary radiations in the next stage.
