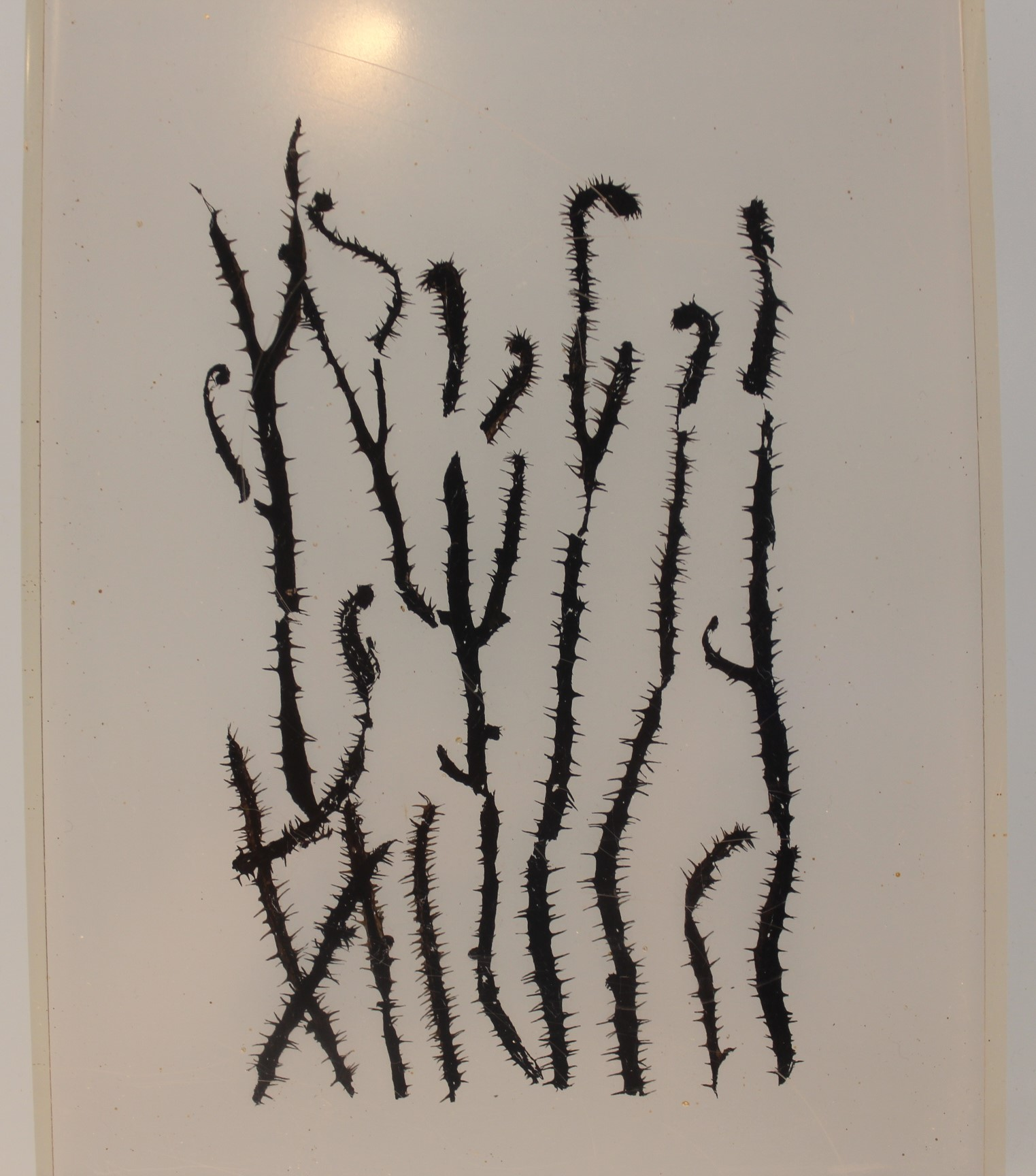
- Acid-prepared fossils of Sawdonia ornata (USNM 267242)

Scientific classification
- Kingdom: Plantae
- Clade: Tracheophytes
- Clade: Lycophytes
- Plesion: †Zosterophylls
- Genus: †Sawdonia; Hueber (1971)

Species
- †Sawdonia ornata; †Sawdonia acanthotheca

= Sawdonia =

Sawdonia Temporal range: Upper Silurian–Lower Carboniferous

Extinct genus of spore-bearing plants

Sawdonia is an extinct genus of early vascular plants, known from the Upper Silurian to the Lower Carboniferous (430 to 320 million years ago). Sawdonia is best recognized by the large number of spikes (enations) covering the plant. These are vascular plants that do not have vascular systems in their enations. The first species of this genus (Sawdonia ornata) was described in 1859 by Sir J. William Dawson and, was originally attributed to the genus Psilophyton. He named this plant Psilophyton princeps. In 1971 Francis Hueber proposed a new genus for this species due to its "Divergent technical characters from the generic description for Psilophyton." The holotype used for description is Dawson Collection Number 48, pro parte, Museum Specimen Number 3243. (See Dawson 1871, Plate IX, fig 101.) Sir J. William Dawson Collection, Peter Redpath Museum, McGill University, Montreal, Quebec, Canada.

== Morphology ==
These plants are described by Hueber as having monopodially branched stems, that are unridged, spinous and circinately tipped. The sporangia are described as round in abaxial view, and oval in lateral view. These sporangia are formed laterally and singular on short stalks. The sporangium split along convex margins into equal valves in a trilete fashion. The spines are tapered and pointed lower on the plant but form loose spikes at end of the plant. The xylem are just one solid strand. The epidermal cells have cuticular papillae. There are stomata located on the on stem but not on spine surfaces.

Sawdonia is defined by Francis Hueber in his 1971 paper as follows:

1. Having stems up to 5 mm in diameter without measuring the spikes
2. Multi cellular spines measuring 0.5-1.8 mm at the base, reaching 0.5-3.9mm long, with a density range of 4 to 45 per cm of stem
3. Sporangia: 3-3.5 mm in diameter, with stalks 0.5-0.75 mm long and 1-1.25 mm wide
4. A present Vascular strand
5. Spores: round to sub-triangular, 54-64 um, trilete simple structure
6. An oval xylem strand when viewed in cross section .074x0.34 mm in diameter
7. Trachieds that have a helical scalariform
8. Stomata 39-72 um long, 17-34 um wide, with parallel elongation in regards to the axis of the stem, with a thickened outer wall of guard cells
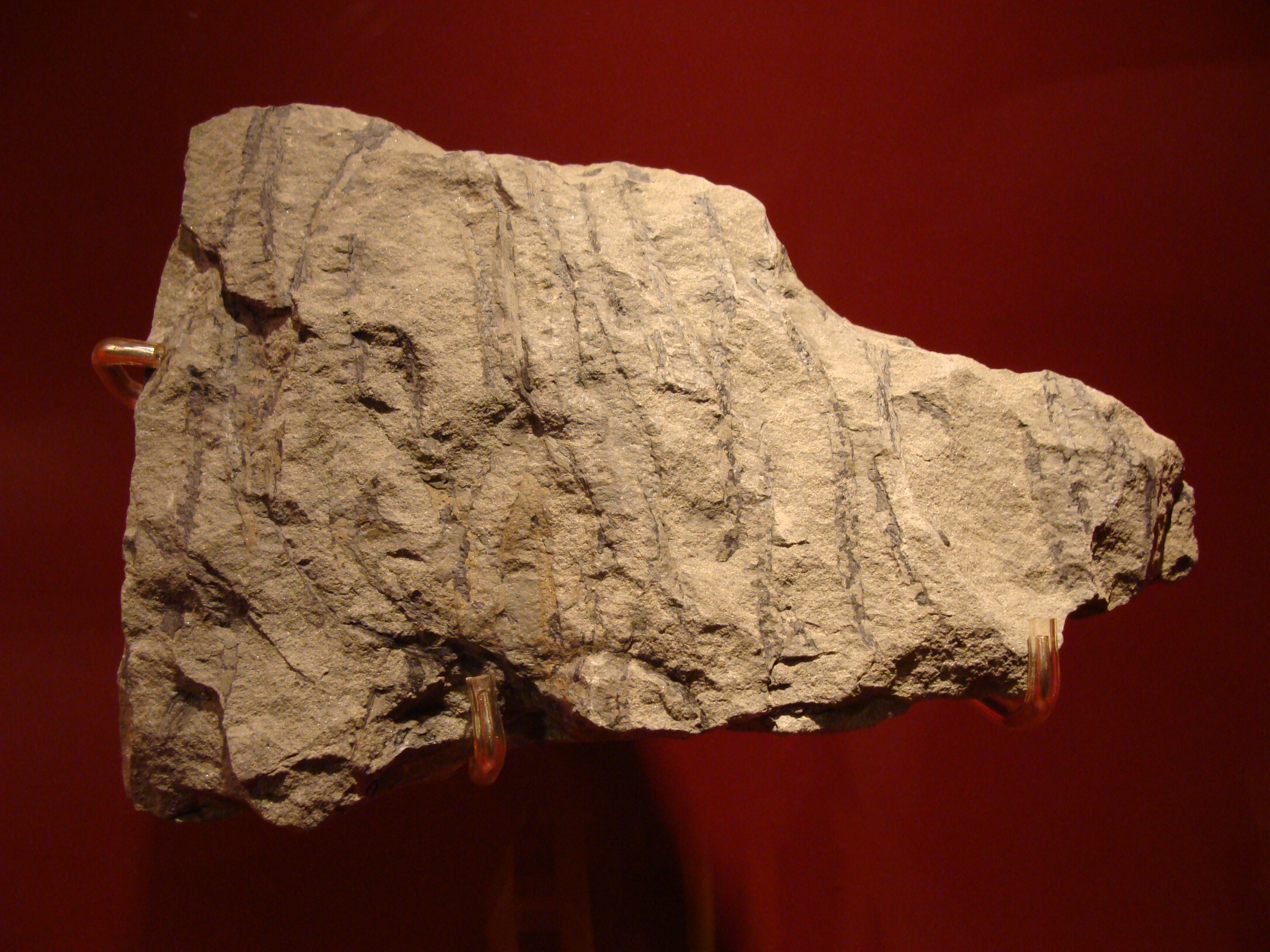
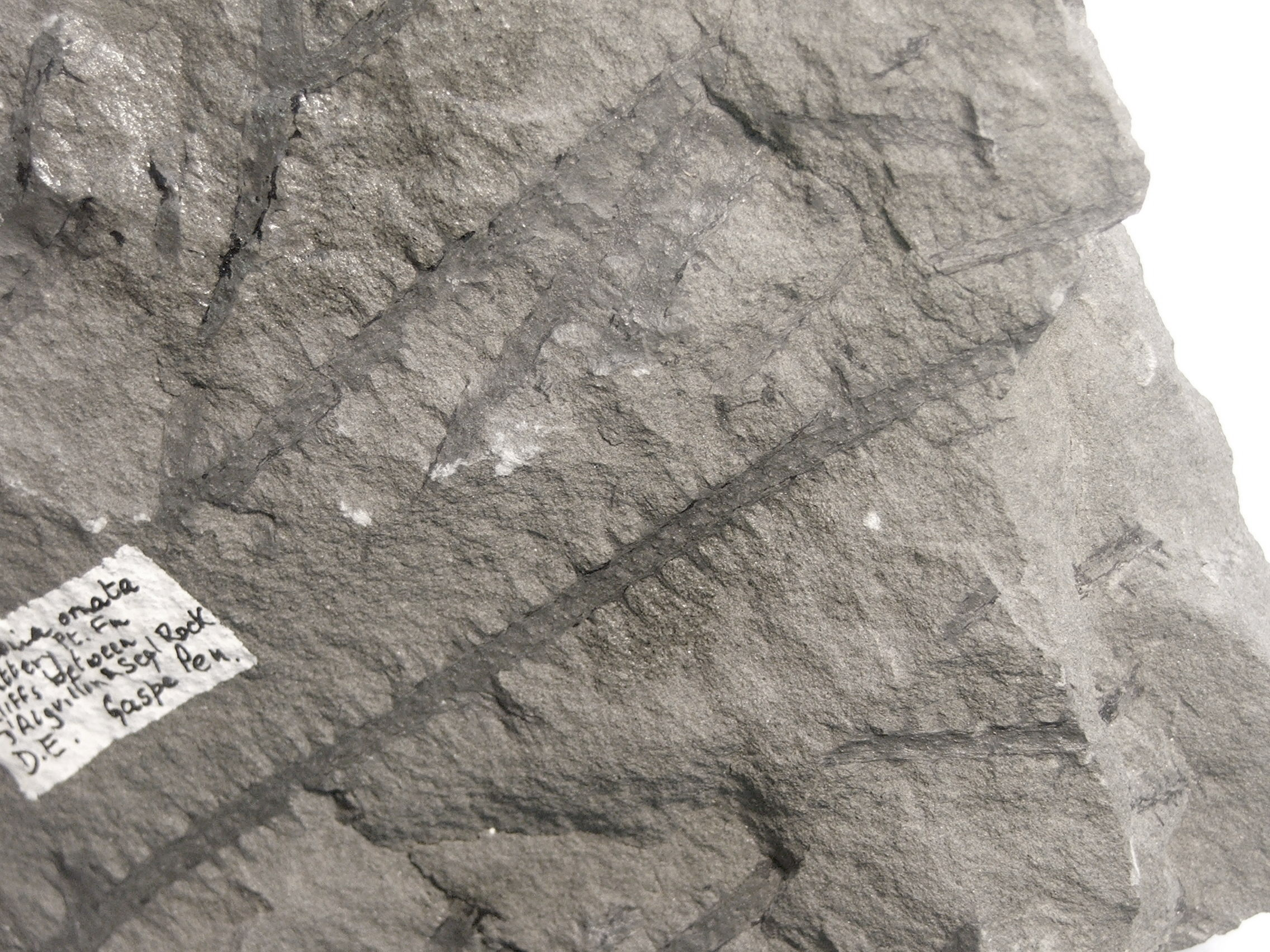
Sawdonia ornata fossils from Gaspé, Quebec

== Taxonomy ==
=== Classification ===
There is agreement that Sawdonia was a zosterophyll – a group of plants on the line of evolution leading to the modern lycopodiopsids. In their 1997 cladistic study, Kenrick and Crane placed Sawdonia in the family Sawdoniaceae, order Sawdoniales. An alternative view places the genus in the family Gosslingiaceae, order Gosslingiales.

=== Species ===
- Sawdonia ornata
- Sawdonia acanthotheca
- Sawdonia curstipa (disputed)

== Range ==
Sawdonia had an extremely broad range, with many specimens found in Canada (Battery Point Formation), Venezuela (Campo Chico Formation), England and Scotland (Strathmore Group). There have even been a species that has been found across China, that might fall under the Sawdonia genus.
