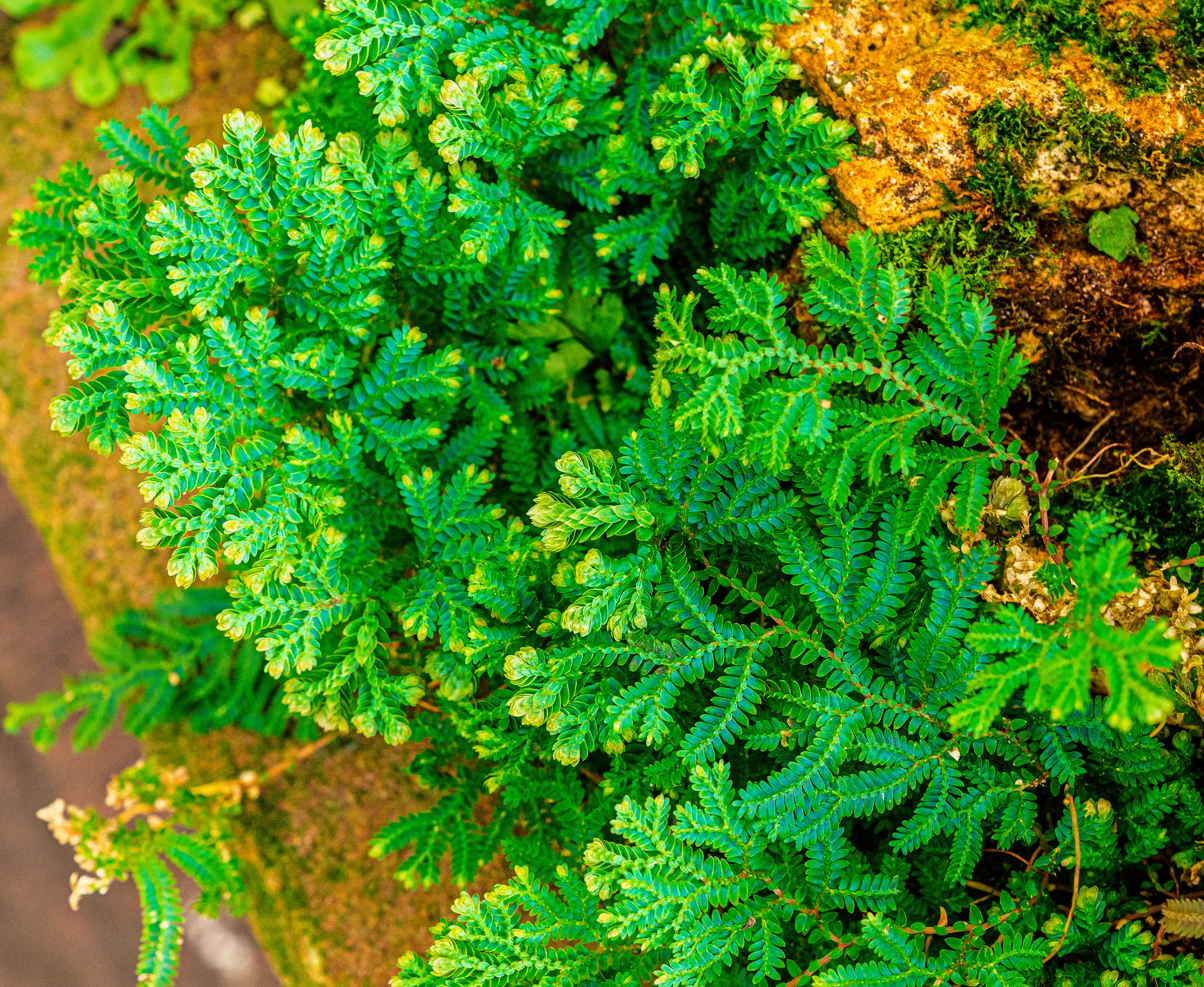
- Blue spikemoss, a non-seed-bearing plant, Lycopodiophyta
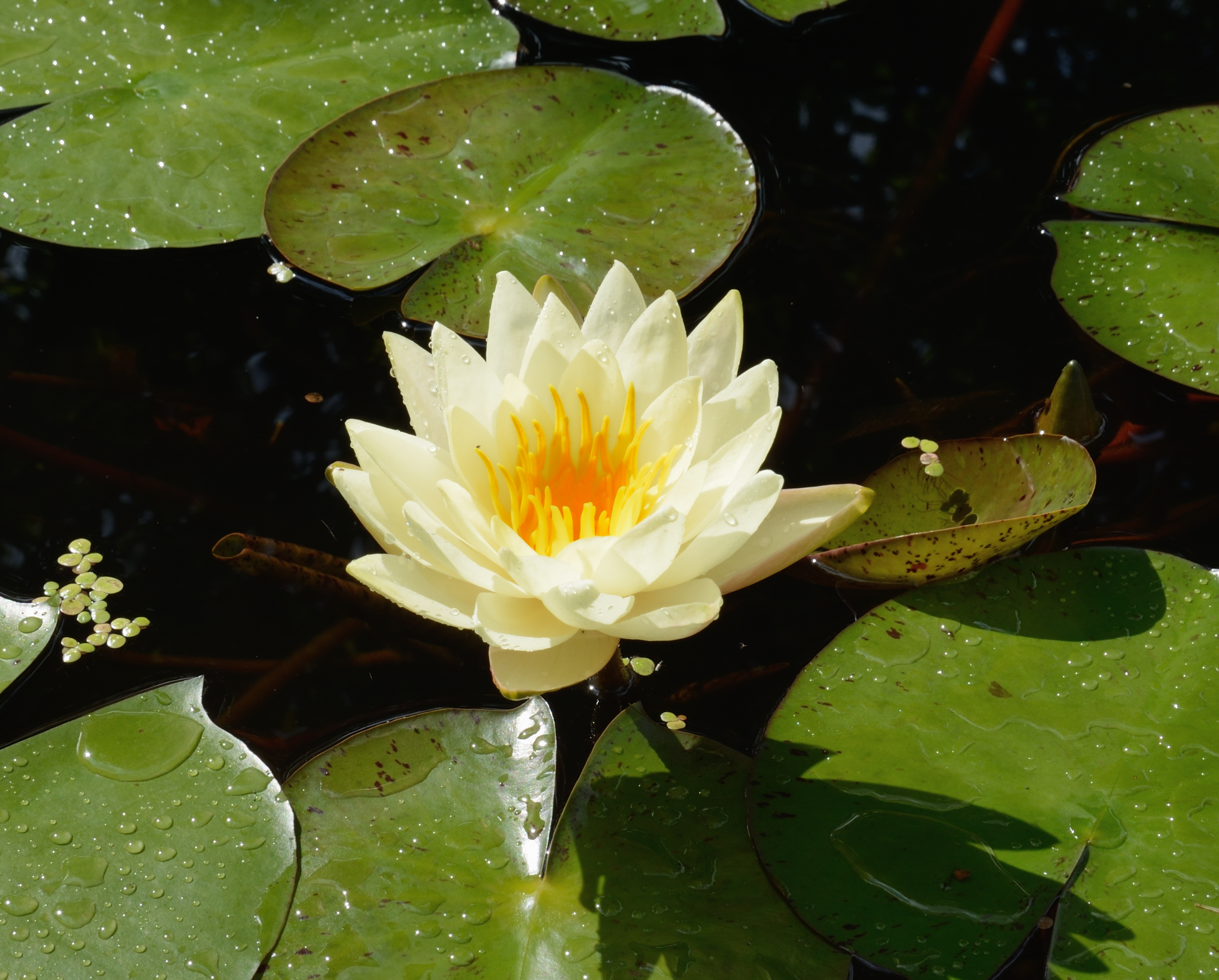
- Nymphaea alba, a seed-bearing plant, Euphyllophytina

Scientific classification
- Kingdom: Plantae
- Clade: Embryophytes
- Clade: Polysporangiophytes
- Clade: Tracheophytes

Divisions † Extinct
- †Cooksonia; †Rhyniophyta; †Zosterophyllophyta; Lycopodiophyta; Euphyllophytina; †Trimerophytophyta; Polypodiophyta; †Progymnospermophyta; Superdivision Spermatophyta; †Pteridospermatophyta; Pinophyta; Cycadophyta; Ginkgophyta; Gnetophyta; Magnoliophyta (angiosperms); †Bennettitales

= Vascular plant =

Vascular plant Temporal range: Silurian–Present, 425–0 Ma Possible Ordovician records

Clade of plants with xylem and phloem

Vascular plants (from Latin vasculum 'duct'), also called tracheophytes (UK: /ˈtrækiːəˌfaɪts/, US: /ˈtreɪkiːəˌfaɪts/) or collectively Tracheophyta (/ˌtreɪkiːˈɒfɪtə/; from Ancient Greek τραχεῖα ἀρτηρία (trakheîa artēría) 'windpipe' and φυτά (phutá) 'plants'), are plants that have lignified tissues (the xylem) for conducting water and minerals throughout the plant. They also have a specialized non-lignified tissue (the phloem) to conduct products of photosynthesis. The group includes most land plants (c. 300,000 accepted known species) excluding mosses.

Vascular plants include the clubmosses, horsetails, ferns, gymnosperms (including conifers), and angiosperms (flowering plants). They are contrasted with nonvascular plants such as mosses and green algae. Scientific names for the vascular plants group include Tracheophyta, Tracheobionta and Equisetopsida sensu lato. Some early land plants (the rhyniophytes) had less developed vascular tissue; the term eutracheophyte has been used for all other vascular plants, including all living ones.

Historically, vascular plants were known as "higher plants", as it was believed that they were further evolved than other plants due to being more complex organisms. However, this is an antiquated remnant of the obsolete scala naturae, and the term is generally considered to be unscientific.

The earliest known definite tracheophytes, such as Cooksonia, appeared in the mid-Silurian. However, two Sandbian plants from Russia, Piterophyton and Volkhoviella, have also been treated as tracheophytes (more specifically rhyniophytes)

== Characteristics ==
Botanists define vascular plants by three primary characteristics:

1. Vascular plants have vascular tissues which distribute resources through the plant. Two kinds of vascular tissue occur in plants: xylem and phloem. Phloem and xylem are closely associated with one another and are typically located immediately adjacent to each other in the plant. The combination of one xylem and one phloem strand adjacent to each other is known as a vascular bundle. The evolution of vascular tissue in plants allowed them to evolve to larger sizes than non-vascular plants, which lack these specialized conducting tissues and are thereby restricted to relatively small sizes.
2. In vascular plants, the principal generation or phase is the sporophyte, which produces spores and is diploid (having two sets of chromosomes per cell). (By contrast, the principal generation phase in non-vascular plants is the gametophyte, which produces gametes and is haploid, with one set of chromosomes per cell.)
3. Vascular plants have true roots, leaves, and stems, even if some groups have secondarily lost one or more of these traits.

Cavalier-Smith (1998) treated the Tracheophyta as a phylum or botanical division encompassing two of these characteristics defined by the Latin phrase "facies diploida xylem et phloem instructa" (diploid phase with xylem and phloem).

One possible mechanism for the presumed evolution from emphasis on haploid generation to emphasis on diploid generation is the greater efficiency in spore dispersal with more complex diploid structures. Elaboration of the spore stalk enabled the production of more spores and the development of the ability to release them higher and to broadcast them further. Such developments may include more photosynthetic area for the spore-bearing structure, the ability to grow independent roots, woody structure for support, and more branching.

Sexual reproduction in vascular land plants involves the process of meiosis. Meiosis provides a direct DNA repair capability for dealing with DNA damages, including oxidative DNA damages, in germline reproductive tissues.

== Phylogeny ==
A proposed phylogeny of the vascular plants after Kenrick and Crane 1997 is as follows, with modification to the gymnosperms from Christenhusz et al. (2011a), Pteridophyta from Smith et al. and lycophytes and ferns by Christenhusz et al. (2011b) The cladogram distinguishes the rhyniophytes from the "true" tracheophytes, the eutracheophytes.

- Polysporangiates
  - †Aglaophyton
  - †Horneophytopsida
  - - Tracheophyta
      - †Rhyniophyta
      - Eutracheophytes
        - Lycophytina
          - Lycopodiophyta
          - †Zosterophyllophyta
        - Euphyllophytina
          - Pteridophyta
            - - †Cladoxylopsida
              - Equisetopsida (horsetails)
              - Marattiopsida
              - Psilotopsida (whisk ferns and adders'-tongues)
              - Pteridopsida (true ferns)
          - Lignophytes
            - †Progymnospermophyta
            - Spermatophytes
              - Cycadophyta (cycads)
              - Ginkgophyta (ginkgo)
              - Gnetophyta
              - Pinophyta (conifers)
              - Magnoliophyta (flowering plants)
              - †Pteridospermatophyta (seed ferns)

This phylogeny is supported by several molecular studies. Other researchers state that taking fossils into account leads to different conclusions, for example that the ferns (Pteridophyta) are not monophyletic.

Hao and Xue presented an alternative phylogeny in 2013 for pre-euphyllophyte plants.

- Polysporangiophytes
  - †Horneophytaceae
  - Tracheophytes
    - †Cooksoniaceae
    - - †Aglaophyton
      - - †Rhyniopsida
        - - †Catenalis
          - - †Aberlemnia
            - - †Hsuaceae
              - - †Renaliaceae
                - Eutracheophytes
                  - - †Adoketophyton
                    - †?Barinophytopsida
                    - †Zosterophyllopsida
                  - - Microphylls
                      - †Hicklingia
                      - - †Gumuia
                        - - †Nothia
                          - - Lycopodiopsida
                            - †Zosterophyllum deciduum
                    - - †Yunia
                      - Euphyllophytes
                        - †Eophyllophyton
                        - - †Trimerophytopsida
                          - Megaphylls
                            - Moniliformopses
                              - †Ibyka
                              - - †Pauthecophyton
                                - - †Cladoxylopsida
                                  - Polypodiopsida
                            - Radiatopses
                              - †Celatheca
                              - - †Pertica
                                - Lignophytes
                                  - †Progymnosperms
                                    (paraphyletic)
                                  - Spermatophytes

== Nutrient distribution ==
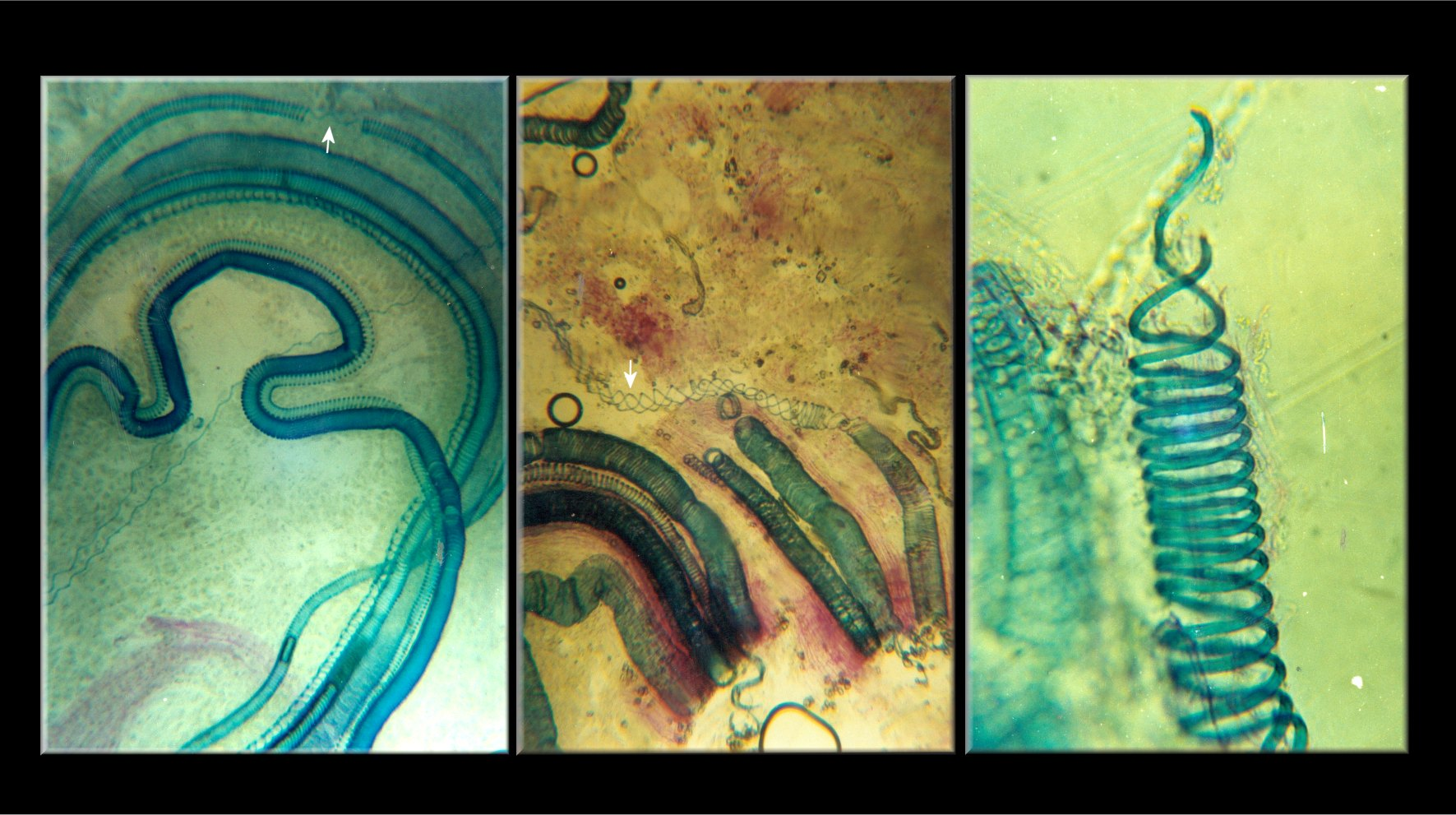
Xylem elements in the shoot of a fig tree (Ficus alba), crushed in hydrochloric acid

Water and nutrients in the form of inorganic solutes are drawn up from the soil by the roots and transported throughout the plant by the xylem. Organic compounds such as sucrose produced by photosynthesis in leaves are distributed by the phloem sieve-tube elements.

The xylem consists of vessels in flowering plants and of tracheids in other vascular plants. Xylem cells are dead, hard-walled hollow cells arranged to form files of tubes that function in water transport. A tracheid cell wall usually contains the polymer lignin.

The phloem, on the other hand, consists of living cells called sieve-tube members. Between the sieve-tube members are sieve plates, which have pores to allow molecules to pass through. Sieve-tube members lack such organs as nuclei or ribosomes, but cells next to them, the companion cells, function to keep the sieve-tube members alive.

=== Transpiration ===
The most abundant compound in all plants, as in all cellular organisms, is water, which has an important structural role and a vital role in plant metabolism. Transpiration is the main process of water movement within plant tissues. Plants constantly transpire water through their stomata to the atmosphere and replace that water with soil moisture taken up by their roots. When the stomata are closed at night, water pressure can build up in the plant. Excess water is excreted through pores known as hydathodes. The movement of water out of the leaf stomata sets up transpiration pull or tension in the water column in the xylem vessels or tracheids. The pull is the result of water surface tension within the cell walls of the mesophyll cells, from the surfaces of which evaporation takes place when the stomata are open. Hydrogen bonds exist between water molecules, causing them to line up; as the molecules at the top of the plant evaporate, each pulls the next one up to replace it, which in turn pulls on the next one in line. The draw of water upwards may be entirely passive and can be assisted by the movement of water into the roots via osmosis. Consequently, transpiration requires the plant to expend very little energy on water movement. Transpiration assists the plant in absorbing nutrients from the soil as soluble salts. Transpiration plays an important role in the absorption of nutrients from the soil as soluble salts are transported along with the water from the soil to the leaves. Plants can adjust their transpiration rate to optimize the balance between water loss and nutrient absorption.

=== Absorption ===
Living root cells passively absorb water. Pressure within the root increases when transpiration demand via osmosis is low and decreases when water demand is high. No water movement towards the shoots and leaves occurs when evapotranspiration is absent. This condition is associated with high temperature, high humidity, darkness, and drought.

=== Conduction ===
Xylem is the water-conducting tissue, and the secondary xylem provides the raw material for the forest products industry. Xylem and phloem tissues each play a part in the conduction processes within plants. Sugars are conveyed throughout the plant in the phloem; water and other nutrients pass through the xylem. Conduction occurs from a source to a sink for each separate nutrient. Sugars are produced in the leaves (a source) by photosynthesis and transported to the growing shoots and roots (sinks) for use in growth, cellular respiration or storage. Minerals are absorbed in the roots (a source) and transported to the shoots to allow cell division and growth.

== See also ==
- Fern allies
- Bryophytes
- Non-vascular plant
- Pteridophyte

== Bibliography ==
- Cracraft, Joel; Donoghue, Michael J., eds. (2004). Assembling the Tree of Life. Oxford University Press. ISBN 978-0-19-972960-9.
- Cantino, Philip D.; Doyle, James A.; Graham, Sean W.; Judd, Walter S.; Olmstead, Richard G.; Soltis, Douglas E.; Soltis, Pamela S.; Donoghue, Michael J. (1 August 2007). "Towards a Phylogenetic Nomenclature of Tracheophyta". Taxon. 56 (3): 822. doi:10.2307/25065865. JSTOR 25065865.
- Kenrick, P. (29 June 2000). "The relationships of vascular plants". Philosophical Transactions of the Royal Society B: Biological Sciences. 355 (1398): 847–855. doi:10.1098/rstb.2000.0619. PMC 1692788. PMID 10905613.
- Pryer, Kathleen M.; Schneider, Harald; Magallon, Susana (13 November 2017). The radiation of vascular plants (PDF). pp. 138–153., in Cracraft & Donoghue (2004)
