= Junggaria =

Junggaria Temporal range: Late Late Silurian

Scientific classification
- Kingdom: Plantae
- Clade: Polysporangiophytes
- Clade: Tracheophytes
- Stem group: †Rhyniophytes
- Genus: †Junggaria; Y.-W. Dou

Species
- J. spinosa Y.-W. Dou

Synonyms
- ?Cooksonella M.S. Senkevich nom. illeg.

Extinct genus of land plants

Junggaria was a genus of rhyniophyte-like land plants known from fossils found in China in Upper Silurian strata (Přídolí, around 430 to 420 million years ago). It bore leafless dichotomously or pseudomonopodially branching axes, some of which ended in spore-forming organs or sporangia of complex shape. The genus Cooksonella, found in Kazakhstan from deposits of a similar age, is considered to be an illegitimate synonym.

== Description ==
Junggaria spinosa was first described as a new species by Dou in 1983, from four fossil specimens found in the Wutubulake Formation, Xinjiang, China, now dated to the Late Silurian (Přídolí, around 430 to 420 million years ago). Further specimens were found later and a more detailed description was published in 1993 by Cai et al.

The specimens are fragmentary so that a full reconstruction is difficult. It appears that the sporophyte of Junggaria spinosa had 'pseudomonopodial' branching, i.e. the leafless stems (axes) divided into two branches in such a way that one continued as the 'main' stem and the other became a side or lateral branch. Lateral branches divided dichotomously up to twice, terminating in spore-forming organs or sporangia. Stems varied in width from around 1.1 mm to 2.5 mm. Most of the stems were smooth but some bore hair-like structures up to 0.1 mm in diameter and 0.5 mm long. A darker central strand was observed on some stems, but the internal structure is not known.

Schematic representation of two sporangia of Junggaria spinosa as they appear in fossil specimens. Based on Fig. 6 in Cai, Dou & Edwards (1993). Scale bar is 1 mm.

In the flattened fossils, the sporangia consist of a central, roughly circular area, on average 2 mm in diameter, smoothly connected to the end of the stem on which they were borne. Around the top and sides of the central area there is a border, around 1 mm wide, which is not connected to the stem and ends abruptly. The border varies in shape, sometimes being uniform, sometimes lobed; it appears to consist of two layers separated by a 'filling'. The layers appear separated into two 'valves' in some specimens. Cai et al. say that it is difficult to reconstruct the three-dimensional structure of a sporangium before preservation; it may have been more-or-less spherical or it may already have been compressed from side to side before being fossilized. They concluded that "[t]hese unique and somewhat bizarre sporangia ... defy our understanding", but that the most surprising feature was their complexity relative to other Silurian species such as Salopella, Cooksonia or Steganotheca.

== Relationship with Cooksonella ==
The new genus and species Cooksonella sphaerica nom. illeg. was created by Senkevich in 1978 for plants found in Kazakhstan. The sediments in which the fossils were found are now also regarded as from the Přídolí. The description of C. sphaerica is considered by Cai et al. to be sufficiently similar to the Chinese specimens to regard them as the same species. The different preservation of the Kazakhstan specimens allowed the presence of a central strand of tracheids to be demonstrated, showing that C. sphaerica is a vascular plant.

Senkevich's name is illegitimate, because the genus name Cooksonella had already been used for a different fossil. Hence Cai et al. were unable to rename Dou's Junggaria spinosa as Cooksonella sphaerica. A new genus name is required under the International Code of Botanical Nomenclature, but as of April 2011 does not appear to have been created, so that forms such as "Cooksonella sphaerica/Junggaria spinosa" will be found in the literature.

== Phylogeny ==
Junggaria has some affinities with the rhyniophytes in that it has leafless dichotomizing stems with terminal sporangia and appears to have xylem. Rhyniophytes or paratracheophytes are part of the group from which the true vascular plants or tracheophytes are believed to have evolved. However, features of the sporangium led Cai et al. to make comparisons with genera such as Renalia, Sartilmania and some species of Cooksonia. These have been placed within the tracheophytes, basal to lycophytes (modern clubmosses and allies). The relationships of Junggaria/Cooksonella remain uncertain.
