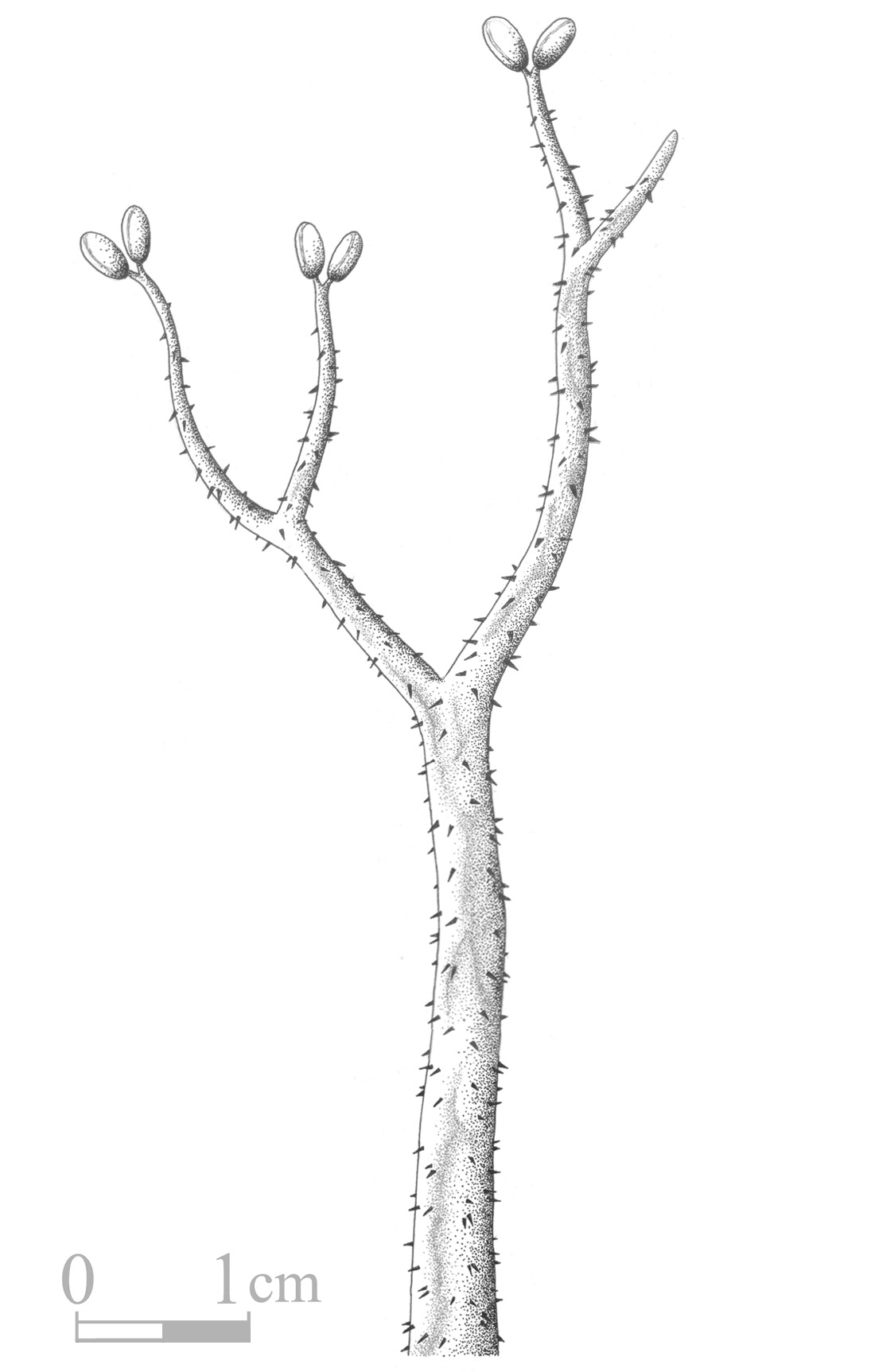
- Reconstruction of Yunia dichotoma according to its description.

Scientific classification
- Kingdom: Plantae
- Clade: Tracheophytes
- Clade: Lycophytes
- Plesion: †Zosterophylls (?)
- Genus: †Yunia; S.G.Hao & C.B.Beck (1991)

Type species
- Yunia dichotoma S.G.Hao & C.B.Beck (1991)

Species
- †Yunia dichotoma S.G.Hao & C.B.Beck (1991); †Yunia guangnania S.G.Hao & Xue (2013)

= Yunia =

Yunia Temporal range: Early Devonian

Extinct genus of spore-bearing plants

Yunia is a genus of extinct vascular plants from the Early Devonian (Pragian or Siegenian stage, around 413 to 411 million years ago). It was first described from the Posongchong Formation of Yunnan, China. The leafless plant consisted of spiny stems, some 2 to 5 cm (0.79 to 1.97 in) wide, which branched dichotomously at wide angles in a cruciate arrangement. Each stem contained vascular tissue with one or two strands of protoxylem. The spore-forming organs (sporangia) were elongated and borne on short stalks. The spores had a relatively smooth sculptural pattern and were trilete (i.e. each spore has three lines on it resulting from its formation in a tetrahedral set of four spores).

In 2004, Crane et al. published a simplified cladogram for the polysporangiophytes in which Yunia is basal to the lycophytes (clubmosses and relatives). It had previously been placed in the "trimerophytes" (a group now thought to be paraphyletic), which were considered to have given rise to all the other vascular plants except the lycophytes.

- tracheophytes
  - † Rhyniaceae (Huvenia, Rhynia, Stockmansella)
  - - † basal groups (Aberlemnia caledonica [=Cooksonia caledonica], Cooksonia pertoni)
    - - † basal groups
        Cooksonia cambrensis, Renalia, Sartilmania, Uskiella, Yunia
      - lycophytes
    - euphyllophytes

Hao and Xue in 2013 considered the genus as a questionable zosterophyll.
