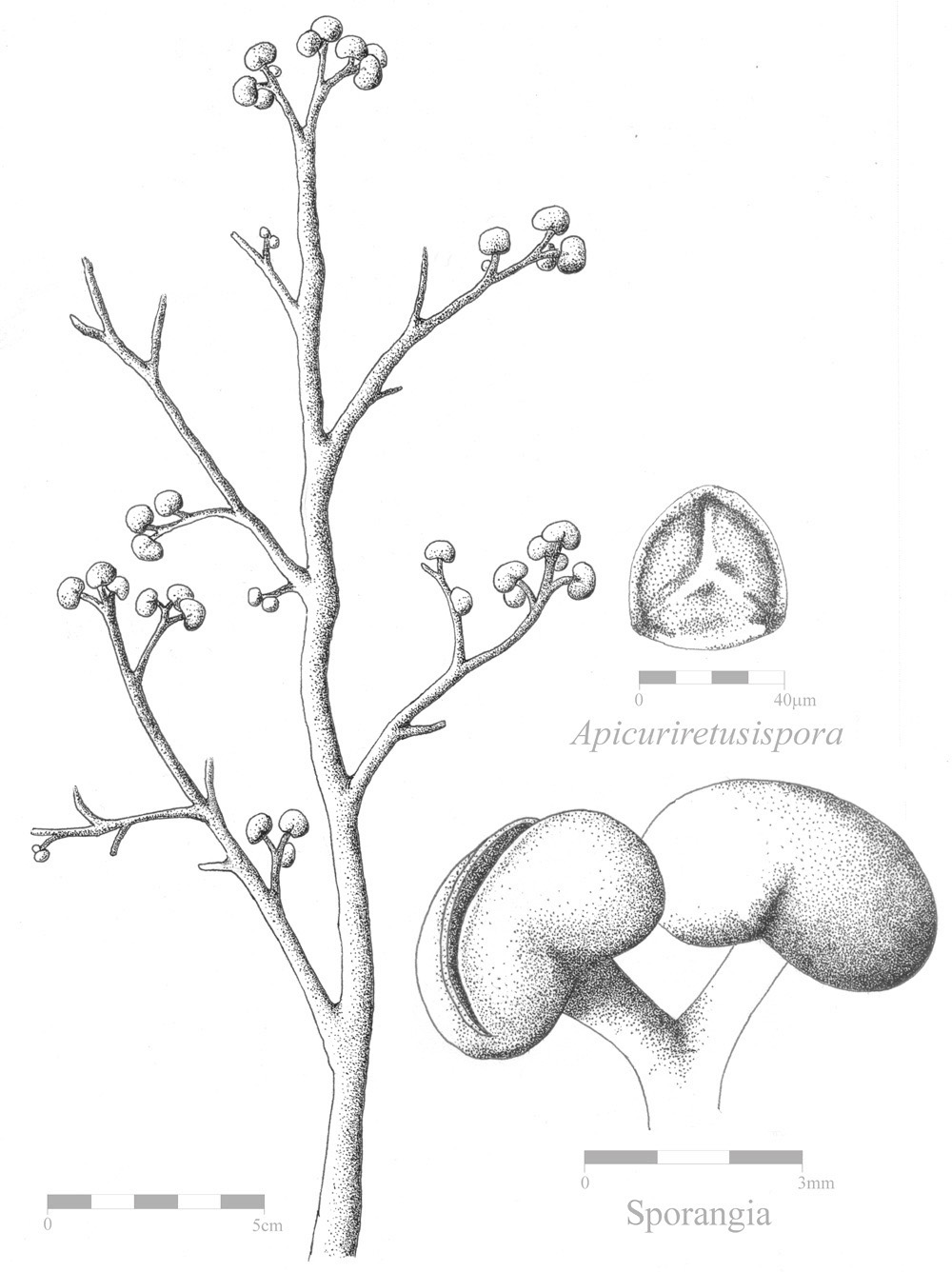

Scientific classification
- Kingdom: Plantae
- Clade: Embryophytes
- Clade: Polysporangiophytes
- Clade: Tracheophyta
- Genus: †Renalia; Gensel (1976)

Type species
- Renalia hueberi Gensel (1976)

Species
- †R. grabertii Schweitzer (1980); †R. hueberi Gensel (1976); †R. major Schweitzer (1980)

= Renalia =

Renalia Temporal range: Early Devonian

Extinct genus of vascular plants

Renalia is a genus of extinct vascular plants from the Early Devonian (around 420 to 390 million years ago). It was first described in 1976 from compressed fossils in the Battery Point Formation (Gaspé, Québec, Canada). It is difficult to reconstruct the original form of the complete plant, but it appears to have consisted of leafless branching stems whose side branches had sporangia (spore-forming organs) at their tips. It is regarded as an early relative of the lycophytes (clubmosses and relatives).

== Description ==
The species R. hueberi was described by Patricia G. Gensel in 1976 from compressed fossils. As with all compressions, it is difficult to reconstruct the entire plant, but the sporophyte is thought to have been about 30 cm tall, with bare stems (axes) up to 1.5 mm wide. The main stem had lateral branches which divided into two equal branches (dichotomized) several times. Tracheids (specialized cells serving the purpose of water transport) were present in the stems. The rounded to reniform (kidney-shaped) sporangia (spore-forming organs) were born at the tips of the lateral branches and dehisced (split) along the distal margin into two equal parts. The spores were trilete (multiple spores shared a common origin, and were in contact with each other).

Two further species, R. grabertii and R. major were described later by Schweitzer. The sporangia are similarly reniform, differing in their placement. In R. major, they are inserted laterally on the stem on small stalks, too short to be called branches.

== Phylogeny ==
The absence of leaves, the presence of vascular tissue, the terminal position of the sporangia and the form of the branching of the stems (pseudomonopodial) suggest a relationship with the Rhyniaceae; however, the shape of the sporangia and the form of their dehiscence suggest a relationship with the lycophytes. Hence the position of the genus in the cladogram for the polysporangiophytes which Crane et al. published in 2004; Renalia is placed basal to the lycophytes (clubmosses and relatives).

- tracheophytes
  - † Rhyniaceae (Huvenia, Rhynia, Stockmansella)
  - - † basal groups (Aberlemnia caledonica [=Cooksonia caledonica], Cooksonia pertoni)
    - - † basal groups
        Cooksonia cambrensis, Renalia, Sartilmania, Uskiella, Yunia
      - lycophytes
    - euphyllophytes
