= Sartilmania =

Sartilmania Temporal range: Early Devonian

Scientific classification
- Kingdom: Plantae
- Clade: Tracheophytes
- Stem group: †Rhyniophytes (?)
- Genus: †Sartilmania; Fairon-Dem. (1986)

Species
- †S. jabachensis (Kräusel & Weyland) Fairon-Dem.

Extinct genus of vascular plants

Sartilmania is a genus of extinct vascular plants of the Early Devonian (Emsian stage, around 410 to 390 million years ago). Fossils were found on the Sart Tilman campus of the University of Liège, Belgium (after which the genus was named).

== Description ==
The sporophyte of Sartilmania jabachensis has narrow leafless stems (axes), from 0.75 mm to a maximum of 2 mm in diameter, marked with irregular longitudinal striations, which allows them to be distinguished from the stems of Stockmansella langii, with which they are mixed in the deposit. The plant is heavily and irregularly branched, with the lateral branches being arranged spirally. Each lateral branch appears to have ended in a vertically oriented sporangium, which caused a sharp upwards turn if the branch it terminated was near to the horizontal. The sporangia were spatulate (spoon-shaped), most measuring 3.5–4 mm long by 2.5-3.5 mm wide, marked by the same longitudinal striations as were present on the stems. The sporangia opened into two valves along their distal margins. Spores were not found; nor was the vascular system of the stems observed. The gametophyte is not known.

== Taxonomy ==
Fairon-Demaret investigated fossils from Sart-Tilman (Liège, Belgium), and discovered that some specimens were identical to those previously called Dawsonites jabachensis. However details of the shape of the sporangia (spore-forming organs) were inconsistent with the definition of the form genus Dawsonites, so Fairon-Demaret transferred the species to a new genus, Sartilmania.

== Phylogeny ==
Sartilmania has similarities with the genus Renalia. However, the way in which the sporangia of Sartilmania turn upwards and their spatulate rather than reniform (kidney-like) shape distinguish the two genera. In 2004, Crane et al. published a cladogram for the polysporangiophytes, in which Sartilmania, like Renalia, is placed basal to the lycophytes (clubmosses and relatives).

- tracheophytes
  - † Rhyniaceae (Huvenia, Rhynia, Stockmansella)
  - - † basal groups (Aberlemnia caledonica [=Cooksonia caledonica], Cooksonia pertoni)
    - - † basal groups
        Cooksonia cambrensis, Renalia, Sartilmania, Uskiella, Yunia
      - lycophytes
    - euphyllophytes

Hao and Xue in 2013 listed the genus as a rhyniophyte.
