= Culullitheca =

Culullitheca Temporal range: Early Devonian

Scientific classification
- Kingdom: Plantae
- Clade: Tracheophytes
- Stem group: †Rhyniophytes
- Form taxon: †Cooksonioidea
- Genus: †Culullitheca; Wellman et al. 1998

Plant genus

Culullitheca was a genus of land plant with branching axes. It is known from charcoalified Early Devonian deposits, its type locality being the Brown Clee Hill lagerstätten. Its spores formed permanent dyads.
