= Stomatophyta =

Proposed taxonomic branch of the liverworts

The Stomatophyta are a proposed sister branch of the Marchantiophyta (Liverworts), together forming the Embryophyta. The Stomatophyta consist of the Bryophyta (Moss), and the remainder of the Embryophyta, including the Anthocerotophyta (Hornsworts). The word stomatophyta means plant with stoma.

An updated phylogeny of Embryophyta based on the work by Novíkov & Barabaš-Krasni 2015 with plant taxon authors from Anderson, Anderson & Cleal 2007 and some clade names from Pelletier 2012 and Lecointre, et al.

- - Embryophyta
    - Marchantiophyta (Liverworts)
    - Stomatophyta
      - Bryophyta (Mosses)
      - - Anthocerotophyta (Hornworts)
        - Polysporangiophyta
