= Eorhynia =

Eorhynia Temporal range: Late Silurian

Scientific classification
- Kingdom: Plantae
- Clade: Tracheophytes
- Stem group: †Rhyniophytes
- Genus: †Eorhynia; T.A. Ishchenko (1975)

Species
- E. primigena T.A. Ishchenko (1975)

Extinct genus of Silurian plants

Eorhynia is a genus of extinct plants of the Late Silurian (Přídolí, around 430 to 420 million years ago) which somewhat resemble Rhynia. Fossils were found in Podolia in modern Ukraine.
