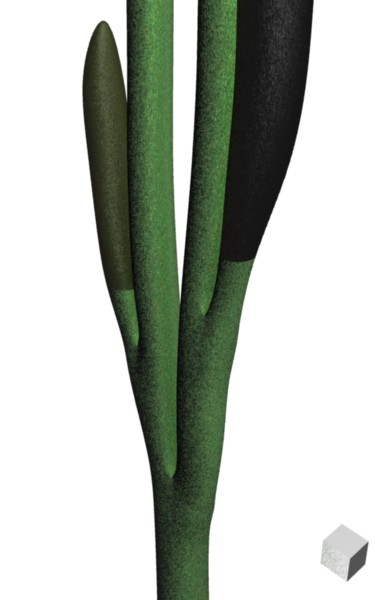
- Rough 3D rendering of Salopella. Scale cube: 1 mm

Scientific classification
- Kingdom: Plantae
- Clade: Embryophytes
- Clade: Tracheophytes
- Stem group: †Rhyniophytes
- Genus: †Salopella; Edwards & Richardson 1974

Species
- S. allenii Edwards & Richardson 1974; S. australis Tims & Chambers 1984; S. brasiliana Mussa et al. 1996; S. caespitosa Tims & Chambers 1984; S. marcensis Fanning et al. 1992; S. xinjiangensis Dou Yawei & Sun Zhehua 1983

= Salopella =

Salopella Temporal range: Late Silurian–Early Devonian

Extinct genus of Devonian plants

Salopella is a form genus for small fossil plants of Late Silurian to Early Devonian age. The diagnostic characters are naked axes branching isotomously, terminating in fusiform sporangia. The sporangia are unbranched, but in at least the type species the axes seem to branch just under the sporangia. It differs from the similar form genus Tortilicaulis in that the sporangia do not have spirally arranged cells, and from other similar form genera such as Cooksonia, Uskiella and Tarrantia in the shape of the sporangia.

Species have been reported from Wales, Xinjiang, Brazil and Australia. Most species are based on very small fragments of the tips of plants, the exceptions being the two Australian species which preserve rather more of the plant. The relationships of the genus are not clear because many anatomical details remain unknown. A useful summary table of what data is known was given by Edwards et al. It has been considered to be a member of the rhyniophytes.
