= Fusitheca =

Fusitheca Temporal range: Early Devonian

Scientific classification
- Kingdom: Plantae
- Clade: Tracheophytes
- Stem group: †Rhyniophytes
- Form taxon: †Cooksonioidea
- Genus: †Fusitheca; Wellman et al. 1998

Species
- F. fanningiae Wellman et al. 1998 (Type)

Extinct genus of Devonian plants

Fusitheca was a genus of land plant with branching axes. It is known from charcoalified Early Devonian deposits, its type locality being the Brown Clee Hill lagerstätten. Its spores form smooth-walled, unfused, naked dyads. Its axis comprises length-parallel filaments, and their dichotomies are T-shaped, with the branches bending to continue upwards.
