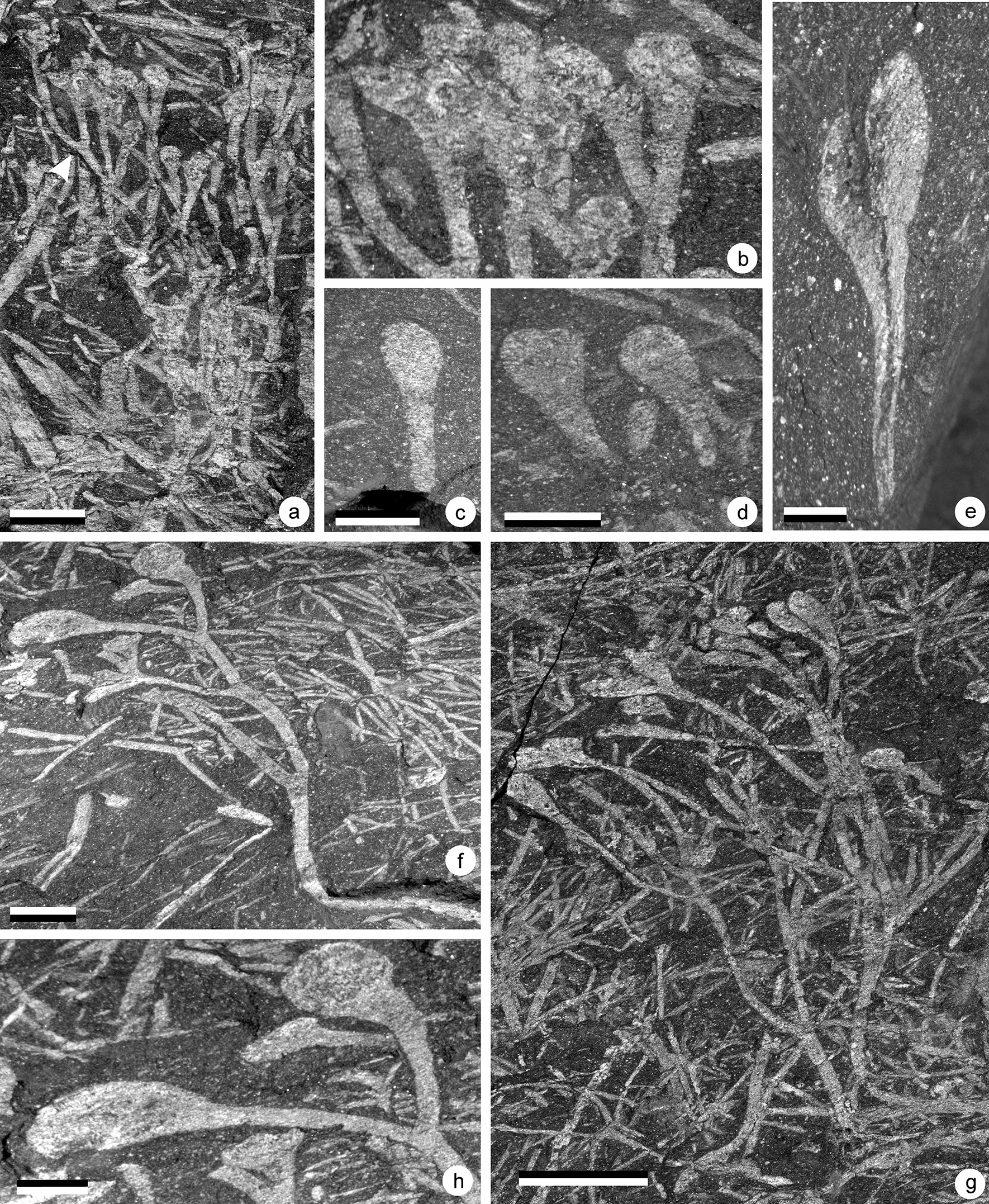
- Uskiella spargens at fig f-h

Scientific classification
- Kingdom: Plantae
- Clade: Tracheophytes
- Stem group: †Rhyniophytes (?)
- Genus: †Uskiella; Shute & D.Edwards 1989

Species
- †U. spargens Shute & D.Edwards 1989 †U. reticulata Fanning et al. 1992

= Uskiella =

Uskiella Temporal range: Early Devonian

Extinct genus of Devonian plants

Uskiella is a genus of small fossil plants of Early Devonian age (around 420 to 390 million years ago). The diagnostic characters are naked axes branching isotomously, terminating in ellipsoidal, vertically elongate flat sporangia which split longitudinally into two valves. Spores of U. reticulata have a reticulate appearance. Coalified specimens have been reported from Wales, with a possible occurrence in Australia.

The relationships of the genus are not clear because many anatomical details remain unknown. In 2004, Crane et al. published a cladogram for the polysporangiophytes in which Uskiella is basal to the lycophytes (clubmosses and relatives).

- tracheophytes
  - † Rhyniaceae (Huvenia, Rhynia, Stockmansella)
  - - † basal groups (Aberlemnia caledonica [=Cooksonia caledonica], Cooksonia pertoni)
    - - † basal groups
        Cooksonia cambrensis, Renalia, Sartilmania, Uskiella, Yunia
      - lycophytes
    - euphyllophytes

Hao and Xue in 2013 listed the genus as a rhyniophyte.
