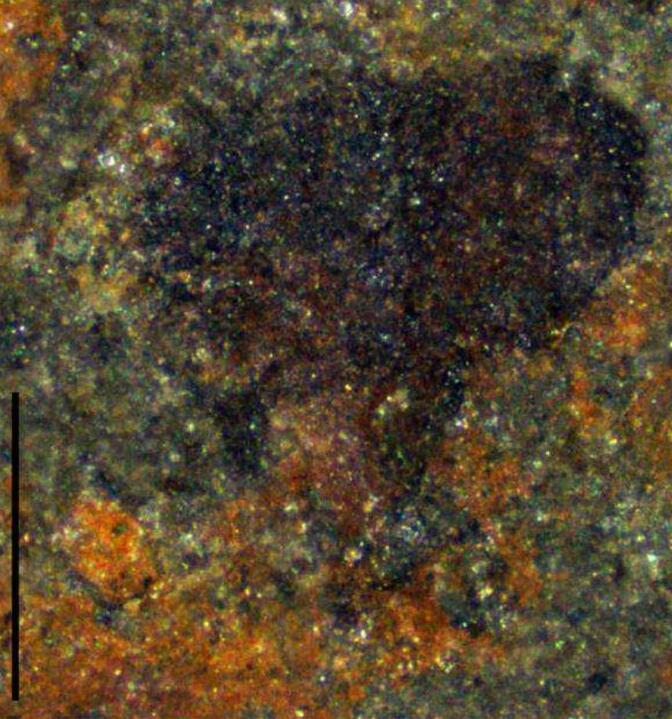

Scientific classification
- Kingdom: Plantae
- Clade: Embryophytes
- Clade: Polysporangiophytes
- Clade: Tracheophytes
- Genus: †Aberlemnia; Gonez & Gerrienne (2010)

Type species
- Aberlemnia caledonica Gonez & Gerrienne (2010)

Species
- A. bohemica (Schweitzer (1980)) Sakala, Pšenička & Kraft (2018); A. caledonica (Edwards (1970)) Gonez & Gerrienne (2010)

= Aberlemnia =

Aberlemnia Temporal range: Early Devonian

Extinct genus of vascular plants

Aberlemnia is a genus of extinct vascular plants of the Early Devonian (around 420 to 390 million years ago), which consisted of leafless stems with terminal spore-forming organs (sporangia). Fossils found in Scotland were initially described as Cooksonia caledonica. A later review, which included new and more complete fossils from Brazil, showed that the specimens did not fit the circumscription of the genus Cooksonia; accordingly a new genus Aberlemnia was proposed.

== Description ==
Fossils from which the genus was first described were found in the Aberlemno quarry, Scotland. Other fossils now assigned to Aberlemnia caledonica have been found in Wales, Brazil and possibly Bolivia. Plants consisted of smooth leafless stems (axes) up to 1.4 mm wide, decreasing in width at each branching. Specimens branched up to five times, at angles between 25 and 55°, mainly dichotomously, although those from Brazil had some trichotomies. Spore-forming organs or sporangia were borne at the ends of the stems. Individual sporangia varied in shape. Smaller ones were more or less circular in outline, larger ones were kidney-shaped (reniform), up to 2 mm high and 3 mm wide. The difference in shape is interpreted as being due to growth and maturation. To release their spores, the sporangia split into two valves along the border opposite to the stem on which they were attached (i.e. distally).

== Taxonomy ==
Specimens were first attributed to Cooksonia caledonica by Edwards in 1970. According to a review of the genus Cooksonia by Gonez and Gerrienne, the sporangium of the type species (C. pertoni) is formed by a widening of the end of a stem. At maturity the sporangium is topped by a flattish disk (an operculum) and releases its spores when this breaks up. The sporangia of C. caledonica are quite different. No existing genus was considered to cover the precise morphology of this plant, so that a new genus Aberlemnia was put forward. The name is based on the location where the first fossils were found, Aberlemno in Scotland.

In 2013, Hao and Xue classified Aberlemnia as a rhyniopsid, in the subgroup they called "renalioids", along with Renalia and Hsua.

== Phylogeny ==
Gonez and Gerrienne consider that Cooksonia is the most basal of the stem group of the lycophytes, whereas their genus Aberlemnia diverged later and is more derived. Consistent with this position, the genus has a combination of inherited features or plesiomorphies, such as dichotomous branching and terminal sporangia, with more advanced features, such as bivalved sporangia, which are characteristic of the lycophytes. A cladistic study in which they included the two best-characterized species of Cooksonia, C. paranensis and C. pertonii, together with Aberlemnia caledonica (then still called C. caledonica) produced the following cladogram:

- - - Cooksonia paranensis
    - Cooksonia pertonii
  - - Sartilmania, Uskiella, Yunia
    - - Renalia
      - Aberlemnia caledonica
      - lycophytes
        - zosterophylls
        - lycopsids

== See also ==
- Devonian
- List of Early Devonian land plants
