= Resilitheca =

Resilitheca Temporal range: Early Devonian

Scientific classification
- Kingdom: Plantae
- Clade: Tracheophytes
- Stem group: †Rhyniophytes (?)
- Genus: †Resilitheca; D.Edwards et al., 1995
- Species: †R. salopensis

Binomial name
- †Resilitheca salopensis D.Edwards et al., 1995

Extinct genus of Devonian plants

Resilitheca is a genus of land plant known from kidney-shaped sporangia. It is known from charcoalified Early Devonian deposits, its type locality being the Brown Clee Hill lagerstätten. It was listed as a rhyniophyte by Hao and Xue in 2013.
