= Eogaspesiea =

Eogaspesiea Temporal range: Early Devonian

Scientific classification
- Kingdom: Plantae
- Clade: Tracheophytes
- Stem group: †Rhyniophytes
- Genus: †Eogaspesiea
- Species: †E. gracilis

Binomial name
- †Eogaspesiea gracilis Daber, 1960

Extinct genus of plants

Eogaspesiea was a genus of Early Devonian rhyniophyte with a tangled mess of branching axes that reached 10 cm in length. These probably emanated from a rhizome. Its (probably) alete spores had thin walls.
