= Sporathylacium =

Sporathylacium Temporal range: Early Devonian

Scientific classification
- Kingdom: Plantae
- Clade: Tracheophytes
- Stem group: †Rhyniophytes (?)
- Genus: †Sporathylacium
- Species: †S. salopense

Binomial name
- †Sporathylacium salopense Edwards et al., 2001

Extinct genus of Devonian plants

Sporathylacium was a genus of land plant known from its bivalved sporangia. It is known from charcoalified Early Devonian deposits, its type locality being the Brown Clee Hill lagerstätten. It was listed as a rhyniophyte by Hao and Xue in 2013.
