= Steganotheca =

Steganotheca Temporal range: Late Silurian

Scientific classification
- Kingdom: Plantae
- Clade: Polysporangiophytes
- Clade: Tracheophytes
- Stem group: †Rhyniophyta
- Genus: †Steganotheca

Extinct genus of vascular plants

Steganotheca is a genus of bushy, probably vascular plants with branched axes, known from upper Silurian strata. It has terminal sporangia and reached 5 cm in height.
