= Harlan Parker Banks =

American paleontologist (1913–1998)

Harlan Parker Banks (September 1, 1913 – November 22, 1998) was an American paleobotanist and Liberty Hyde Bailey Professor Emeritus in the College of Agriculture and Life Sciences at Cornell University, known for his studies of Devonian plants. A Fulbright Research Scholar and Guggenheim Fellow, he was a fellow of the American Association for the Advancement of Science, a member of the National Academy of Sciences, and president of the Botanical Society of America.

The standard author abbreviation H.P.Banks is used to indicate this person as the author when citing a botanical name.
