= Eohostimella =

Eohostimella Temporal range: Llandovery

Scientific classification
- Kingdom: Plantae
- Clade: Tracheophytes
- Stem group: †Rhyniophytes (?)
- Genus: †Eohostimella; J.M.Schopf (1966)
- Species: †E. heathana

Binomial name
- †Eohostimella heathana J.M.Schopf (1966)

Extinct plant of the Early Silurian age

Eohostimella heathana is an early, probably terrestrial, plant known from compression fossils of Early Silurian age (Llandovery, around 440 to 430 million years ago). The chemistry of its fossils is similar to that of fossilised vascular plants, rather than algae. Its anatomy constitutes upright, cylindrical tubes, with a thickened outer cortex, which might have contained traces of lignin or a similar compound, even though no tracheids or similar vessels have been found; the lignin-like compound was presumably associated with its thick outer cortex. It branched dichotomously and might have borne small spines. It was probably affiliated with the rhyniophytes.
