= Patricia G. Gensel =

American botanist and paleobotanist

- Born: Patricia Gabbey Gensel; March 18, 1944; Buffalo, New York, United States
- Education: Hope College
- Occupations: botanist, paleobotanist
- Known for: research on Paleozoic plants

Patricia Gabbey Gensel (born March 18, 1944) is an American botanist and paleobotanist.

== Life ==
Gensel was born in Buffalo, New York, and attended Hope College in Holland, Michigan, earning a B.A. in 1966. She obtained her Ph.D. in 1972 from the University of Connecticut. Until her retirement in 2024, Gensel was on the faculty of the Biology Department of the University of North Carolina at Chapel Hill.

Gensel is noted for her research on Paleozoic plants. She served as president of the Botanical Society of America for 2000–2001. Gensel is the namesake of the genus, Genselia Knaus, which consists of four species of early Carboniferous plants found in the Pocono and Price Formations in the Appalachian Basin of North America.

== Publications ==
- Gensel, Patricia G.; Andrews, Henry N., eds. (1984). Plant Life in the Devonian. New York: Praeger. ISBN 978-0030620027.
- Bourque, Pierre-André; Desbiens, Sylvain; Gensel, Patricia G., eds. (2005). Silurian-Devonian biota and paleoenvironments of Gaspé Peninsula and northern New Brunswick. Halifax, Nova Scotia: North American Paleontological Convention.
- Gensel, Patricia G.; Edwards, Dianne, eds. (2000). Plants Invade the Land: Evolutionary and Environmental Perspectives. New York: Columbia University Press. ISBN 978-0231111614.
- Gastaldo RA, Gensel PG, Glasspool IJ, Hinds SJ, King OA, McLean D, Park AF, Stimson MR, Stonesifer T. (2024) Enigmatic fossil plants with three-dimensional, arborescent-growth architecture from the earliest Carboniferous of New Brunswick, Canada. Curr Biol. 2024 Feb 26;34(4):781-792.e3. doi: 10.1016/j.cub.2024.01.011. Epub 2024 Feb 2. PMID 38309270
