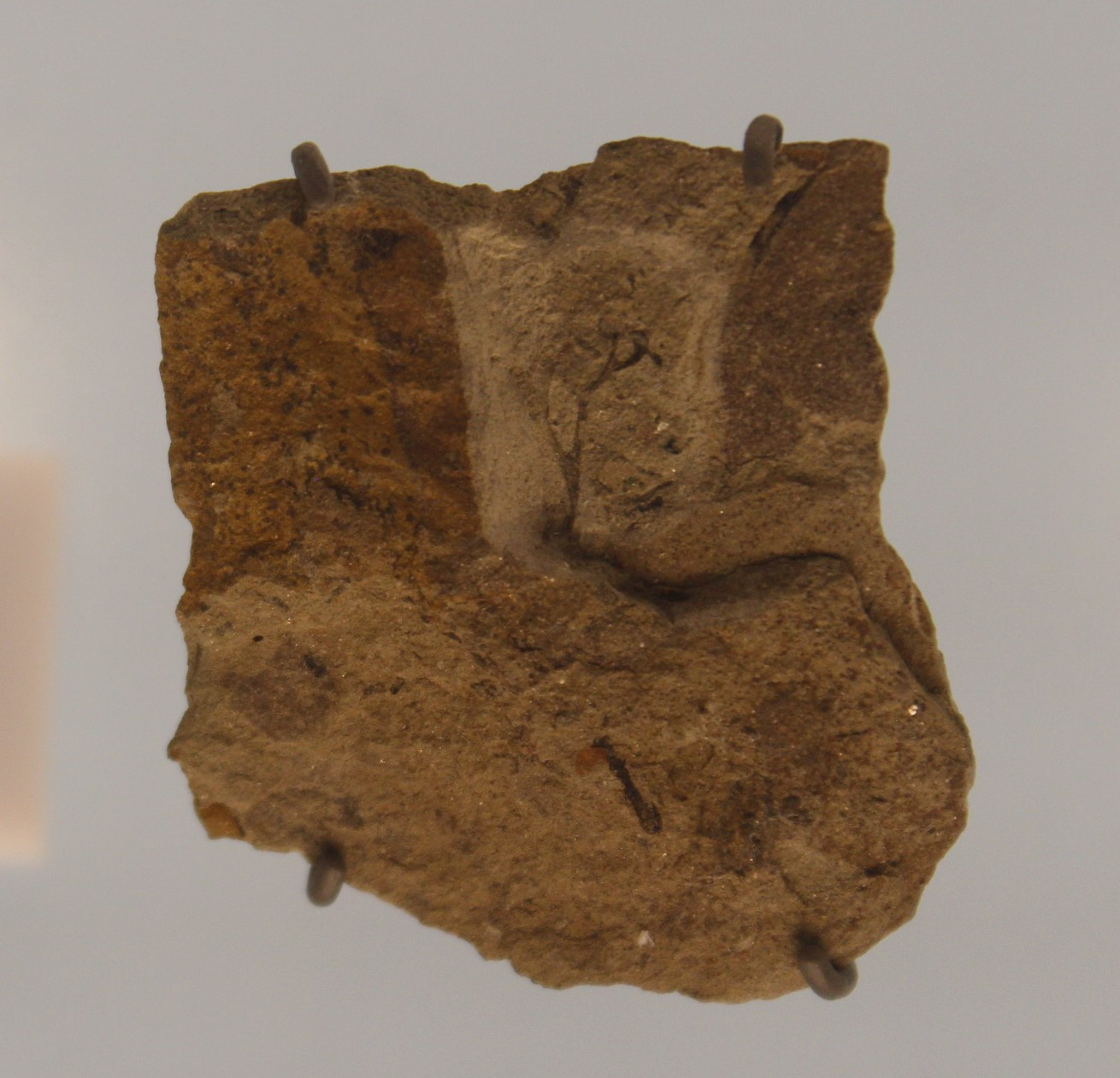
- C. pertoni fossil (USNM 298794), National Museum of Natural History

Scientific classification
- Kingdom: Plantae
- Clade: Tracheophytes
- Stem group: †Rhyniophytes
- Form taxon: †Cooksonioidea
- Genus: †Cooksonia; Lang 1937 emend. Gonez & Gerrienne 2010 non Druce 1905

Type species
- Cooksonia pertoni Lang 1937

Species
- C. paranensis Gerrienne et al. 2001; C. pertoni Lang 1937 (Note: Two spellings are in use: the spelling used by the original author of the name, C. pertoni, and the spelling C. pertonii (e.g. in Bateman, R.M.; Crane, P.R.; Dimichele, W.A.; Kenrick, P.R.; Rowe, N.P.; Speck, T.; Stein, W.E. (1998), "Early Evolution of Land Plants: Phylogeny, Physiology, and Ecology of the Primary Terrestrial Radiation", Annual Review of Ecology and Systematics, 29 (1): 263–92, Bibcode:1998AnRES..29..263B, doi:10.1146/annurev.ecolsys.29.1.263). The second is appropriate in botanical Latin when an epithet relates to a person, according to Article 60.11 of the International Code of Nomenclature for algae, fungi, and plants.); ?C. acuminata Mussa et al. 2002; ?C. barrandei Libertín et al. 2018; ?C. cambrensis Edwards 1979; ?C. degrezensis Senkevich; ?C. downtonensis Heard 1939; ?C. rusanovii Ananiev 1960; ?C. zhanyiensis Li & Cai 1978

= Cooksonia =

Cooksonia Temporal range: Wenlock–Early Devonian

Group of early vascular plants

Cooksonia is an extinct group of primitive land plants, treated as a genus, although probably not monophyletic. The earliest Cooksonia date from the middle of the Silurian (the Wenlock epoch); the group continued to be an important component of the flora until the end of the Early Devonian, a total time span of 433 to 393 million years ago. While Cooksonia fossils are distributed globally, most type specimens come from Britain, where they were first discovered in 1937. Cooksonia includes the oldest known plant to have a stem with vascular tissue and is thus a transitional form between the primitive non-vascular bryophytes and the vascular plants.

== Description ==
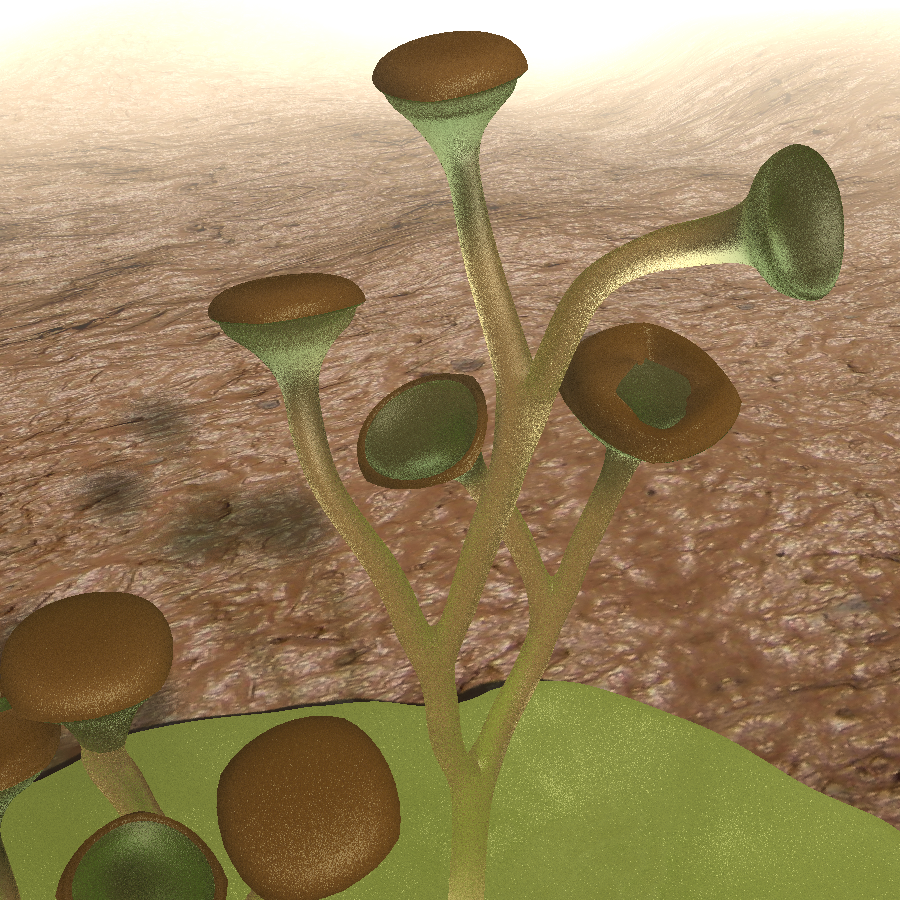
A reconstruction of Cooksonia, reconstructed with non-photosynthetic axes, dependent on its gametophyte, as per Boyce (2008)

Only the sporophyte phase of Cooksonia is currently known (i.e. the phase which produces spores rather than gametes). Individuals were small, a few centimetres tall, and had a simple structure. They lacked leaves, flowers and roots—although it has been speculated that they grew from a rhizome that has not been preserved. They had a simple stalk that branched dichotomously a few times. Each branch ended in a sporangium or spore-bearing capsule. In his original description of the genus, Lang described the sporangia as flattened, "with terminal sporangia that are short and wide", and in the species Cooksonia pertoni "considerably wider than high". A 2010 review of the genus by Gonez and Gerrienne produced a tighter definition, which requires the sporangia to be more-or-less trumpet-shaped (as in the illustration), with a 'lid' or operculum which disintegrates to release the spores.

Specimens of one species of Cooksonia have a dark stripe in the centre of their stalks, which has been interpreted as the earliest remains of water-carrying tissue. Other Cooksonia species lacked such conducting tissue.

Cooksonia specimens occur in a range of sizes, and vary in stem width from about 0.3 mm to 3 mm. Specimens of different sizes were probably different species, not fragments of larger organisms: fossils occur in consistent size groupings, and sporangia and spore details are different in organisms of different sizes. The organisms probably exhibited determinate growth (i.e. stems did not grow further after producing sporangia).

Some Cooksonia species bore stomata, which had a role in gas exchange; this was probably to assist in transpiration-driven transport of dissolved materials in the xylem, rather than primarily in photosynthesis, as suggested by their concentration at the tips of the axes. These clusterings of stomata are typically associated with a bulging in the axis at the neck of the sporangium, which may have contained photosynthetic tissue, reminiscent of some mosses.

As the genus is circumscribed by Gonez and Gerrienne, there are six possible species. C. pertoni, C. paranensis and C. banksii are all relatively similar with flat-topped, trumpet-shaped sporangia; stems are somewhat narrower in C. paranensis than in C. pertoni. Only one specimen of C. bohemica is known. It has stouter, more branched stems; the original shape of the sporangia is unclear because of poor preservation. C. hemisphaerica, described from the same locality as C. pertoni, differs in having sporangia of which the tops, at least as preserved, are hemispherical rather than flat. C. cambrensis also has spherical sporangia, but without the gradual widening at the base characteristic of the other species. Preservation of the sporangia is again poor. C. barrandei was described in 2018.

== Physiology ==
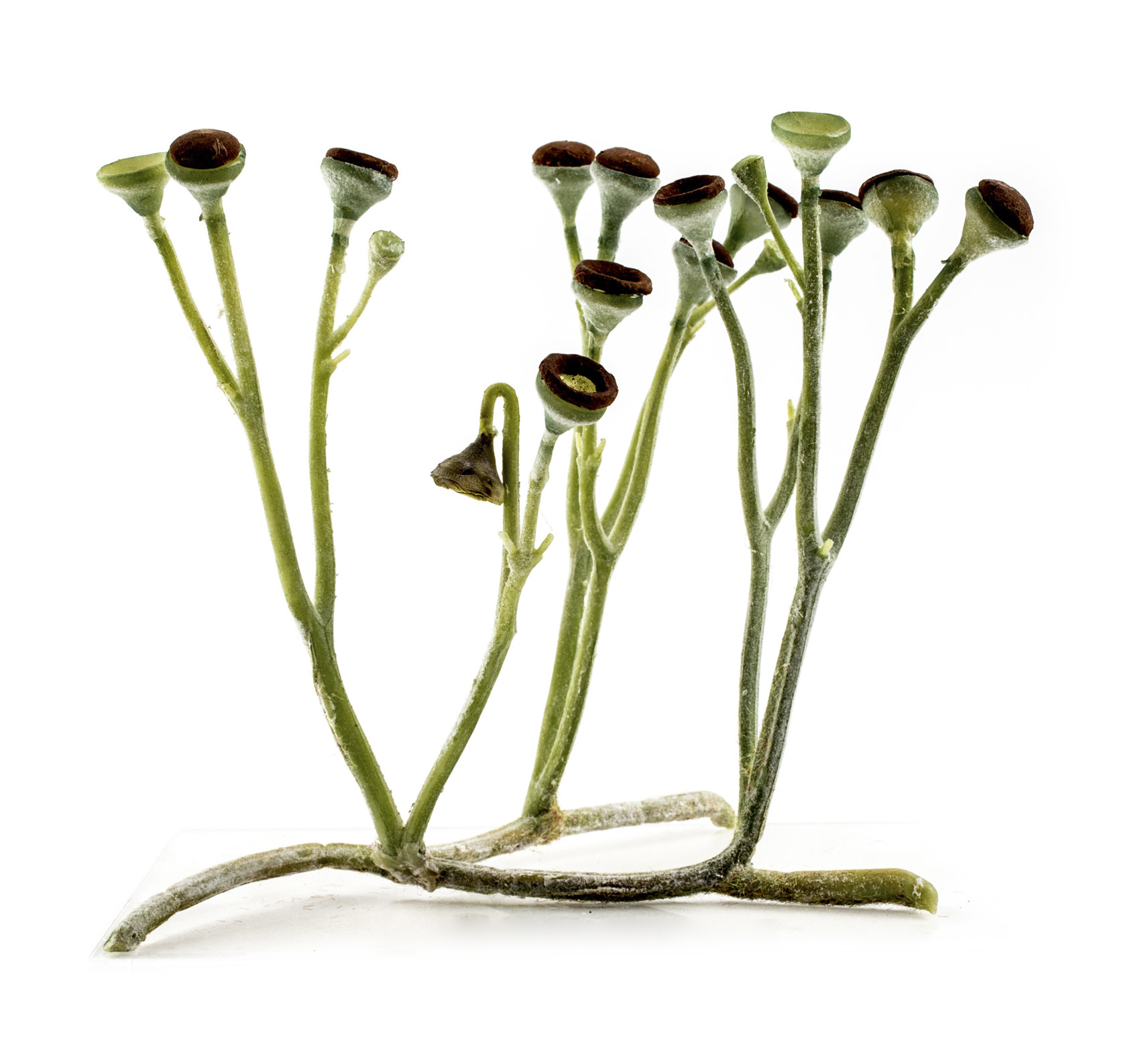
Reconstruction as an independent plant

While reconstructions traditionally depict Cooksonia as a green and red, photosynthesising, self-sufficient stem, it is likely that at least some fossils are of a sporophyte generation that was dependent on a gametophyte for its nutrition – a relationship that occurs in modern mosses and liverworts. However, no fossil evidence of a gametophyte of Cooksonia has been discovered to date.

The widths of Cooksonia fossils span an order of magnitude. Study of smaller Cooksonia fossils showed that once the tissue required to support the axes, protect them from desiccation, and transport water had been accounted for, no room remained for photosynthetic tissue, and the sporophyte may therefore have been dependent on the gametophyte. Further, the axis thickness is what would be expected if its sole role was to support a sporangium. It appears that, originally at least, the role of the axes in smaller species was solely to ensure continued spore dispersal, even if the axis desiccated. The potentially self-sufficient larger axes may represent the evolution of an independent sporophyte generation.

In 2018, the sporophyte of a new species, Cooksonia barrandei, was described, from about 432 million years ago. It is the oldest-known megafossil of land plants, as of May 2018. It was sufficiently robust to pass Boyce's test for possible self-sufficiency. Together with evidence that, unlike modern mosses and liverworts, hornwort sporophytes do have a degree of nutritional independence through photosynthesis, C. barrandei suggests that independent gametophyte and sporophyte generations could have been ancestral in land plants, rather than evolving later.

== Taxonomy ==
The first Cooksonia species were described by William Henry Lang in 1937 and named in honor of Isabel Cookson, with whom he had collaborated and who collected specimens of Cooksonia pertoni in Perton Quarry, Wales, in 1934. There were originally two species, Cooksonia pertoni and C. hemisphaerica. The genus was defined as having narrow leafless stems (axes), which branched dichotomously, with terminal sporangia that were "short and wide". There was a central vascular cylinder consisting of annular tracheids (water-conducting cells with thickened walls). Six other species were later added to the genus: C. crassiparietilis, C. caledonica, C. cambrensis, C. bohemica, C. paranensis and C. banksii. A review in 2010 concluded that the delineation of the genus was inaccurate and that some species needed to be removed; in particular those in which sporangia were not more-or-less trumpet-shaped. As amended by Gonez and Gerrienne, Cooksonia has the following species:

- C. pertoni Lang 1937 (the type species designated by Gonez & Gerrienne)
- C. paranensis Gerrienne et al. 2001

Seven further species are considered doubtful because of the poor preservation of the specimens, but are left in the genus:

- C. acuminata Mussa et al. 2002
- C. barrandei Libertín et al. 2018
- C. cambrensis Edwards 1979
- C. degrezensis Senkevich
- C. downtonensis Heard 1939
- C. rusanovii Ananiev 1960
- C. zhanyiensis Li & Cai 1978

Four species are excluded from the genus by Gonez and Gerrienne. Species that have been transferred or removed are:

- C. banksii Habgood et al. 2002 now Concavatheca banksii (Habgood, Edwards & Axe 2002) Morris et al. 2012b
- C. bohemica Schweitzer 1980 now Aberlemnia bohemica (Schweitzer 1980) Sakala, Pšenička & Kraft 2018
- C. caledonica Edwards 1970 now Aberlemnia caledonica (Edwards 1970) Gonez & Gerrienne 2010
- C. crassiparietilis Yurina 1964
- C. hemisphaerica Lang 1937

C. caledonica and the less well-preserved C. crassiparietilis have sporangia which are composed of two 'valves', splitting to release their spores along a line opposite to where they are attached to the stem (i.e. distally).

=== Phylogeny ===
For some years, it was suspected that Cooksonia and its species were poorly characterized. Thus four different kinds of spore, probably representing four different species, were found in sporangia originally identified as C. pertoni.

A 2010 study of the genus produced the consensus cladogram shown below (some branches have been collapsed to reduce the size of the diagram). This was based on data from an earlier study (by Kenrick and Crane), supplemented by further information on Cooksonia species resulting from the authors' own research.

- polysporangiophytes
  - Horneophytopsida
  - - Aglaophyton
    - tracheophytes
      - Cooksonia hemisphaerica
      - - Paratracheophytes
        - Cooksonia banksii, C. bohemica, C. cambrensis, C. paranensis, C. pertoni
        - - Sartilmania, Yunia, Uskiella
          - - Renalia, Cooksonia crassiparietilis, C. caledonica (=Aberlemnia caledonica)
            - lycophytes
        - euphyllophytes (higher plants: ferns, horsetails and seed plants)

A more recent phylogeny by Hao and Xue from 2013:

- Polysporangiophytes
  - Horneophytaceae [Protrachaeophytes]
  - Tracheophytes
    - Cooksoniaceae
    - - Aglaophyton
      - - Rhyniopsida
        - - Catenalis
          - - Aberlemnia
            - - Hsuaceae
              - - Renaliaceae
                - Eutracheophytes
                  - - Adoketophyton
                    - Zosterophyllopsida
                  - - Lycopodiopsida
                    - - Yunia
                      - Euphyllophytes

This confirms that the genus Cooksonia sensu Lang (1937) is polyphyletic. A core group of five species are placed together, unresolved between the euphyllophytes and the lycophytes. The poorly preserved C. hemisphaerica is placed as the most basal tracheophyte. Two other species, C. crassiparietilis and C. caledonica, are placed in the stem group of the lycophytes. These two species have been removed from Cooksonia sensu Gonez & Gerrienne (C. caledonica has since been placed in a new genus Aberlemnia). Both have sporangia which, although borne terminally rather than laterally, have a mechanism for releasing spores similar to those of the zosterophylls.

A second cladistic analysis was carried out using only the three best preserved and thus best known species, C. pertoni, C. paranensis, and C. caledonica. The position of C. caledonica was confirmed, but C. pertoni and C. paranensis now formed a single clade more clearly related to the lycophytes than the euphyllophytes.

=== Cooksonioids ===
Cooksonia and similar genera have been placed in a group called "cooksonioids". Originally the term was used for a group of plants fitting the general description of Cooksonia (i.e. simple plants with naked axes showing dichotomous branching and terminal sporangia), but with uncertain evidence of vascular tissue. Boyce restricted the group to forms with axes usually less than 1 mm in diameter, and hence possibly not capable of independent growth. In addition to Cooksonia, he included genera such as Salopella, Tarrantia and Tortilicaulis. Hue and Xao regarded cooksonioids as a group within the rhyniophytes with radially symmetrical sporangia of roughly the same height and width, and included Cooksonia pertoni, C. paranensis and C. hemisphaerica, but not C. crassiparietilis and Aberlemnia caledonica, as they had bilaterally symmetrical sporangia.

== See also ==
- Evolutionary history of plants
- Polysporangiophyte
