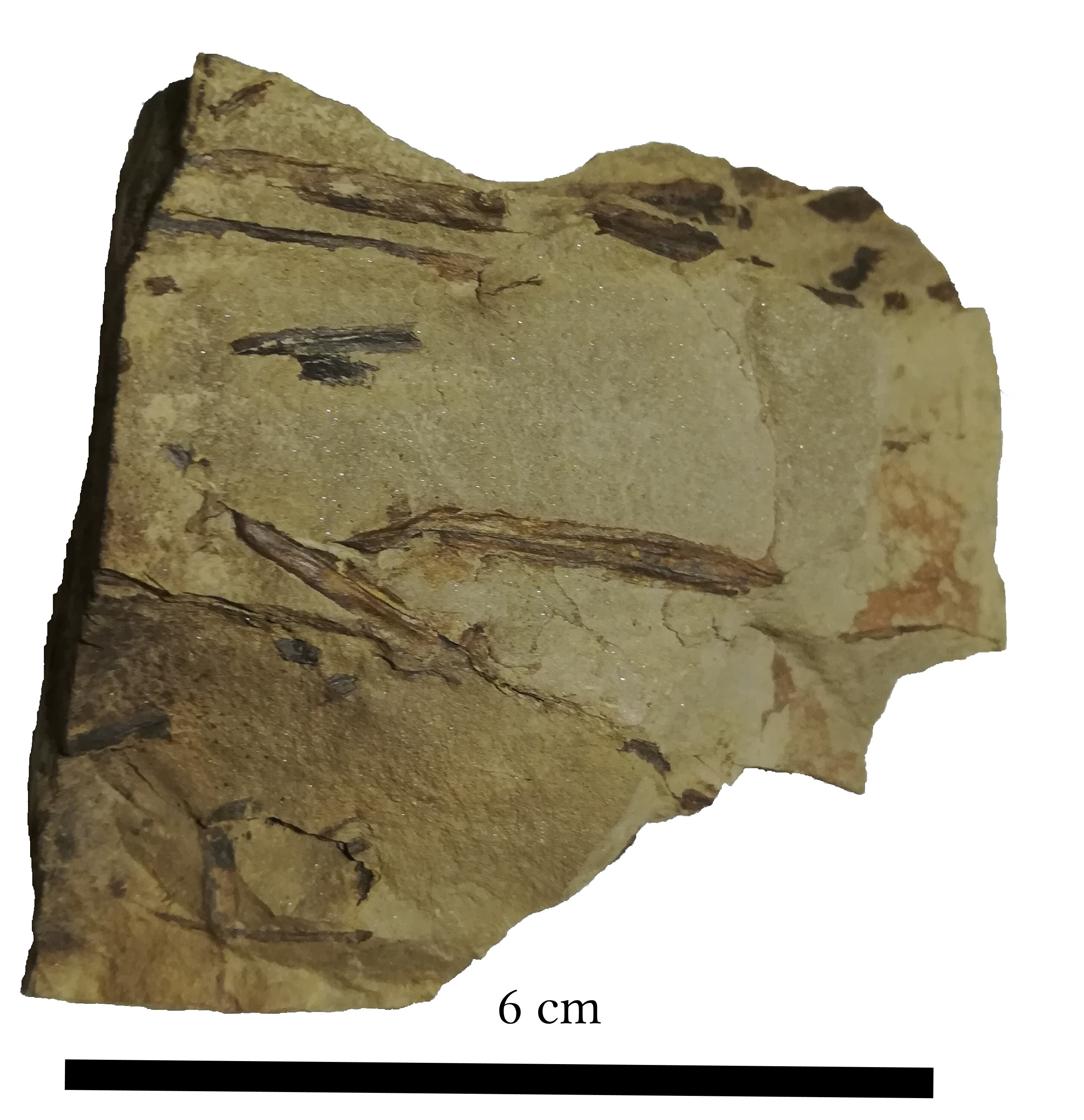
- Stockmansella langii

Scientific classification
- Kingdom: Plantae
- Clade: Tracheophytes
- Subdivision: †Rhyniophytina
- Class: †Rhyniopsida
- Order: †Rhyniales
- Family: †Rhyniaceae
- Genus: †Stockmansella; Fairon-Dem. (1986)

Type species
- Stockmansella langii (Stockmans 1939) Fairon-Dem. (1986)

Species
- S. langii (Stockmans (1939)) Fairon-Dem. (1986); S. remyi Schultka & Hass (1997)

= Stockmansella =

Stockmansella Temporal range: Middle Devonian

Extinct genus of Devonian plants

Stockmansella is a genus of extinct plants of the Middle Devonian (Eifelian stage, around 393 to 388 million years ago), fossils of which have been found in north-west Germany. The sporophyte generation consists of prostrate dichotomizing stems (axes) up to 10 cm long and around 3mm wide, which at intervals produce narrower smooth upright stems. These bear sporangia (spore-forming organs) on short lateral branches (sporangiophores). The prostrate stems have bulges from which rhizoids form. Both prostrate and upright stems have a central strand of conducting tissue which contains simple tracheids, so that Stockmansella is a vascular plant.

The genus was created by Fairon-Demaret for fossil forms previously assigned to Taeniocrada but which differ in having single lateral sporangia. (She initially gave the genus the name Stockmansia, but this had already been used for a genus of ferns.) The form genus Sciadophyton is thought to be the gametophyte stage of several early land plants, including Stockmansella, although as these forms have only been found as compressed fossils, their morphology is not entirely clear.

In 2004, Crane et al. published a cladogram for the polysporangiophytes, in which Stockmansella is placed in the Rhyniaceae, sister to all other tracheophytes (vascular plants).

- polysporangiophytes
  - Horneophytopsida
  - - Aglaophyton
    - Tracheophyta
      - Eutracheophytes
        - Lycopodiophytina and stem groups
        - Euphyllophytina
      - Rhyniaceae
        - Huvenia
        - - Rhynia
          - Stockmansella
