= Tarrantia =

Tarrantia Temporal range: Early Devonian

Scientific classification
- Kingdom: Plantae
- Clade: Tracheophytes
- Stem group: †Rhyniophytes (?)
- Genus: †Tarrantia; U.Fanning, D.Edwards & J.B.Richardson, 1992
- Species: †T. salopensis

Binomial name
- †Tarrantia salopensis U.Fanning, D.Edwards & J.B.Richardson, 1992

Extinct genus of Devonian plants

Tarrantia is a form genus of small fossil plants of Early Devonian age. The diagnostic characters are naked parallel-sided axes branching isotomously, terminating in solitary elliptical to ovate sporangia with height greater than width. The relationships of the genus are not clear because many anatomical details remain unknown. It has been treated as a possible rhyniophyte.

The only known species is from Wales.
