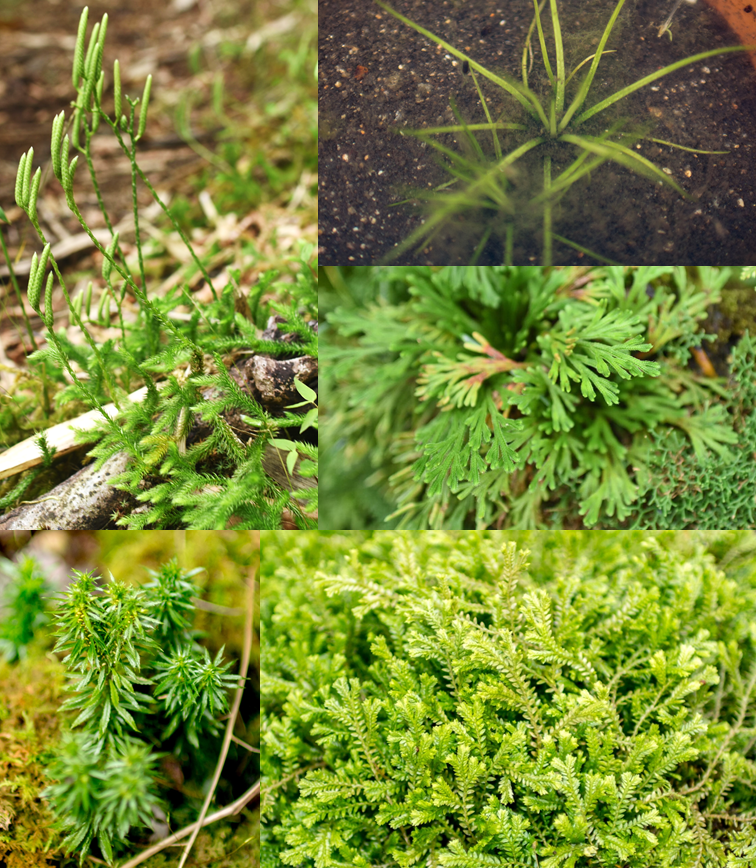
- Collage of modern lycophytes. Upper left: Lycopodium clavatum (Lycopodiales, Lycopodioideae) Lower left: Huperzia serrata (Lycopodiales, Huperzioideae) Top right: Isoetes japonica (Isoetales) Right centre: Selaginella tamariscina Lower right: Selaginella remotifolia Selaginellales

Scientific classification
- Kingdom: Plantae
- Clade: Embryophytes
- Clade: Tracheophytes
- Clade: Lycophytes

Classes
- †Zosterophyllopsida - zosterophylls; †Nothia; Lycopsids; †Drepanophycales; Lycopodiopsida - clubmosses, spikemosses, quillworts, scale trees

= Lycophyte =

Lycophyte Temporal range: 428–0 Ma Silurian to recent

Broadly circumscribed group of spore bearing plants

The lycophytes, are a clade of vascular plants that reproduce with spores. When broadly circumscribed, they include the clubmosses. They are sometimes placed in a division Lycopodiophyta or Lycophyta or in a subdivision Lycopodiophytina. They are one of the oldest lineages of extant (living) vascular plants; the group contains extinct plants that have been dated from the Silurian (ca. 425 million years ago). Lycophytes were some of the dominating plant species of the Carboniferous period, and included the tree-like Lepidodendrales, some of which grew over 40 metres (130 ft) in height, although extant lycophytes are relatively small plants.

The scientific names and the informal English names used for this group of plants are ambiguous. For example, "Lycopodiophyta" and the shorter "Lycophyta" as well as the informal "lycophyte" may be used to include the extinct zosterophylls or to exclude them.

== Description ==
Lycophytes reproduce by spores and have alternation of generations in which (like other vascular plants) the sporophyte generation is dominant. Some lycophytes are homosporous while others are heterosporous. When broadly circumscribed, the lycophytes represent a line of evolution distinct from that leading to all other vascular plants, the euphyllophytes, such as ferns, gymnosperms and flowering plants. They are defined by two synapomorphies: lateral rather than terminal sporangia (often kidney-shaped or reniform), and exarch protosteles, in which the protoxylem is outside the metaxylem rather than vice versa. The extinct zosterophylls have at most only flap-like extensions of the stem ("enations") rather than leaves, whereas extant lycophyte species have microphylls, leaves that have only a single vascular trace (vein), rather than the much more complex megaphylls of most other vascular plants. The extinct genus Asteroxylon represents a transition between these two groups: it has a vascular trace leaving the central protostele, but this extends only to the base of the enation. See § Evolution of microphylls.

Zosterophylls and extant lycophytes are all relatively small plants, but some extinct species, such as the Lepidodendrales, were tree-like, and formed extensive forests that dominated the landscape and contributed to the formation of coal.

== Taxonomy ==
=== Classification ===
In the broadest circumscription of the lycophytes, the group includes the extinct zosterophylls as well as the extant (living) lycophytes and their closest extinct relatives. The names and ranks used for this group vary considerably. Some sources use the names "Lycopodiophyta" or the shorter "Lycophyta" to include zosterophylls as well as extant lycophytes and their closest extinct relatives, while others use these names to exclude zosterophylls. The name "Lycopodiophytina" has also been used in the inclusive sense. English names, such as "lycophyte", "lycopodiophyte" or "lycopod", are similarly ambiguous, and may refer to the broadly defined group or only to the extant lycophytes and their closest extinct relatives.

The consensus classification produced by the Pteridophyte Phylogeny Group classification in 2016 (PPG I) places all extant (living) lycophytes in the class Lycopodiopsida. There are around 1,290 to 1,340 such species. For more information on the classification of extant lycophytes, see Lycopodiopsida § Classification.

=== Phylogeny ===
A major cladistic study of land plants was published in 1997 by Kenrick and Crane. In 2004, Crane et al. published some simplified cladograms, based on a number of figures in Kenrick and Crane (1997). Their cladogram for the lycophytes is reproduced below (with some branches collapsed into 'basal groups' to reduce the size of the diagram).

- panlycophyte
  - † basal groups
    Cooksonia cambrensis, Renalia, Sartilmania, Uskiella, Yunia
  - lycophytes
    - † Hicklingia
    - - †basal groups
        Adoketophyton, Discalis, Distichophytum (=Rebuchia), Gumuia, Huia, Zosterophyllum myretonianum, Z. llanoveranum, Z. fertile
      - †'core' zosterophylls
        Zosterophyllum divaricatum, Tarella, Oricilla, Gosslingia, Hsua, Thrinkophyton, Protobarinophyton, Barinophyton obscurum, B. citrulliforme, Sawdonia, Deheubarthia, Konioria, Anisophyton, Serrulacaulis, Crenaticaulis
      - - †basal groups
          Nothia, Zosterophyllum deciduum
        - lycopsids
          extant and extinct members

In this view, the "zosterophylls" comprise a paraphyletic group, ranging from forms like Hicklingia, which had bare stems, to forms like Sawdonia and Nothia, whose stems are covered with unvascularized spines or enations. The genus Renalia illustrates the problems in classifying early land plants. It has characteristics both of the non-lycophyte rhyniophytes – terminal rather than lateral sporangia – and of the zosterophylls – kidney-shaped sporangia opening along the distal margin.

A rather different view is presented in a 2013 analysis by Hao and Xue. Their preferred cladogram shows the zosterophylls and associated genera basal to both the lycopodiopsids and the euphyllophytes, so that there is no clade corresponding to the broadly defined group of lycophytes used by other authors.

- tracheophytes
  - basal groups
  - - - Adoketophyton
      - Zosterophyllopsida
    - - Lycopsida
      - - basal groups
        - Yunia, Dibracophyton
        - euphyllophytes

Some extinct orders of lycophytes fall into the same group as the extant orders. Different sources use varying numbers and names of the extinct orders. The following phylogram shows a likely relationship between some of the proposed Lycopodiopsida orders.

- Lycopodiopsida
  - - Lycopodiales
    - †Drepanophycales
  - - Selaginellales
    - - †Lepidodendrales
      - - †Pleuromeiales
        - Isoetales

== Evolution of microphylls ==
Suggested evolution of microphylls: (1) Sawdonia (2) Asteroxylon (3) Leclercqia

Within the broadly defined lycophyte group, species placed in the class Lycopodiopsida are distinguished from species placed in the Zosterophyllopsida by the possession of microphylls. Some zosterophylls, such as the Devonian Zosterophyllum myretonianum, had smooth stems (axes). Others, such as Sawdonia ornata, had flap-like extensions on the stems ("enations"), but without any vascular tissue. Asteroxylon, identified as an early lycopodiopsid, had vascular traces that extended to the base of the enations. Species in the genus Leclercqia had fully vascularized microphylls. These are considered to be stages in the evolution of microphylls.

== Gallery ==
Lycopodites, an early lycopod-like fossil

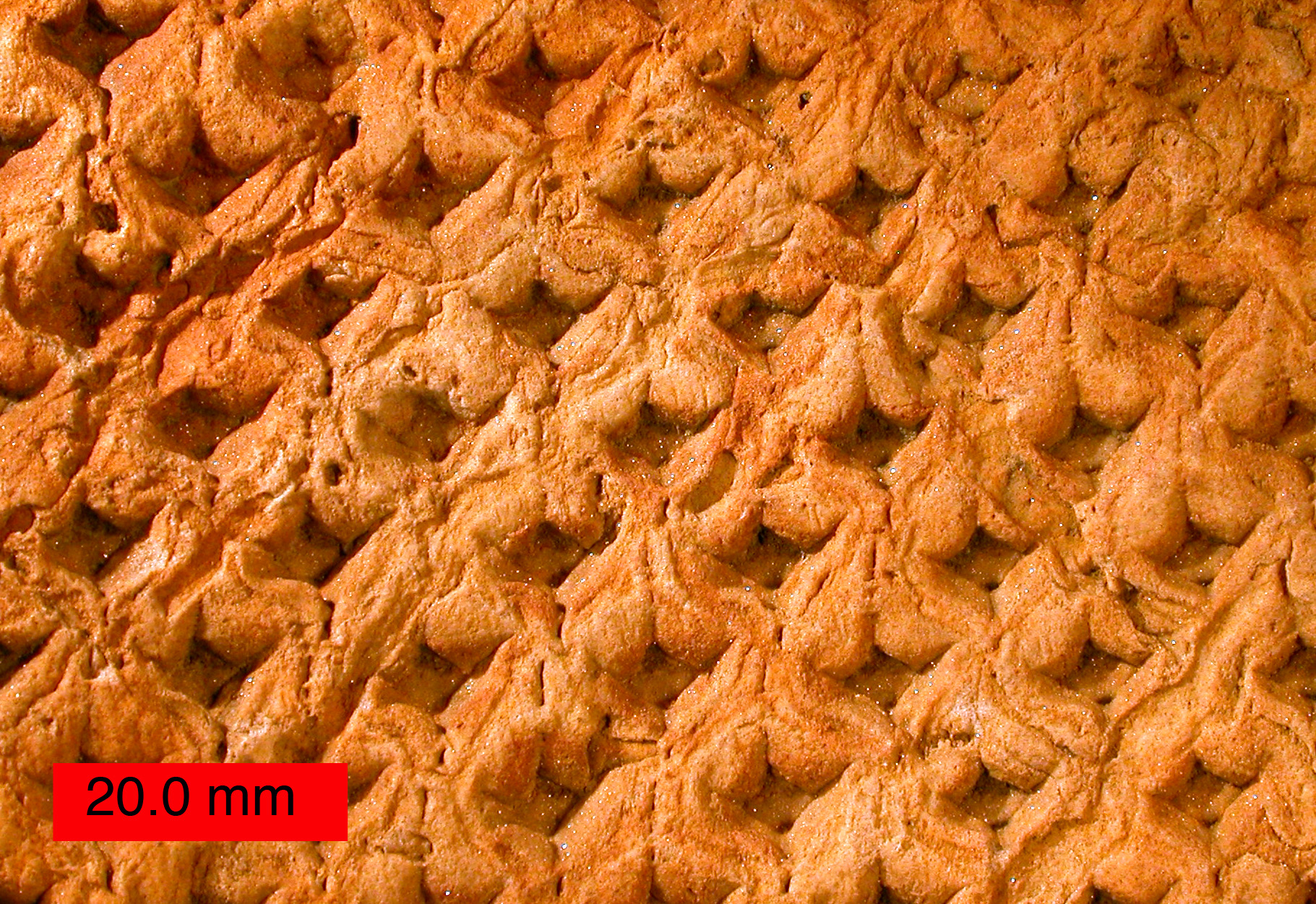
External mold of Lepidodendron from the Upper Carboniferous of Ohio.

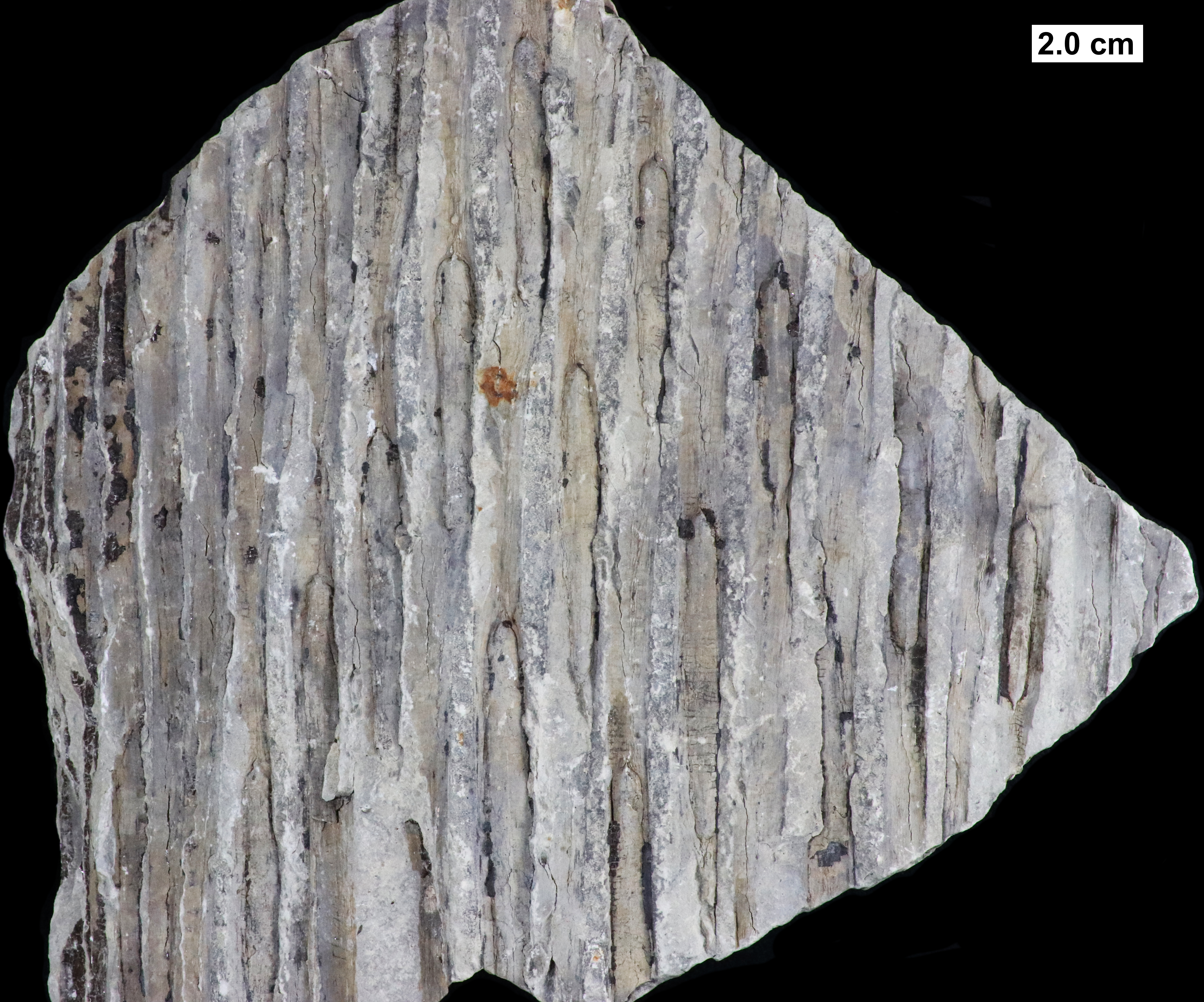
Lycopod bark showing leaf scars, from the Middle Devonian of Wisconsin.

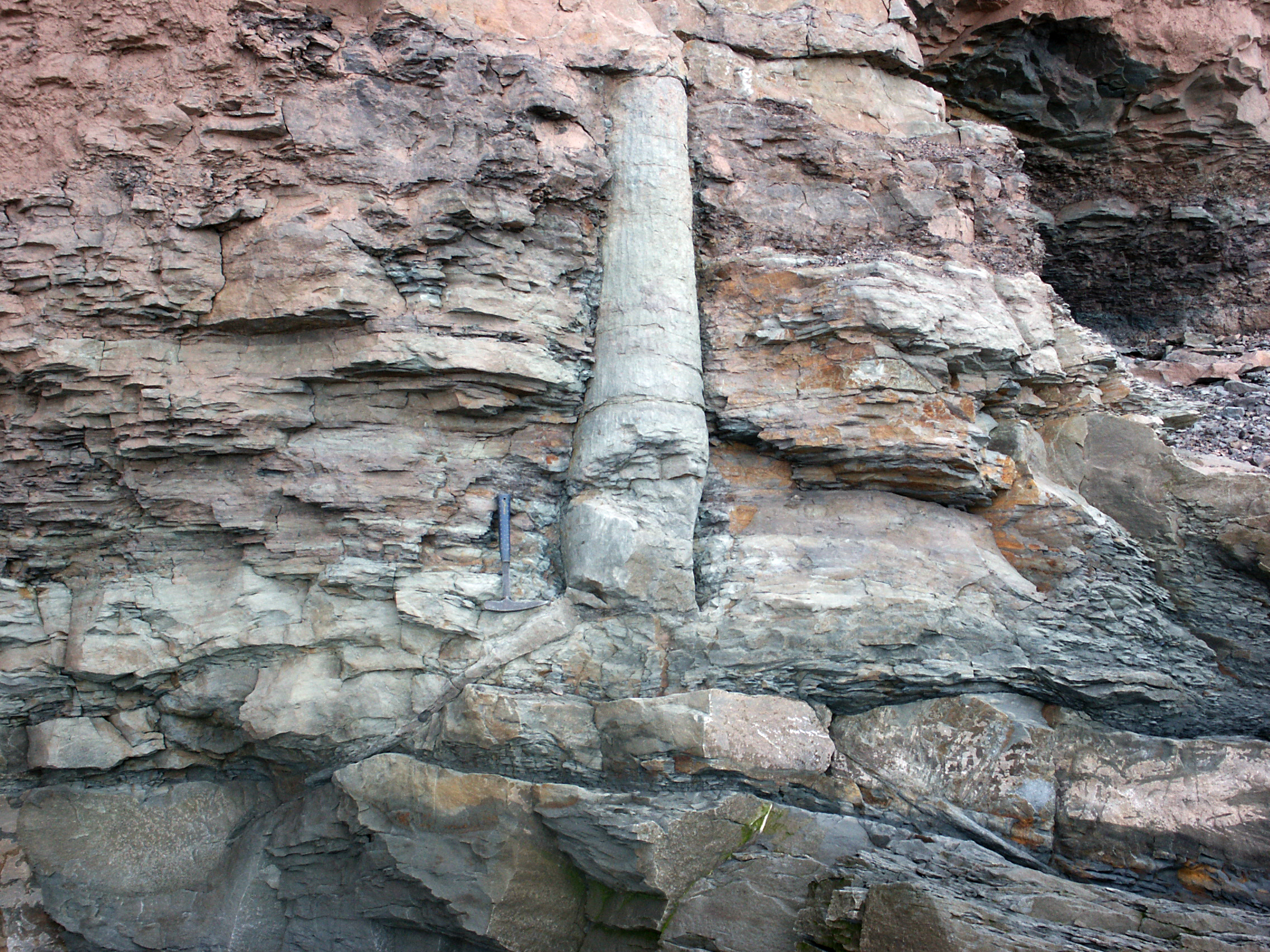
Fossil in situ lycopsid, probably Sigillaria, with attached stigmarian roots.

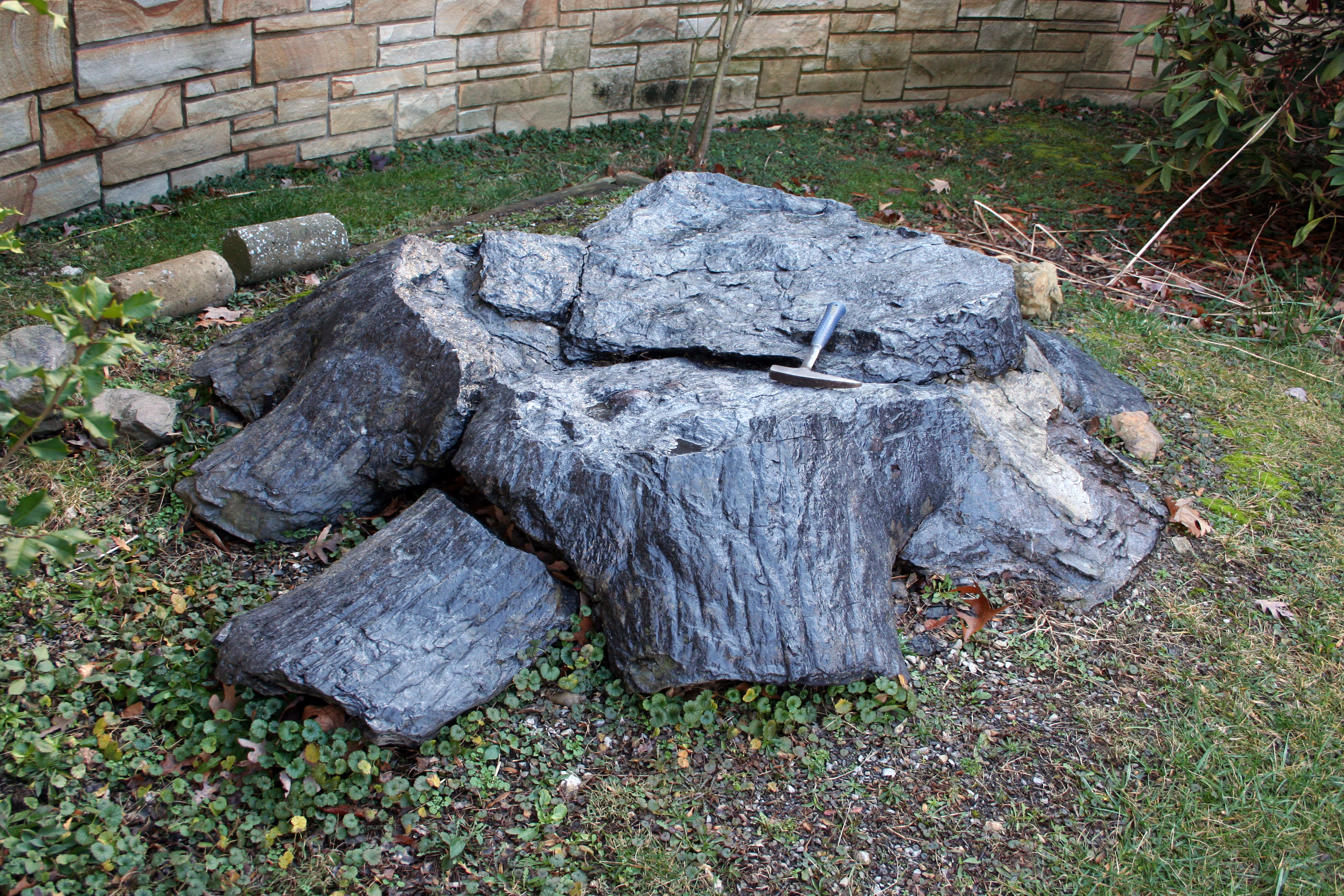
Base of a fossil lycopsid showing connection with stigmarian roots.

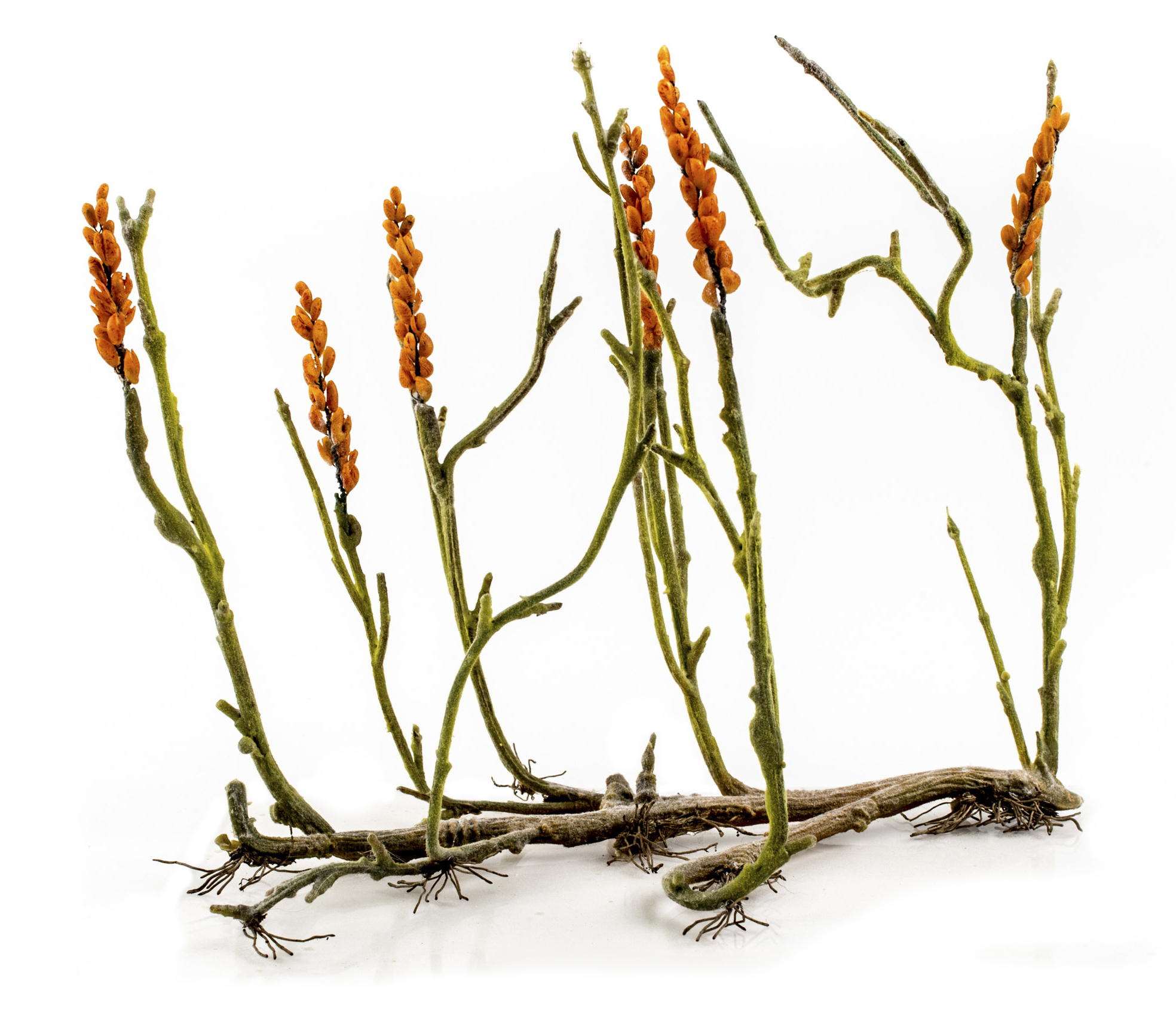
Reconstruction of a Silurian Zosterophyllum

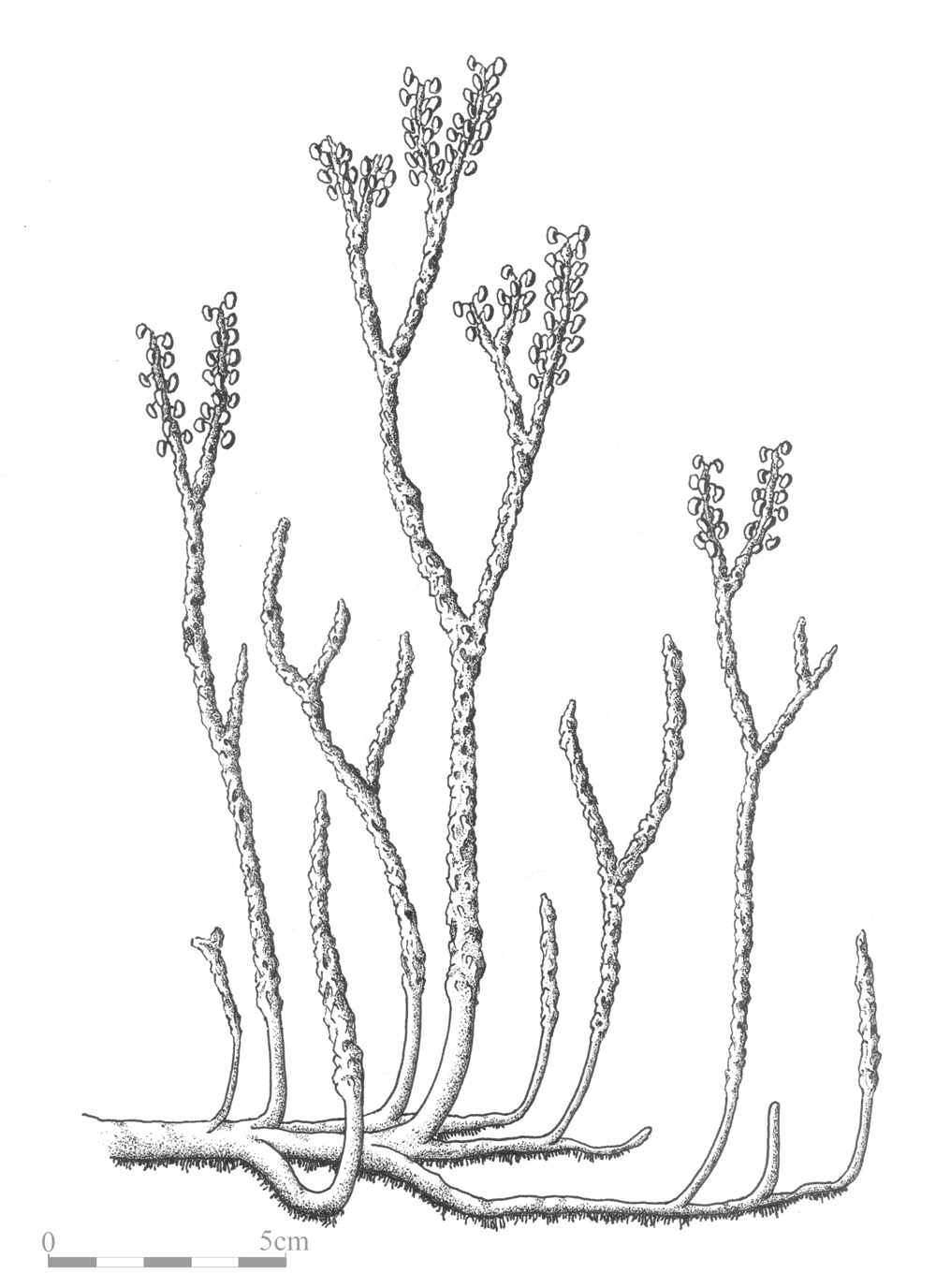
Reconstruction of Nothia aphylla

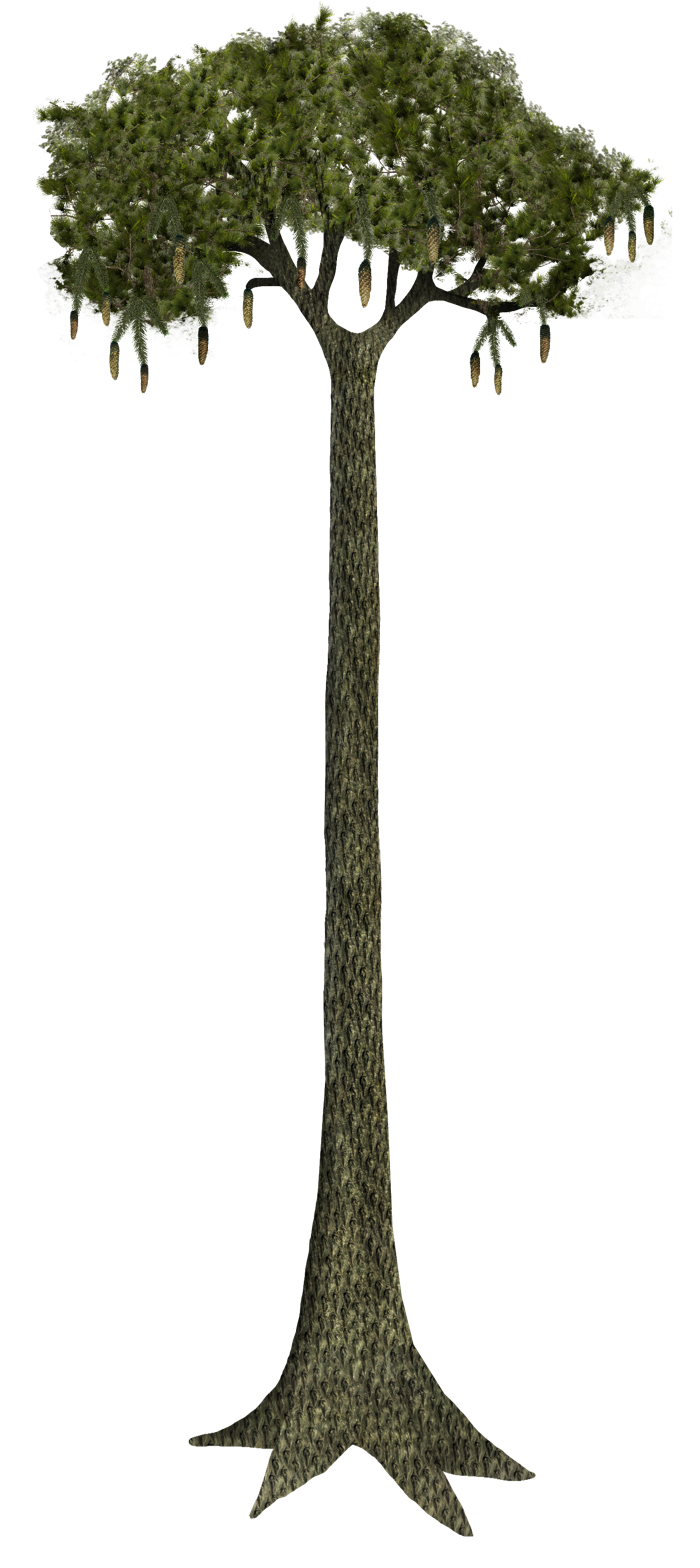
Reconstruction of Lepidodendron

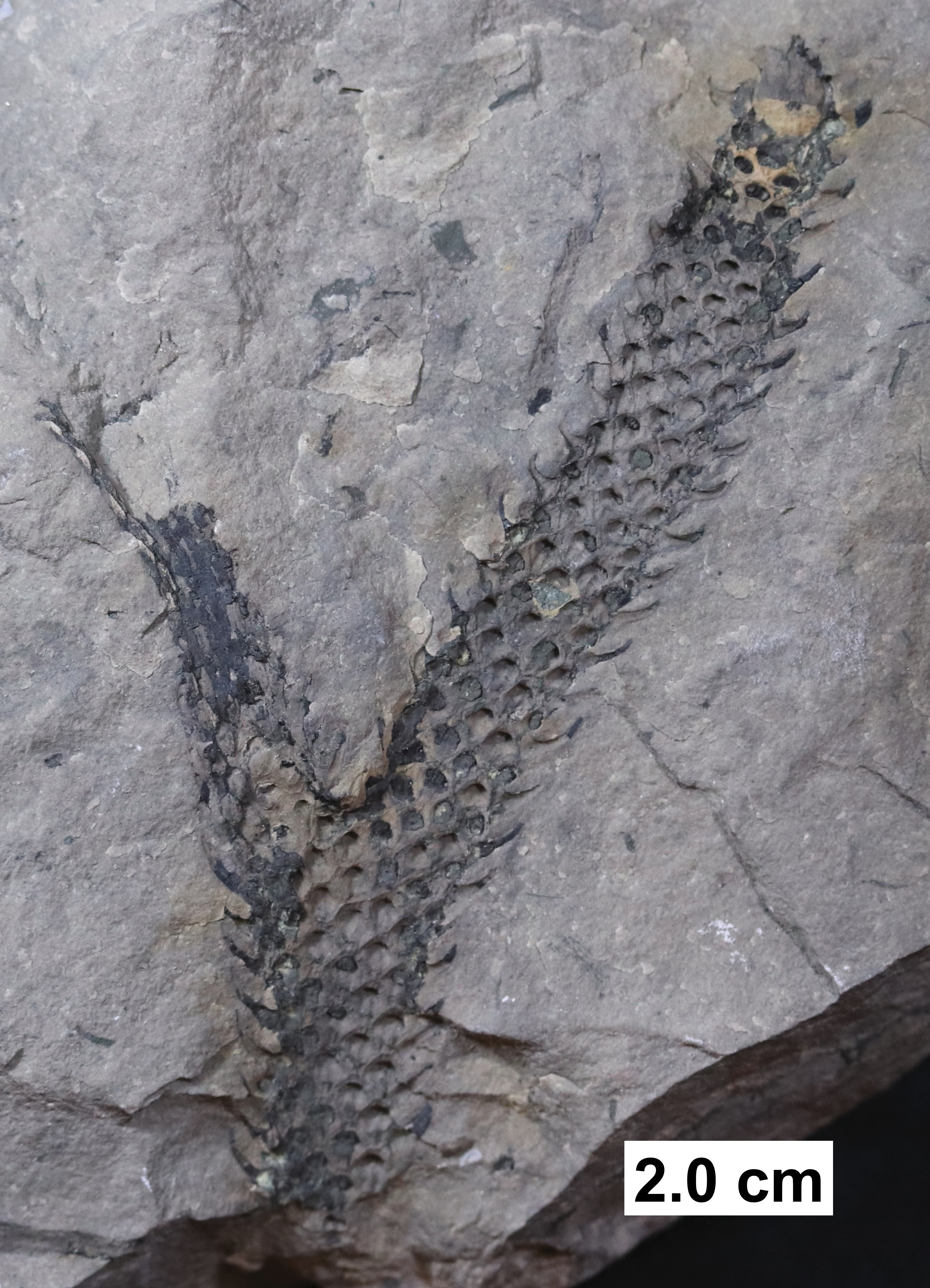
Lycopod axis (branch) from the Middle Devonian of Wisconsin.

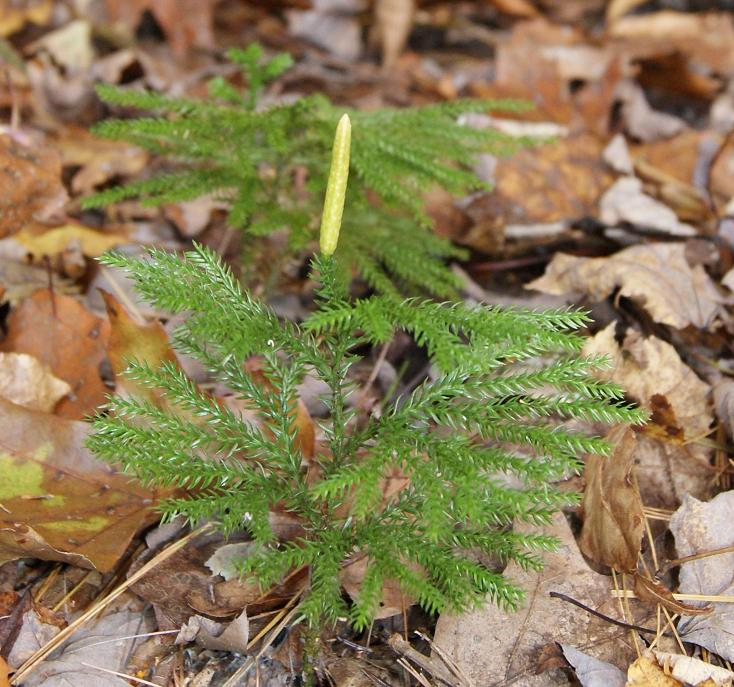
Lycopodium dendroideum, a modern member of the Lycopodiales

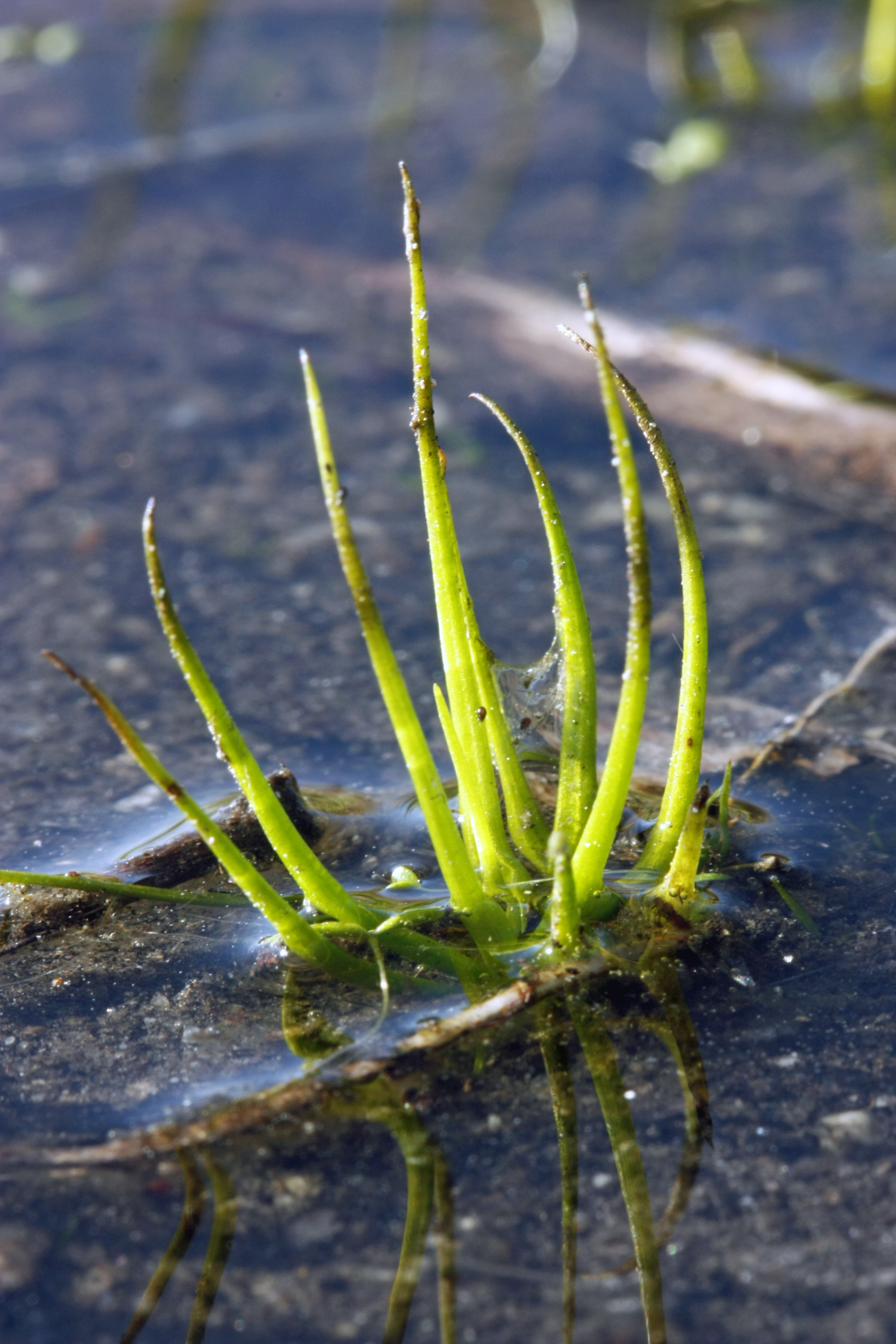
Isoetes melanospora, a modern member of the Isoetales

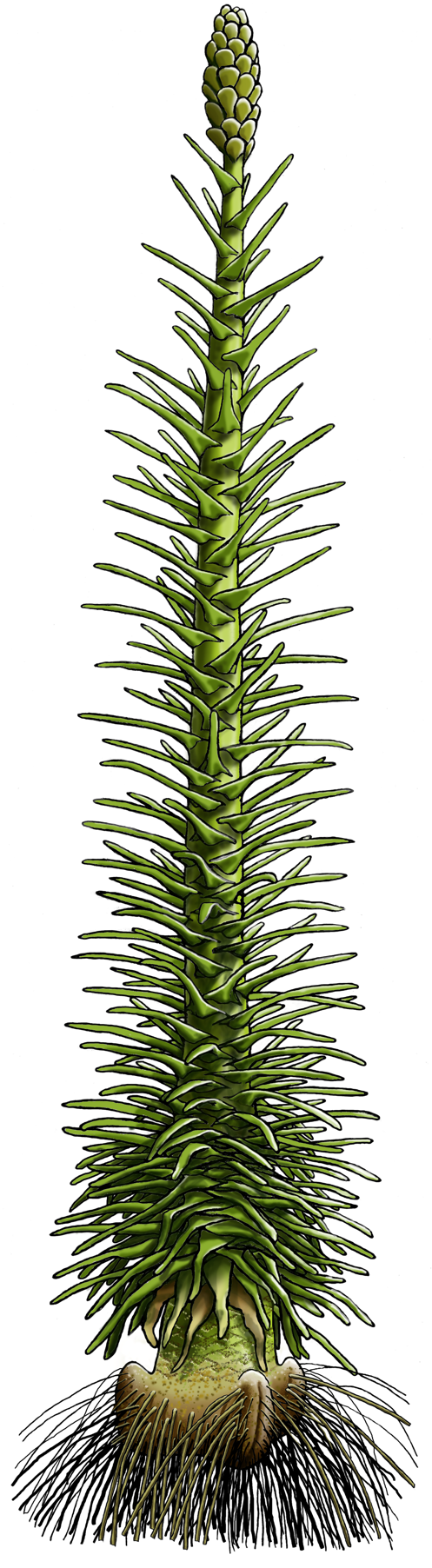
Restoration of Pleuromeia, an extinct Isoetales genus from the Early Triassic
