= Huvenia =

Huvenia Temporal range: Early Devonian

Scientific classification
- Kingdom: Plantae
- Clade: Tracheophytes
- Subdivision: †Rhyniophytina
- Class: †Rhyniopsida
- Order: †Rhyniales
- Family: †Rhyniaceae
- Genus: †Huvenia; Hass & W.Remy (1991)

Type species
- Huvenia kleui Hass & W.Remy (1991)

Species
- †H. elongata Schultka (1991); †H. kleui Hass & W.Remy (1991)

Extinct genus of Devonian plants

Huvenia is a genus of extinct plants of the Early Devonian (Pragian or Siegenian stage, around 413 to 411 million years ago), found in slate deposits of the Rhenish Massif. The sporophyte generation consisted of leafless stems (axes), which appear to be flattened, and which branch dichotomously. The strand of conducting tissue contains simple tracheids, making this a vascular plant (tracheophyte). The sporangia (spore-forming organs) are borne on the ends of short branching stems (sporangiophores) rather than terminating main stems as in some other early land plants. Sporangia appear to be twisted, but it is not clear whether this feature was present in life or developed after death.

In 2004, Crane et al. published a cladogram for the polysporangiophytes, in which Huvenia is placed in the Rhyniaceae. (See that article for the cladogram.)
