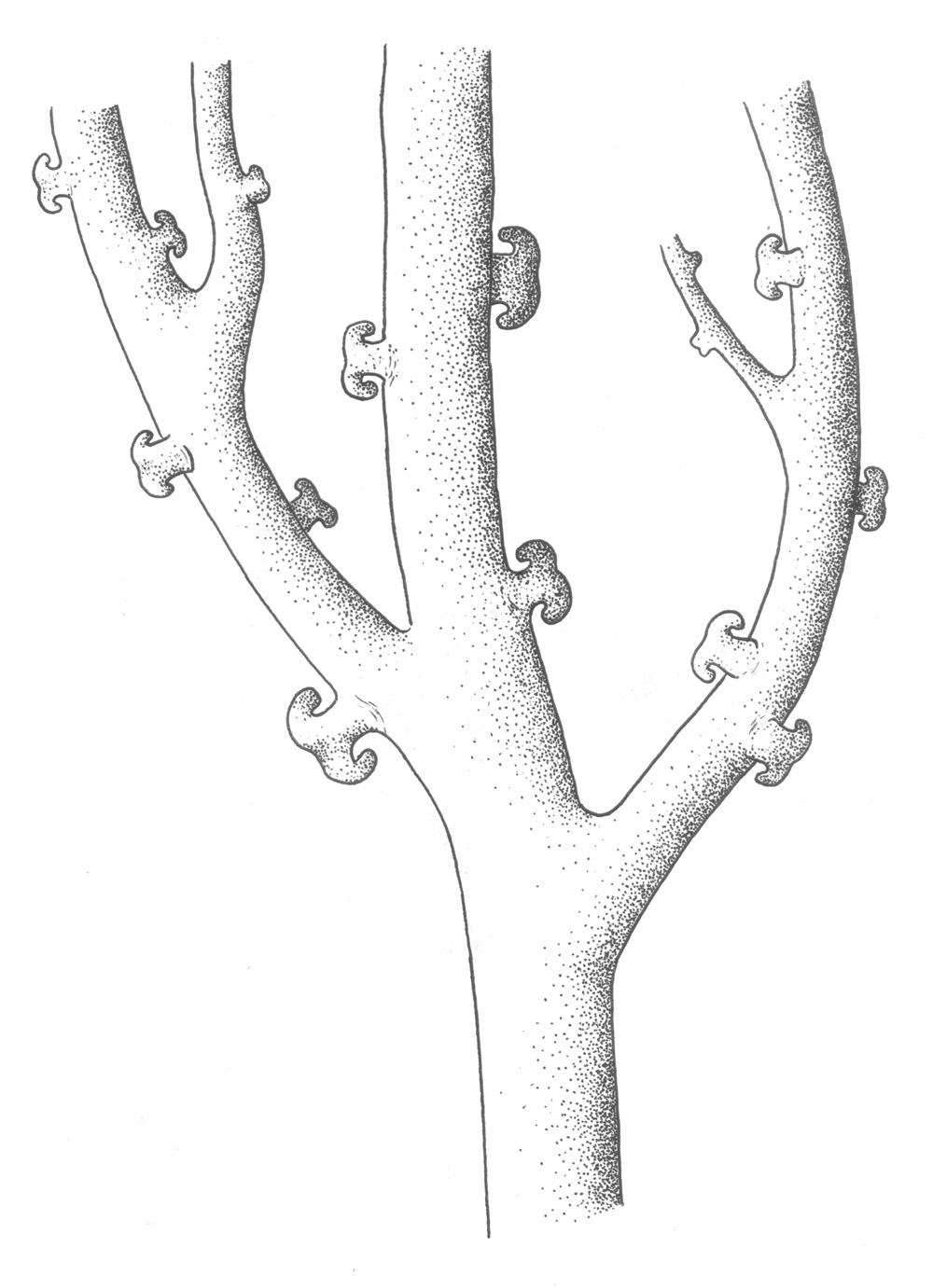

Scientific classification
- Kingdom: Plantae
- Clade: Tracheophytes
- Order: incertae sedis
- Genus: †Aarabia; Mey.-Berth. & Gerrienne

Species
- A. brevicaulis Mey.-Berth. & Gerrienne (2001)

= Aarabia =

Aarabia Temporal range: Emsian

Extinct genus of vascular plants

Aarabia is a genus of extinct vascular plants found in central Morocco in outcrops of Early Devonian age (Emsian, around 411 to 393 million years ago). The leafless plant has a complex branching system with a main stem and at least three orders of side branches. In addition to these long branches, stems bore very short branches, which typically branched once into two curved sections. Spore-forming organs or sporangia were borne singly on reduced lateral branches in groups of at least three. The genus is thought to be related to the euphyllophytes – modern ferns and seed plants.

== Description ==
Fossils were found in an outcrop believed to be of Emsian age (around 410 to 390 million years ago) northwest of the town of Azrou in central Morocco. They were 'adpressions' – a mixture of compressed and chemically altered remains of the original plant and impressions of its shape. Only central parts of the plant were found, the longest being 9 cm.

Stylized reconstruction of part of Aarabia brevicaulis to show the growth habit of vegetative branches. Based on the information in Meyer-Berthaud & Gerrienne 2001. Scale bar is 1 cm.

Stems (axes) were bare of leaves, spines or other protrusions, and were between 1.5 and 5 mm in diameter. Branching was 'pseudomonopodial', i.e. resulted in a 'main' stem and a lateral branch. There were up to four orders of branching; the branches were borne in two rows on opposite sides of the stem, producing a relatively two-dimensional structure. All orders of branches appear to have borne distinctive short branches which typically divided only once, the final sections having tips which curved away from each other and back towards the stem which bore them. Meyer-Berthaud and Gerrienne were unable to decide whether these short branches were generally capable of further growth or had ceased to grow and were adapted for some particular function.

Only poorly preserved specimens had sporangia. Up to three sporangia were found on a "reduced lateral branch system". Individual sporangia were 1.8 to 4 mm long and 1 to 1.4 mm wide and probably hung downwards. No spores were found inside the sporangia, but large spores with an average diameter of 270 μm were found close to sporangia and may have been released from them. If so, Aarabia had megaspores and could be the earliest known plant with 'heterospory', i.e. two distinct sizes of spore.

== Taxonomy ==
Aarabia brevicaulis was named by Meyer-Berthaud and Gerrienne in 2001. The generic name is derived from the locality close to Jbel ben Aarab, near Azrou in Central Morocco. The specific epithet was chosen to reflect the short lateral branches.

== Phylogeny ==
Aarabia shares features with basal euphyllophytes (Banks' trimerophytes). Two of these are pseudomonopodial branching, which results in a clear difference between a 'main' stem and a lateral stem, and elongated sporangia, taller than wide, borne at the ends of fertile branch systems which are differentiated from other branches. Like some Psilophyton species, Aarabia had short side branches in which the last sections curved back on themselves. On the other hand, Aarabia had relatively few sporangia in each fertile branching unit and they were single, not paired, whereas most trimerophytes had large clusters of sporangia carried in pairs which were often twisted around one another.

Meyer-Berthaud and Gerrienne added Aarabia to the data set which had been used by Kenrick and Crane in their analysis of the phylogeny of the polysporangiophytes, and generated a new phylogenetic tree. This placed Aarabia as the sister to the euphyllophytes. However, the analysis was regarded as "tentative", with 16 out of 33 chararacters which were used in constructing the tree being unknown. The diagram below is based on their results and the summary cladogram published by Crane et al.

- - Aarabia
  - euphyllophytes
    - † Eophyllophyton
    - - † basal groups (Psilophyton crenulatum, Ps. dawsonii)
      - - moniliforms (ferns; extant and extinct members)
        - - † basal groups (Pertica, Tetraxylopteris)
          - spermatophytes (seed plants; extant and extinct members)
