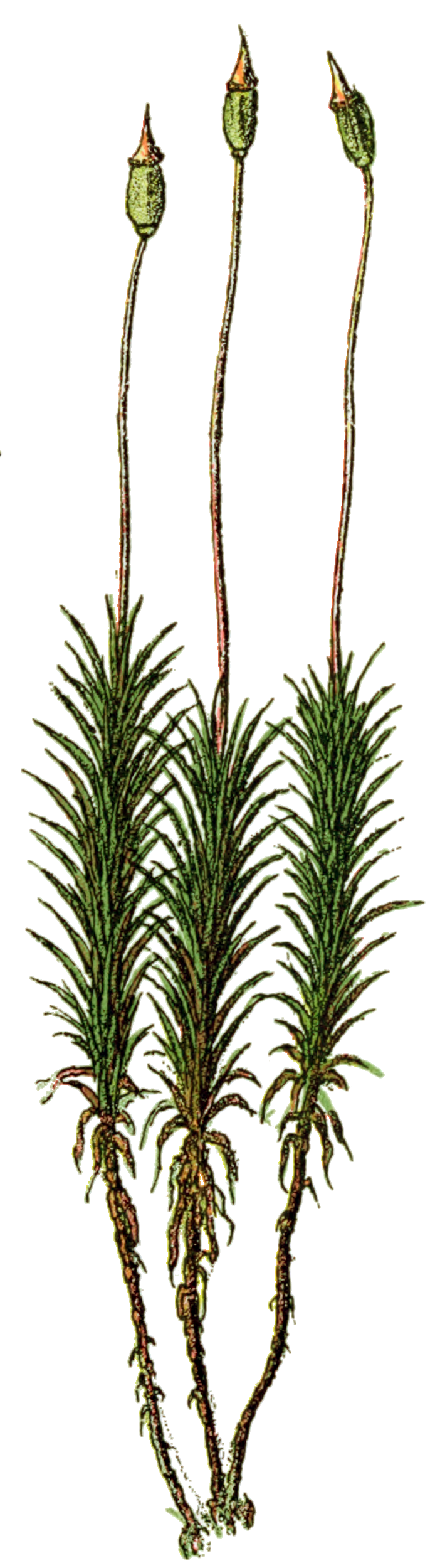
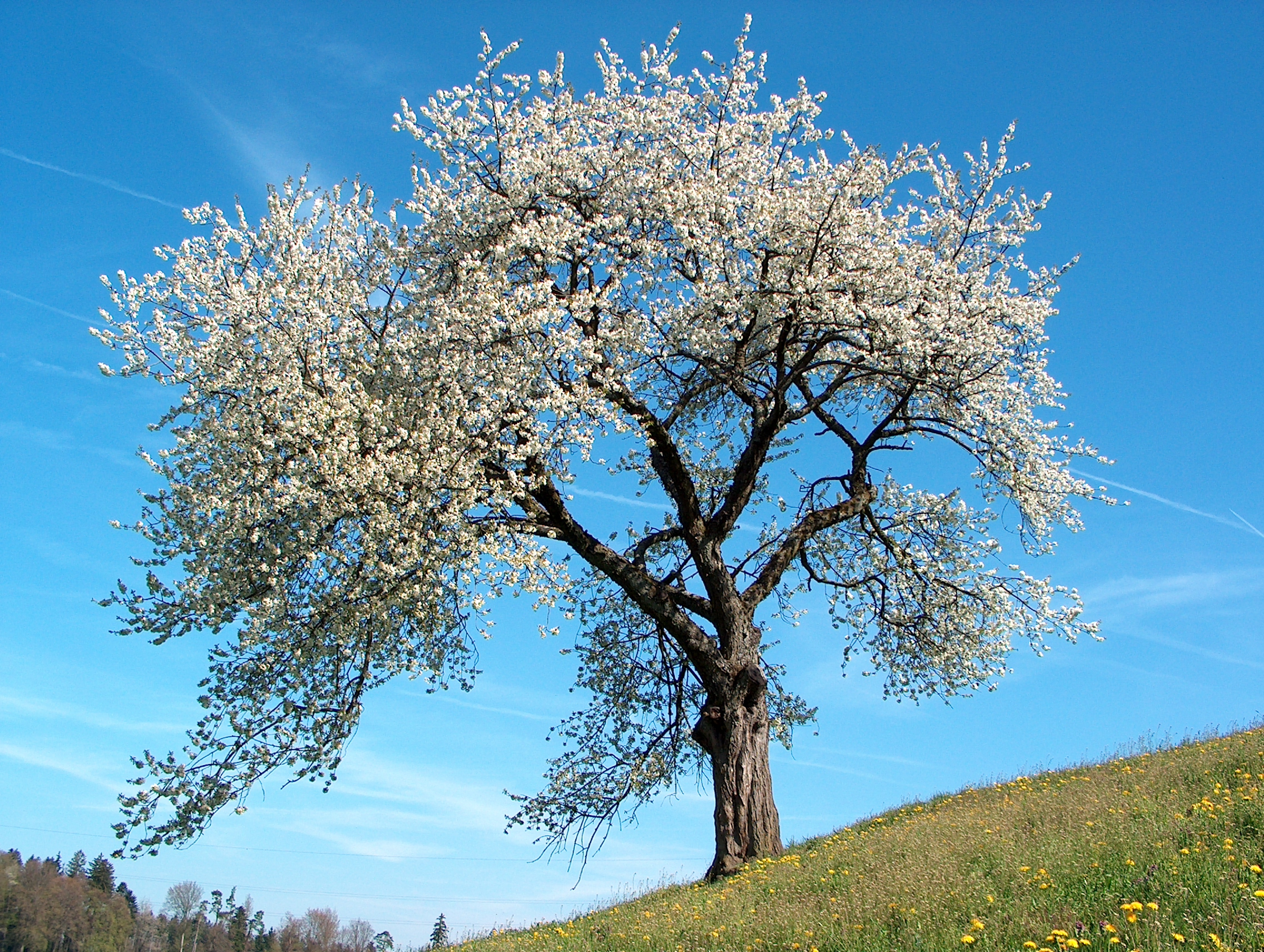
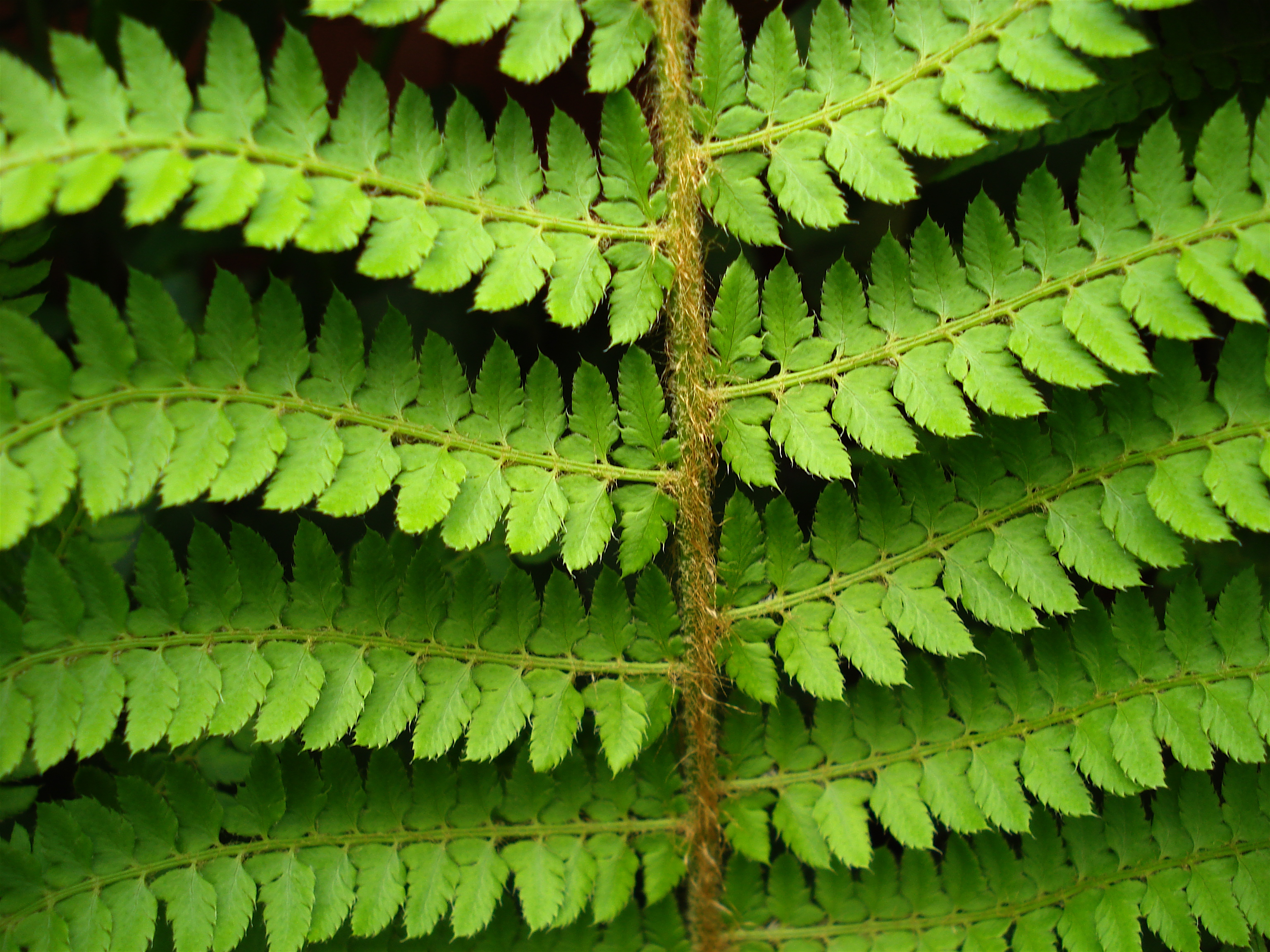
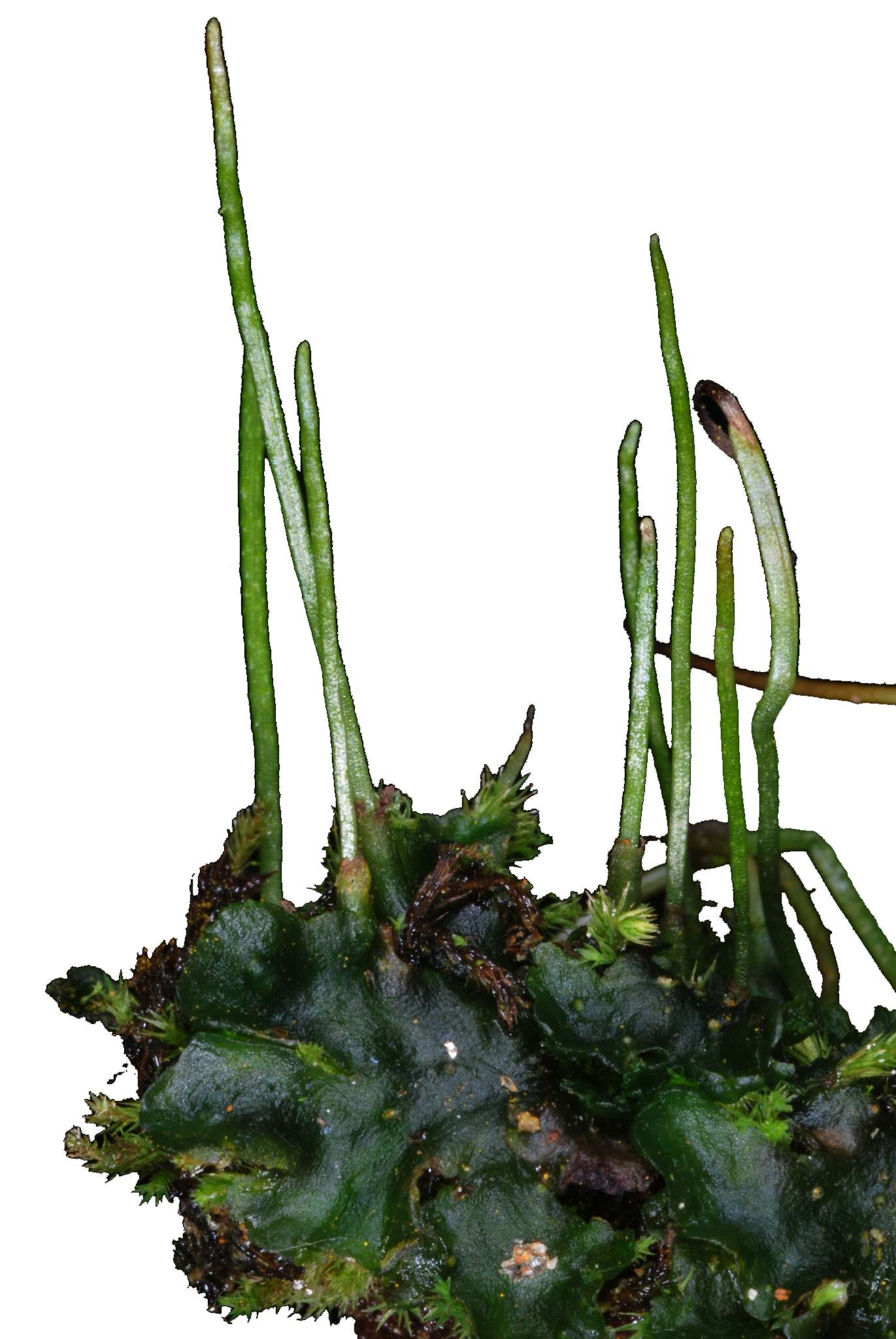
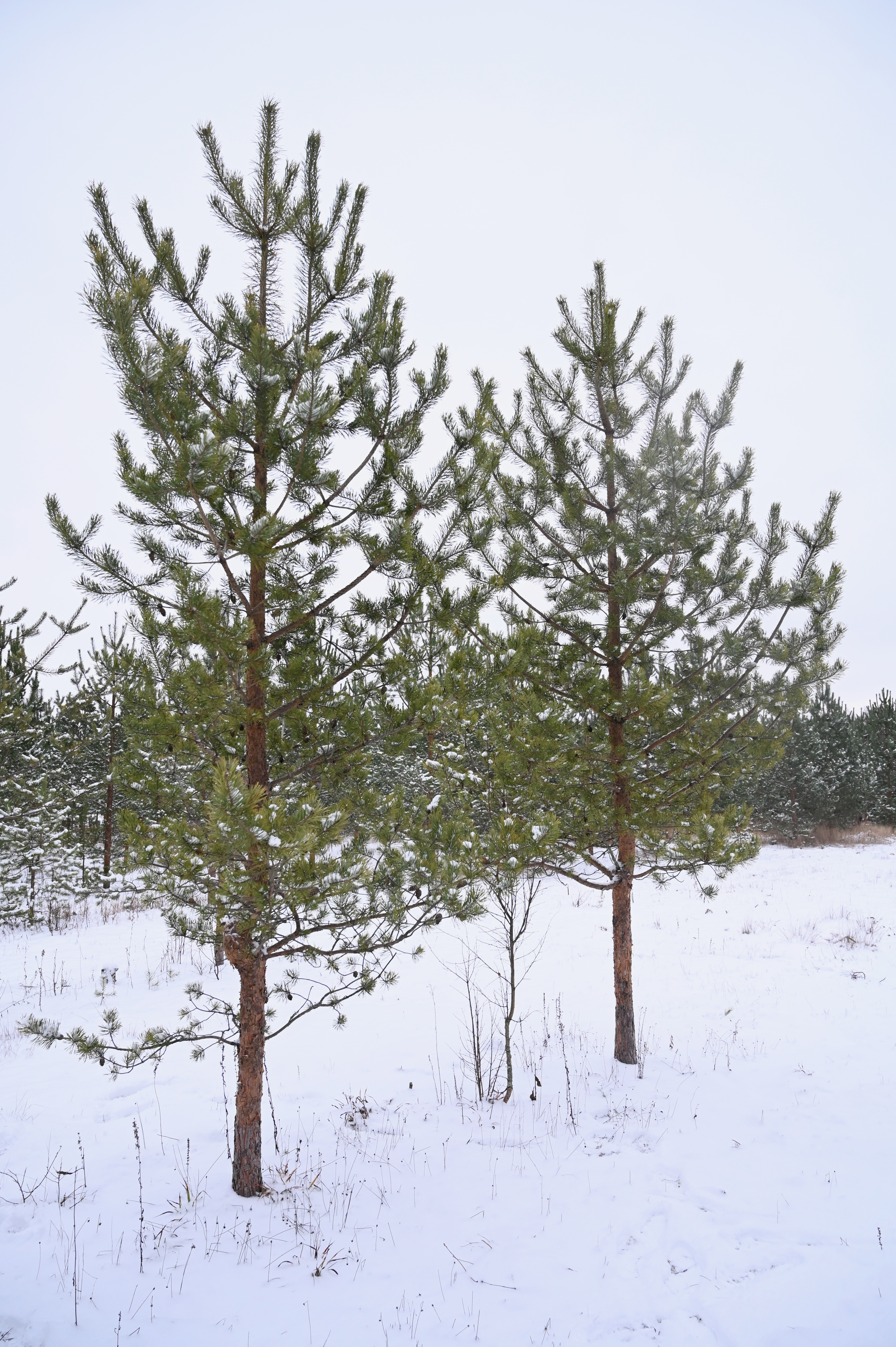
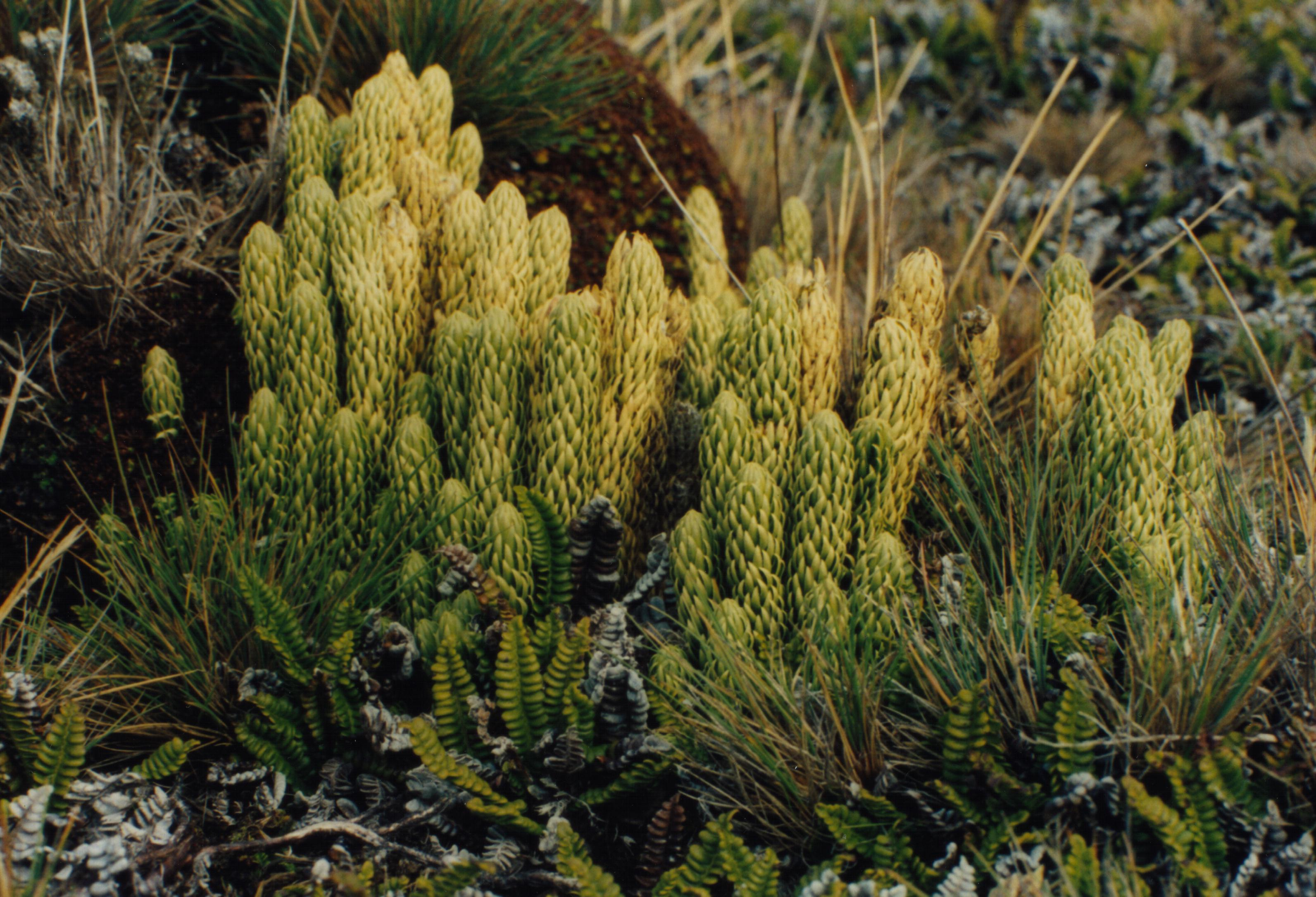
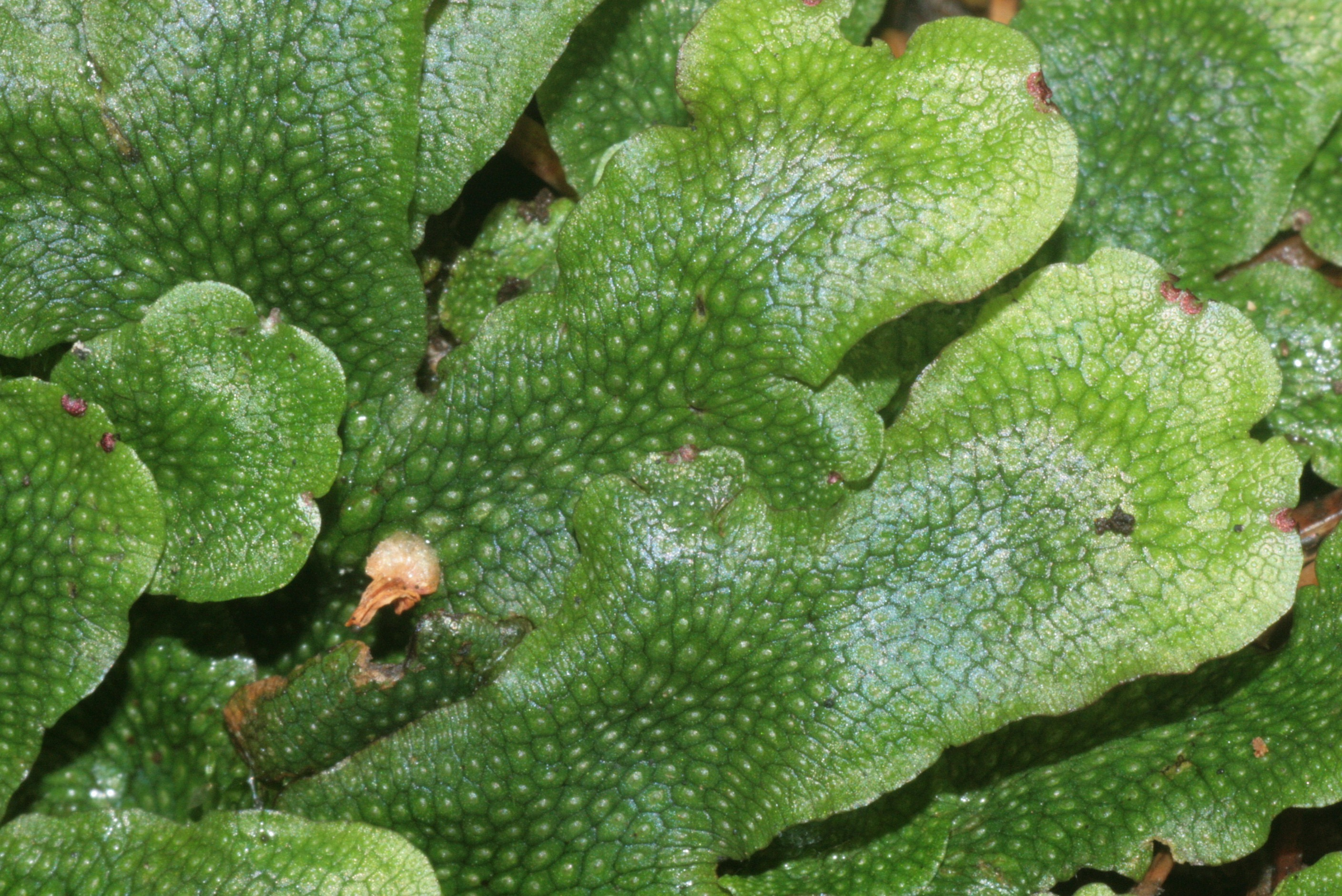
- Moss Angiosperm Fern Hornwort Gymnosperm Lycophyte Liverwort

Scientific classification
- Domain: Eukaryota
- Supergroup: Archaeplastida
- Clade: Viridiplantae
- Clade: Phragmoplastophyta
- Clade: Embryophytes

Divisions
- Non-vascular land plants (bryophytes); Marchantiophyta – liverworts; Bryophyta – mosses; Anthocerotophyta – hornworts; †Horneophytopsida; Vascular plants (tracheophytes); †Rhyniophyta – rhyniophytes; †Zosterophyllophyta – zosterophylls; Lycopodiophyta – clubmosses; †Trimerophytophyta – trimerophytes; Polypodiophyta – ferns and horsetails; †Progymnospermophyta; Seed plants (spermatophytes); †Pteridospermatophyta – seed ferns; Gymnospermae; Pinophyta – conifers, gnetae; Cycadophyta – cycads; Ginkgophyta – ginkgo; Angiospermae – flowering plants; Traditional groups: Bryophyta; Pteridophyta *; Gymnospermae; Angiospermae

Synonyms
- Cormophyta Endlicher, 1836; Phyta Barkley, 1939; Cormobionta Rothmaler, 1948; Euplanta Barkley, 1949; Telomobionta Takhtajan, 1964; Embryobionta Cronquist et al. 1966; Metaphyta Whittaker, 1969; Plantae Margulis, 1971

= Embryophyte =

Land plants Temporal range: Mid Ordovician–Present (potential Cambrian origin)

Subclade of green plants, also known as land plants

The embryophytes (/ˈɛmbriəˌfaɪts/) are plants of the clade Embryophyta (/ˌɛmbriˈɒfətə, -oʊˈfaɪtə/), also known as Plantae sensu strictissimo (/pˈlænteɪ ˈsɛ.sʊs strɪkˈtɪs.sɪ.moʊ/, "plant in the strictest sense") or land plants. They are complex multicellular eukaryotes with haplodiplontic life cycles. All have specialized reproductive organs called sporangia, and reproduce sexually via alternation of generations using spores or seeds. The name "embryophyte" derives from their innovative characteristic of nurturing the embryonic sporophytes within the tissues of the parent gametophytes during the early stages of multicellular development. They are the dominant group of autotrophs that make up the vegetation on Earth's terrestrial and wetland ecosystems, and represent the quintessential concept of "plants" most familiar to the common knowledge. The study of embryophytes is called phytology.

Embryophytes consist of the relatively species-poor non-vascular plants and the much more species-rich vascular plants (tracheophytes). The former are soft-bodied groundcovers that include three divisions of bryophytes, namely Bryophyta (mosses), Marchantiophyta (liverworts) and Anthocerotophyta (hornworts); while the latter are vertical-growing "higher plants" with lignified stem, absorptive roots and stomatous leaves, which include all extant polysporangiates such as lycophytes (clubmosses, firmosses, spikemosses and quillworts), polypodiophytes (ferns), gymnosperms (conifers, cycads, gnetophytes and ginkgo) and angiosperms (flowering plants). Since their boom during the mid/late Cretaceous, angiosperms have been the dominant group of embryophytes.

Embryophytes are predominantly a terrestrial chloroplastidian clade that shared a common ancestry with freshwater green algae, having emerged within the Phragmoplastophyta clade of charophyte algae as a sister clade of Charophyceae, Coleochaetophyceae and Zygnematophyceae. They are informally called "land plants" because they have evolved to thrive primarily in the drier environment of upland areas above the high water marks (although some members having evolved secondarily to live once again in semiaquatic/aquatic habitats), while the closely related green algae are primarily aquatic and depend heavily on waterbodies to thrive.

With very few exceptions, embryophytes are photoautotrophic and obtain metabolic biological energy by photosynthesis, using chlorophyll a and b to harvest light energy from sunlight for carbon fixation in order to synthesize carbohydrates, while releasing oxygen as a byproduct. This primary production is the foundation of terrestrial food webs, where biomass and energy are introduced into the food chain via herbivory and detritivory.

The proliferation of land plants also had profound impacts on the Earth's oxygen cycle, carbon cycle, water cycle and climate variation as well as significant (sometimes permanent) alterations to the Earth's crust (creating an organic pedosphere by eroding the lithosphere), surface hydrology and hydrochemistry, since the land proliferation of plants during the mid-Paleozoic. There was a well-defined, stepwise oxygenation of Earth's atmosphere from about 2-11% atm during the Cambrian to mid-Ordovician and around 13% atm during early Silurian, to near modern-day levels (1 atm, about 21% mole fraction) in the Devonian and a peak of over 1.6 atm (around 35% mole fraction) during the late Carboniferous and most of the Permian periods, coinciding with (and likely directly caused by) the progressive radiation and terrestrial dispersal of embryophytes (especially vascular plants).

The carbon sequestration by land plants, particularly by the expansive Carboniferous coal forests, were responsible for the Late Paleozoic icehouse and also the proven reserves of coal and coal seam gas that have been important to humanity's energy economy since the Industrial Revolution.

== Description ==
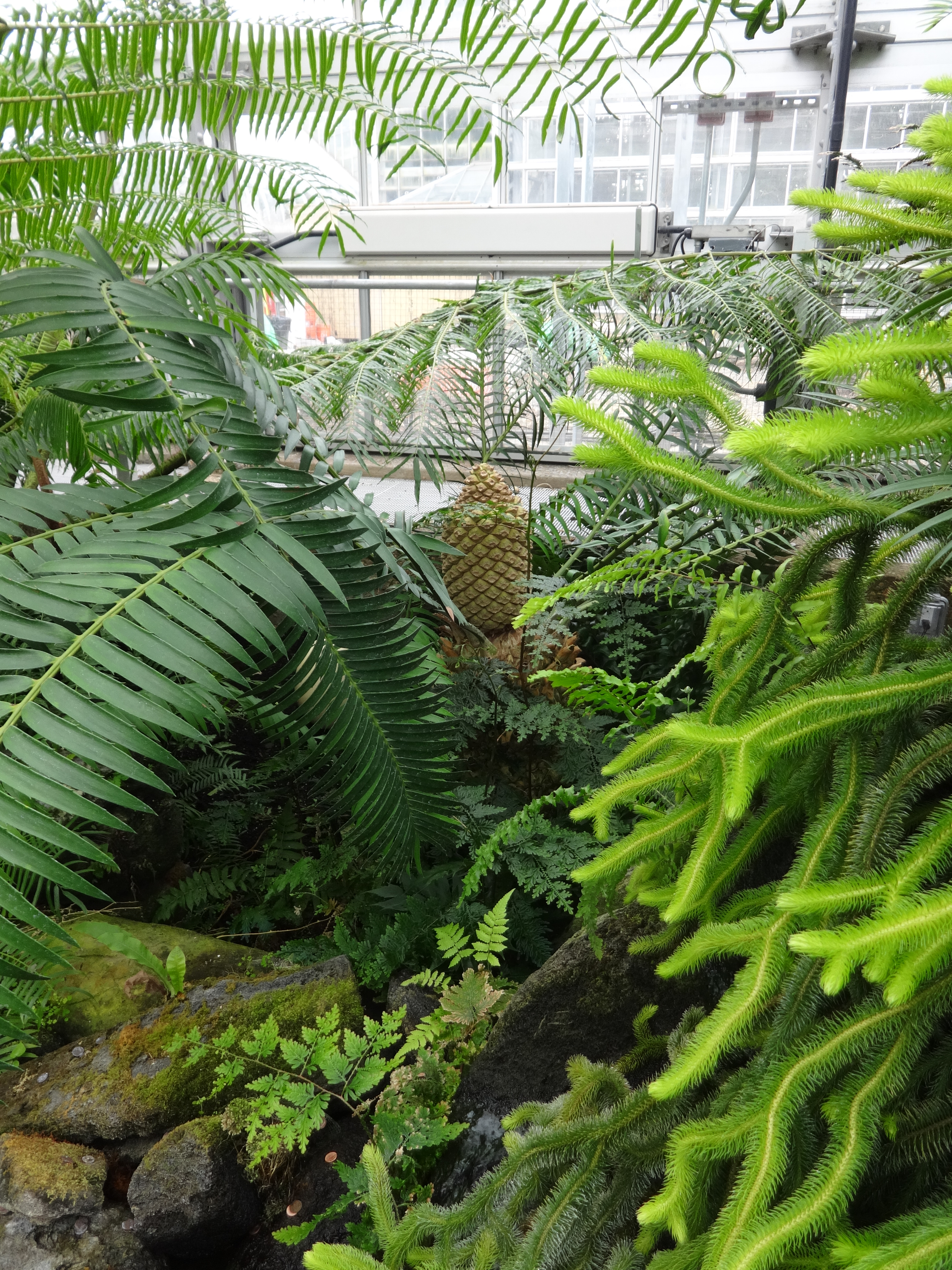
Moss, clubmoss, ferns and cycads in a greenhouse

The ancestors of embryophytes diverged from other green algae either a half-billion years ago, at some time in the interval between the mid-Cambrian and early Ordovician, or almost a billion years ago, during the Tonian or Cryogenian. They probably emerged from multicellular charophytes, a clade of freshwater green algae similar to extant Klebsormidiophyceae. The emergence of embryophytes and subsequent proliferation on land, where they have access to significantly more direct sunlight and carbon dioxide (CO_{2}), led to overall increased carbon fixation and sequestration by Earth's biosphere and depleted atmospheric CO_{2} (a greenhouse gas), causing (or at least contributing significantly) to global cooling, and thereby precipitating in the Late Paleozoic glaciations. Embryophytes are primarily adapted for life on land, although some are secondarily aquatic. Accordingly, they are often called land plants or terrestrial plants.

On a microscopic level, the cells of charophytes are broadly similar to those of chlorophyte green algae, but differ in that in cell division the daughter nuclei are separated by a phragmoplast. They are eukaryotic, with a cell wall composed of cellulose and plastids surrounded by two membranes. The latter include chloroplasts, which conduct photosynthesis and store food in the form of starch, and are characteristically pigmented with chlorophylls a and b, generally giving them a bright green color. Embryophyte cells also generally have an enlarged central vacuole enclosed by a vacuolar membrane or tonoplast, which maintains cell turgor and keeps the plant rigid.

In common with all groups of multicellular algae they have a life cycle which involves alternation of generations. A multicellular haploid generation with a single set of chromosomes – the gametophyte – produces sperm and eggs which fuse and grow into a diploid multicellular generation with twice the number of chromosomes – the sporophyte which produces haploid spores at maturity. The spores divide repeatedly by mitosis and grow into a gametophyte, thus completing the cycle. Embryophytes have two features related to their reproductive cycles which distinguish them from all other plant lineages. Firstly, their gametophytes produce sperm and eggs in multicellular structures (called "antheridia" and "archegonia"), and fertilization of the ovum takes place within the archegonium rather than in the external environment. Secondly, the initial stage of development of the fertilized egg (the zygote) into a diploid multicellular sporophyte, takes place within the archegonium where it is both protected and provided with nutrition. This second feature is the origin of the term "embryophyte" – the fertilized egg develops into a protected embryo, rather than dispersing as a single cell. In the bryophytes the sporophyte remains dependent on the gametophyte, while in all other embryophytes the sporophyte generation is dominant and capable of independent existence.

Embryophytes also differ from algae by having metamers. Metamers are repeated units of development, in which each unit derives from a single cell, but the resulting product tissue or part is largely the same for each cell. The whole organism is thus constructed from similar, repeating parts or metamers. Accordingly, these plants are sometimes termed 'metaphytes' and classified as the group Metaphyta (but Haeckel's definition of Metaphyta places some algae in this group). In all land plants a disc-like structure called a phragmoplast forms where the cell will divide, a trait only found in the land plants in the streptophyte lineage, some species within their relatives Coleochaetales, Charales and Zygnematales, as well as within subaerial species of the algae order Trentepohliales, and appears to be essential in the adaptation towards a terrestrial life style.

== Evolution ==
The green algae and land plants form a clade, the Viridiplantae. According to molecular clock estimates, the Viridiplantae split 1,200 million years ago to 725 million years ago into two clades: chlorophytes and streptophytes. The chlorophytes, with around 700 genera, were originally marine algae, although some groups have since spread into fresh water. The streptophyte algae (i.e. excluding the land plants) have around 122 genera; they adapted to fresh water very early in their evolutionary history and have not spread back into marine environments.

Some time during the Ordovician, streptophytes invaded the land and began the evolution of the embryophyte land plants. Present day embryophytes form a clade. Becker and Marin speculate that land plants evolved from streptophytes because living in fresh water pools pre-adapted them to tolerate a range of environmental conditions found on land, such as exposure to rain, tolerance of temperature variation, high levels of ultra-violet light, and seasonal dehydration.

The preponderance of molecular evidence as of 2006 suggested that the groups making up the embryophytes are related as shown in the cladogram below (based on Qiu et al. 2006 with additional names from Crane et al. 2004).

- Living embryophytes
  - Liverworts
  - - Mosses
    - - Hornworts
      - Tracheophytes
        - Lycophytes
        - Euphyllophytes
          - Polypodiophytes
            (ferns and horsetails)
          - Spermatophytes
            - Angiosperms (flowering plants)
            - Gymnosperms

An updated phylogeny of Embryophytes based on the work by Novíkov & Barabaš-Krasni 2015 and Hao and Xue 2013 with plant taxon authors from Anderson, Anderson & Cleal 2007 and some additional clade names. Puttick et al./Nishiyama et al. are used for the basal clades.

- Embryophytes
  - Bryophyta
    - Anthocerotophytina (Hornworts)
    - Setaphyta
      - Bryophytina (Mosses)
      - Marchantiophytina (Liverworts)
  - Polysporangiomorpha
    - †Horneophytopsida [Protracheophytes]
    - Tracheophytina
      - †Cooksoniaceae
      - - †Aglaophyton
        - - †Rhyniopsida
          - - †Catenalis
            - - †Aberlemnia
              - - †Hsuaceae
                - - †Renaliaceae
                  - Eutracheophytes
                    - - †Adoketophyton
                      - †?Barinophytopsida
                      - †Zosterophyllopsida
                    - - Microphylls
                        - †Hicklingia
                        - - †Gumuia
                          - - †Nothia
                            - - Lycopodiopsida (Clubmosses, Spikemosses & Quillworts)
                              - †Zosterophyllum deciduum
                      - - †Yunia
                        - Euphyllophytes
                          - †Eophyllophyton
                          - - †Trimerophytopsida
                            - Megaphylls
                              - Moniliformopses
                                - †Ibyka
                                - - †Pauthecophyton
                                  - - †Cladoxylopsida
                                    - Polypodiopsida (ferns)
                              - Radiatopses
                                - †Celatheca
                                - - †Pertica
                                  - Lignophytes
                                    - †Progymnosperms
                                      (paraphyletic)
                                    - Spermatophytes (seed plants)

== Diversity ==
=== Non-vascular land plants ===
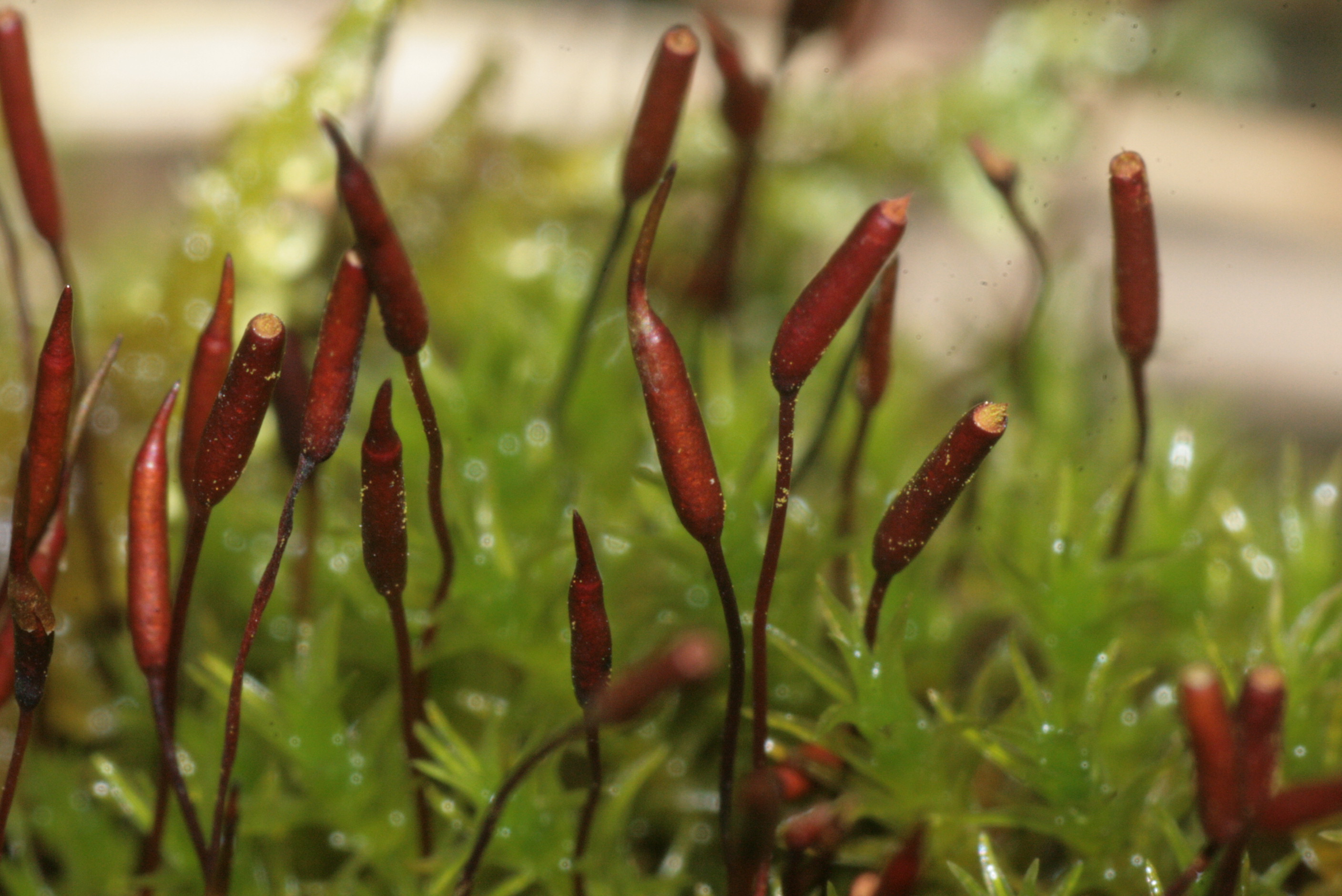
Bryophytes, such as these mosses, produce unbranched, stalked sporophytes from which their spores are released.

The non-vascular land plants, namely the mosses (Bryophyta), hornworts (Anthocerotophyta), and liverworts (Marchantiophyta), are relatively small plants, often confined to environments that are humid or at least seasonally moist. They are limited by their reliance on water needed to disperse their gametes; a few are truly aquatic. Most are tropical, but there are many arctic species. They may locally dominate the ground cover in tundra and Arctic–alpine habitats or the epiphyte flora in rain forest habitats.

They are usually studied together because of their many similarities. All three groups share a haploid-dominant (gametophyte) life cycle and unbranched sporophytes (the plant's diploid generation). These traits appear to be common to all early diverging lineages of non-vascular plants on the land. Their life-cycle is strongly dominated by the haploid gametophyte generation. The sporophyte remains small and dependent on the parent gametophyte for its entire brief life. All other living groups of land plants have a life cycle dominated by the diploid sporophyte generation. It is in the diploid sporophyte that vascular tissue develops. In some ways, the term "non-vascular" is a misnomer. Some mosses and liverworts do produce a special type of vascular tissue composed of complex water-conducting cells. However, this tissue differs from that of "vascular" plants in that these water-conducting cells are not lignified. It is unlikely that the water-conducting cells in mosses are homologous with the vascular tissue in "vascular" plants.

Like the vascular plants, they have differentiated stems, and although these are most often no more than a few centimeters tall, they provide mechanical support. Most have leaves, although these typically are one cell thick and lack veins. They lack true roots or any deep anchoring structures. Some species grow a filamentous network of horizontal stems, but these have a primary function of mechanical attachment rather than extraction of soil nutrients (Palaeos 2008).

=== Rise of vascular plants ===
Reconstruction of a plant of Rhynia

During the Silurian and Devonian periods (around 440 to 360 million years ago), plants evolved which possessed true vascular tissue, including cells with walls strengthened by lignin (tracheids). Some extinct early plants appear to be between the grade of organization of bryophytes and that of true vascular plants (eutracheophytes). Genera such as Horneophyton have water-conducting tissue more like that of mosses, but a different life-cycle in which the sporophyte is branched and more developed than the gametophyte. Genera such as Rhynia have a similar life-cycle but have simple tracheids and so are a kind of vascular plant. It was assumed that the gametophyte dominant phase seen in bryophytes used to be the ancestral condition in terrestrial plants, and that the sporophyte dominant stage in vascular plants was a derived trait. However, the gametophyte and sporophyte stages were probably equally independent from each other, and that the mosses and vascular plants in that case are both derived, and have evolved in opposite directions.

During the Devonian period, vascular plants diversified and spread to many different land environments. In addition to vascular tissues which transport water throughout the body, tracheophytes have an outer layer or cuticle that resists drying out. The sporophyte is the dominant generation, and in modern species develops leaves, stems and roots, while the gametophyte remains very small.

=== Lycophytes and euphyllophytes ===
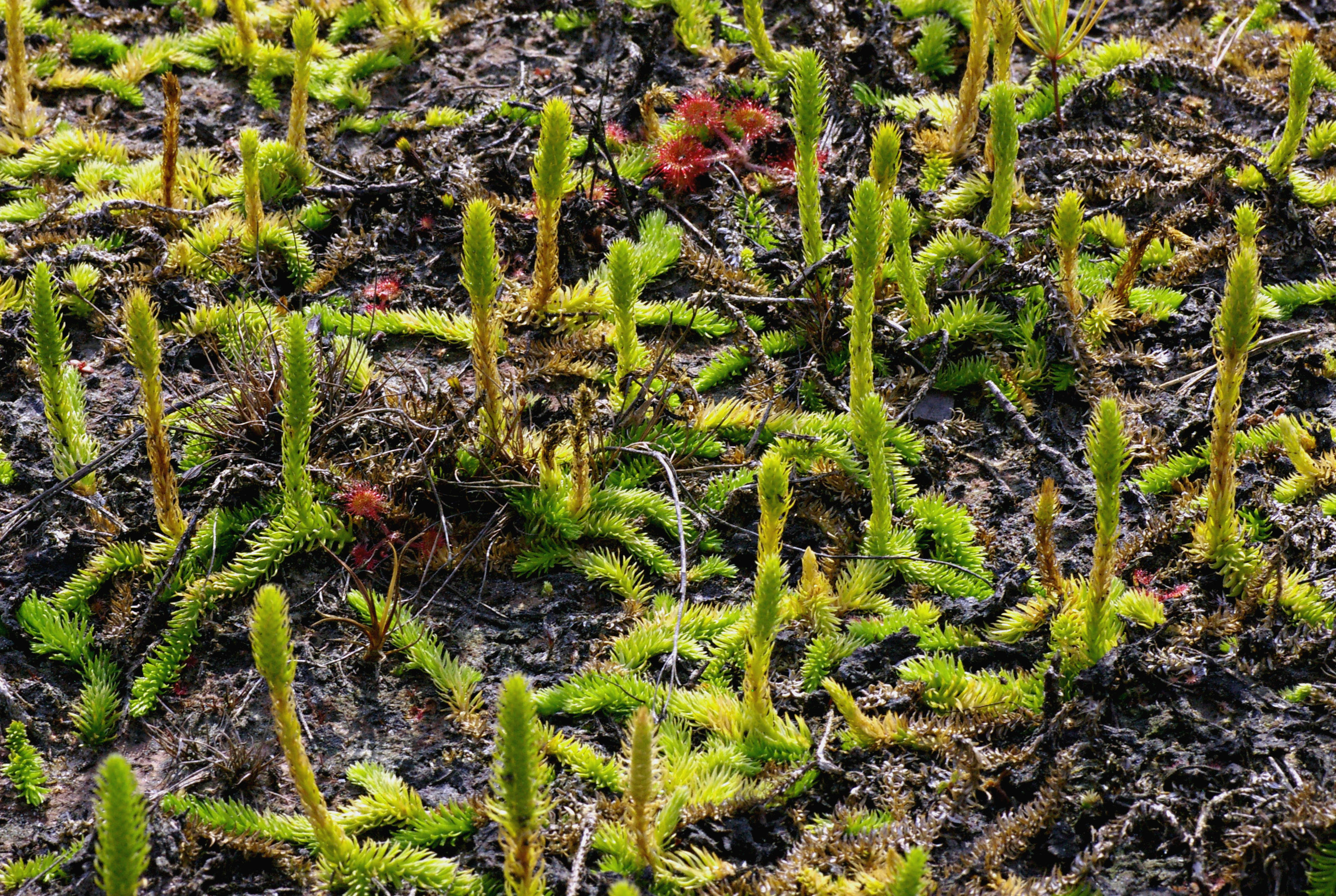
Lycopodiella inundata, a lycophyte

All the vascular plants which disperse through spores were once thought to be related (and were often grouped as 'ferns and allies'). However, recent research suggests that leaves evolved quite separately in two different lineages. The lycophytes or lycopodiophytes – modern clubmosses, spikemosses and quillworts – make up less than 1% of living vascular plants. They have small leaves, often called 'microphylls' or 'lycophylls', which are borne all along the stems in the clubmosses and spikemosses, and which effectively grow from the base, via an intercalary meristem. It is believed that microphylls evolved from outgrowths on stems, such as spines, which later acquired veins (vascular traces).

Although the living lycophytes are all relatively small and inconspicuous plants, more common in the moist tropics than in temperate regions, during the Carboniferous period tree-like lycophytes (such as Lepidodendron) formed huge forests that dominated the landscape.

The euphyllophytes, making up more than 99% of living vascular plant species, have large 'true' leaves (megaphylls), which effectively grow from the sides or the apex, via marginal or apical meristems. One theory is that megaphylls evolved from three-dimensional branching systems by first 'planation' – flattening to produce a two dimensional branched structure – and then 'webbing' – tissue growing out between the flattened branches. Others have questioned whether megaphylls evolved in the same way in different groups.

=== Ferns and horsetails ===
The ferns and horsetails (the Polypodiophyta) form a clade; they use spores as their main method of dispersal. Traditionally, whisk ferns and horsetails were historically treated as distinct from 'true' ferns. Living whisk ferns and horsetails do not have the large leaves (megaphylls) which would be expected of euphyllophytes. This has probably resulted from reduction, as evidenced by early fossil horsetails, in which the leaves are broad with branching veins.

Ferns are a large and diverse group, with some 12,000 species. A stereotypical fern has broad, much divided leaves, which grow by unrolling.

=== Seed plants ===
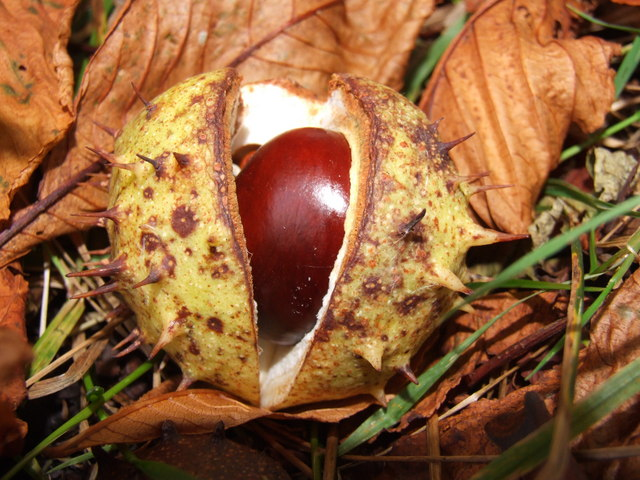
Large seed of horse chestnut, Aesculus hippocastanum

Seed plants, which first appeared in the fossil record towards the end of the Paleozoic era, reproduce using desiccation-resistant capsules called seeds. Starting from a plant which disperses by spores, highly complex changes are needed to produce seeds. The sporophyte has two kinds of spore-forming organs or sporangia. One kind, the megasporangium, produces only a single large spore, a megaspore. This sporangium is surrounded by sheathing layers or integuments which form the seed coat. Within the seed coat, the megaspore develops into a tiny gametophyte, which in turn produces one or more egg cells. Before fertilization, the sporangium and its contents plus its coat is called an ovule; after fertilization a seed. In parallel to these developments, the other kind of sporangium, the microsporangium, produces microspores. A tiny gametophyte develops inside the wall of a microspore, producing a pollen grain. Pollen grains can be physically transferred between plants by the wind or animals, most commonly insects. Pollen grains can also transfer to an ovule of the same plant, either with the same flower or between two flowers of the same plant (self-fertilization). When a pollen grain reaches an ovule, it enters via a microscopic gap in the coat, the micropyle. The tiny gametophyte inside the pollen grain then produces sperm cells which move to the egg cell and fertilize it. Seed plants include two clades with living members, the gymnosperms and the angiosperms or flowering plants. In gymnosperms, the ovules or seeds are not further enclosed. In angiosperms, they are enclosed within the carpel. Angiosperms typically also have other, secondary structures, such as petals, which together form a flower.

Meiosis in sexual land plants provides a direct mechanism for repairing DNA in reproductive tissues. Sexual reproduction appears to be needed for maintaining long-term genomic integrity and only infrequent combinations of extrinsic and intrinsic factors allow for shifts to asexuality.

== Bibliography ==
- Raven, P.H.; Evert, R.F. & Eichhorn, S.E. (2005), Biology of Plants (7th ed.), New York: W.H. Freeman, ISBN 978-0-7167-1007-3
- Stewart, W.N. & Rothwell, G.W. (1993), Paleobotany and the Evolution of Plants (2nd ed.), Cambridge: Cambridge University Press, ISBN 978-0-521-38294-6
- Taylor, T.N.; Taylor, E.L. & Krings, M. (2009), Paleobotany, The Biology and Evolution of Fossil Plants (2nd ed.), Amsterdam; Boston: Academic Press, ISBN 978-0-12-373972-8
