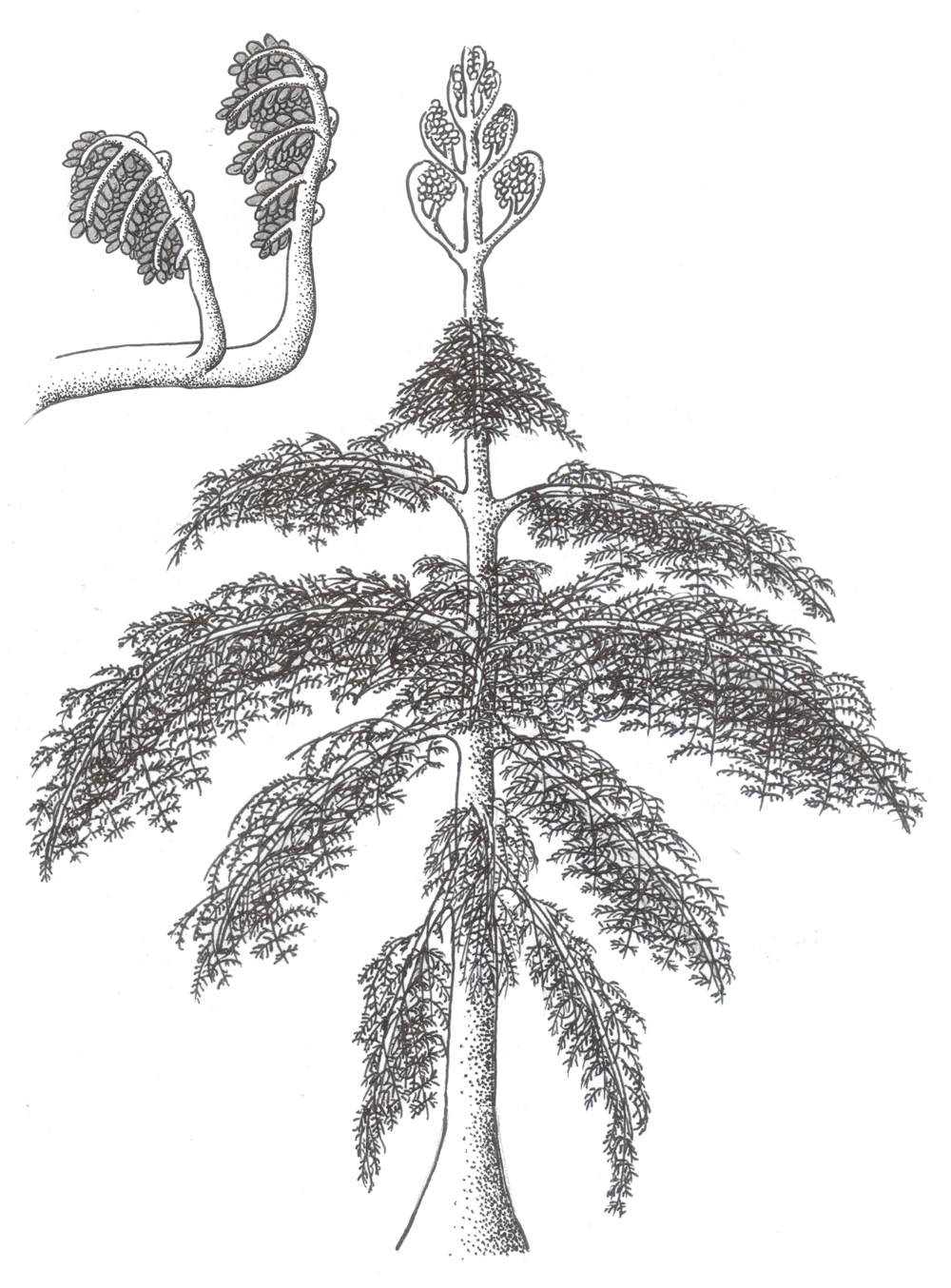
- Reconstruction

Scientific classification
- Kingdom: Plantae
- Clade: Tracheophytes
- Class: †Progymnospermopsida
- Order: †Aneurophytales
- Family: †Aneurophytaceae
- Genus: †Tetraxylopteris; C.B.Beck (1957)

Species
- T. schmidtii C.B.Beck (1957); T. reposana Hammond & Berry (2005)

= Tetraxylopteris =

Tetraxylopteris Temporal range: Middle Devonian–Upper Devonian

Extinct genus of vascular plants

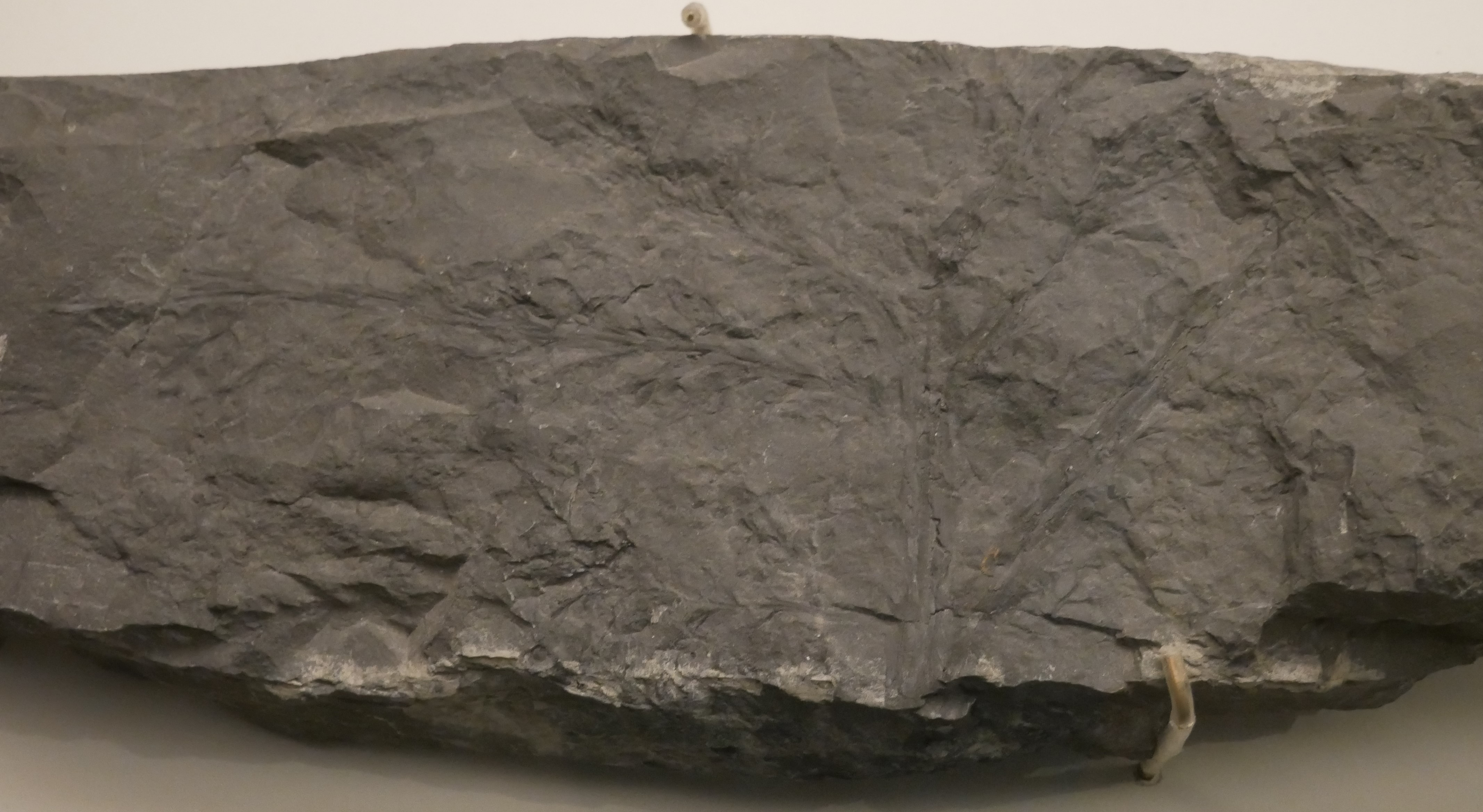
Tetraxylopteris sp. fossil

Tetraxylopteris is a genus of extinct vascular plants of the Middle to Upper Devonian (around 390 to 360 million years ago). Fossils were first found in New York State, USA. A second species was later found in Venezuela.

== Description ==
Fossils of Tetraxylopteris have so far been discovered in two locations. T. schmidtii was named from the Catskill Clastic Wedge, New York State, United States of America, in rocks of Middle to Upper Devonian age (around 390 to 360 million years ago). T. reposana was found in the Campo Chico Formation, north-west Venezuela, in beds believed to be of Frasnian age (382 to 372 million years ago).

Branching pattern of sterile branches of Tetraxylopteris reposana, based on Hammond & Berry 2005. 0=main or side stem; 1=1st order branch, etc.; a=appendage. Appendages shown only on one 3rd order branch.

The overall shape of Tetraxylopteris consisted of a complex system of branches. The main stem was 'pseudomonopodial', i.e. it divided dichotomously to produce side stems while the main stem maintained its identity. The main and side stems then bore three orders of branches (i.e. the first branches from the stems divided twice more). (There were possibly four orders in T. reposana.) The branches were arranged in opposite pairs with successive pairs at right angles (decussate). In T. schmidtii, the final order of branches bore appendages arranged oppositely and decussately; in T. reposana, the appendages were opposite and decussate on the penultimate order of branches and spirally or helically arranged on the final order. The appendages branched dichotomously up to three times and were three-dimensional, although some appear flattened in the fossilized specimens. They have been called "non-laminate proto-leaves" by Beerling and Fleming, reflecting the belief that such structures were precursors to true leaves, which evolved by first 'planation' – flattening to produce a two-dimensional branched structure – and then 'webbing' – tissue growing out between the flattened branches.

One consistent difference between the two species is that T. schmidtii had branches which very distinctly narrowed along their length whereas only the third order branches of T. reposana showed any tapering. Another is that T. reposana had swellings at the bases of first and second order branches.

In both species, the primary xylem strand was central to stems, branches and appendages. In the main stems and branches it was X-shaped in cross-section, corresponding to the four rows of branches. In the final appendages it became circular in cross-section. The xylem development was 'mesarch', i.e. the first maturing protoxylem had later maturing metaxylem on either side. Protoxylem occurred both at the tips of the lobes of the xylem strand and in the centre. The general anatomy of the woody stem resembles that of seed plants.

The spore-forming organs or sporangia of Tetraxylopteris were born on a very complex 'fertile branching system'. Firstly the main axis of the system branched twice dichotomously. Then each of the four resulting branches was three times pinnate. Each ultimate unit had an elongated sporangium at its end which split longitudinally to release the spores which were trilete, ranging from around 70 to 170 μm in diameter.

The complex three-dimensional branching pattern implies that both species would have been open bushy plants. The exact height cannot be determined from the fossils, which consist of broken-off portions. The longest known section of T. schmidtii is 50 cm – rather less for T. reposana, which may nevertheless have been the taller species. An overall height of a few metres has been proposed. Hammond and Berry suggest that T. reposana may have grown in dense thickets so that plants supported one another.

== Taxonomy ==
The genus was created by Beck in 1957 for the species Tetraxylopteris schmidtii. Initially Beck described the genus as possibly a precursor to the seed ferns or pteridosperms. In 1960, Beck created the name Progymnospermopsida for a class of plants which reproduced in a similar way to ferns, but had stems whose internal structure resembled gymnosperms. The class was divided into two orders, the more 'primitive' Aneurophytales and the more 'advanced' Archaeopteridales. (The former order had earlier been proposed by Kräusel & Weyland in 1941 for taxa ancestral to both ferns and pteridosperms.) Tetraxylopteris was placed in the Aneurophytales. Another specimen from the same location was initially described as Sphenoxylon, but was later shown to be a poorly preserved stem of Tetraxylopteris.

In 2005 a further species, Tetraxylopteris reposana, was described by Hammond and Berry. The specific epithet reposana is derived from 'El Reposo', the name of the hacienda near the fossil locality. Hammond and Berry suggest that Proteokalon Scheckler & Banks (1971) may be synonymous with Tetraxylopteris.

Hammond and Berry agree with Beck on the systematic taxonomy of the genus.

Class Progymnospermopsida Beck (1960)

Order Aneurophytales Kräusel & Weyland (1941)

Genus Tetraxylopteris Beck (1957)

== Phylogeny ==
A cladogram published in 2004 by Crane et al. places Tetraxylopteris in a paraphyletic stem group, basal to the seed plants (spermatophytes). It is grouped with Pertica, traditionally classified as a "trimerophyte" rather than a progymnosperm like Tetraxylopteris.

- euphyllophytes
  - † Eophyllophyton
  - - † basal groups (Psilophyton crenulatum, Ps. dawsonii)
    - - moniliforms (ferns; extant and extinct members)
      - - † basal groups (Pertica, Tetraxylopteris)
        - spermatophytes (seed plants; extant and extinct members)

Other researchers have produced rather different analyses. Rothwell's analysis separates the "trimerophytes" and progymnosperms, with only the latter being closely related to seed plants.
