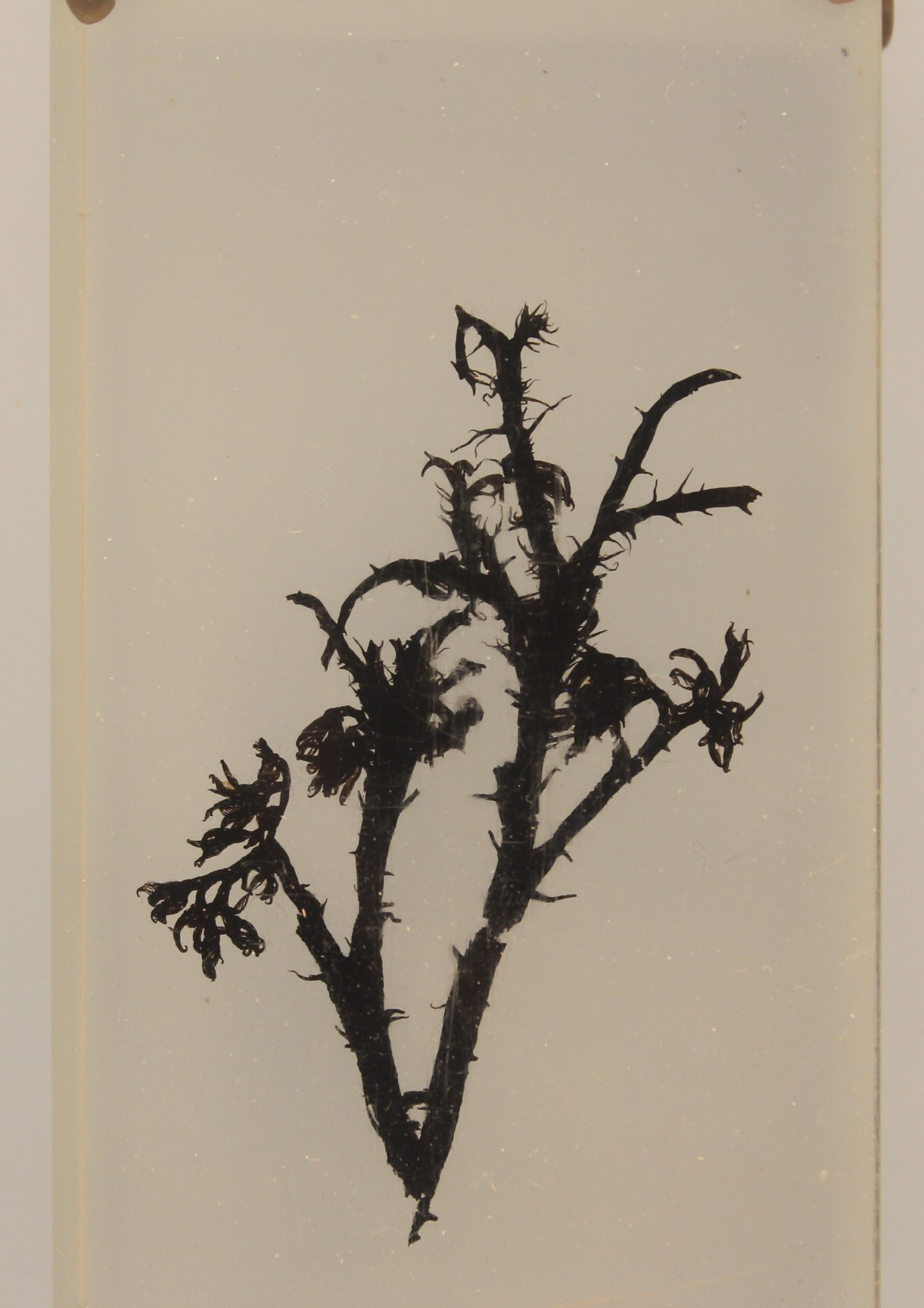
- Acid-prepared P. crenulatum, National Museum of Natural History

Scientific classification
- Kingdom: Plantae
- Clade: Tracheophytes
- Class: †Trimerophytopsida
- Order: †Trimerophytales
- Family: †Trimerophytaceae
- Genus: †Psilophyton; Dawson (1859) emend. Hueber & H.P.Banks (1967)

Type species
- Psilophyton princeps Dawson (1859)

Species
- P. burnotense (Gilkinet) Kräusel & Weyland; P. charientos Gensel (1979); P. coniculum Trant & Gensel (1985); P. crenulatum Doran (1980); P. dapsile Kasper et al. (1974); P. dawsonii H.P.Banks et al. (1975); P. forbesii Andrews et al. (1968); P. genseliae Gerienne (1997); P. krauselii Obrhel (1959); P. microspinosum Kasper et al. (1974); P. parvulum Gerienne (1995); P. princeps Dawson (1859); P. primitivum Hao & Gensel (1998); P. szaferi Zdebska (1986)

= Psilophyton =

Psilophyton Temporal range: Early Devonian - Late Devonian

Genus of fossil plants

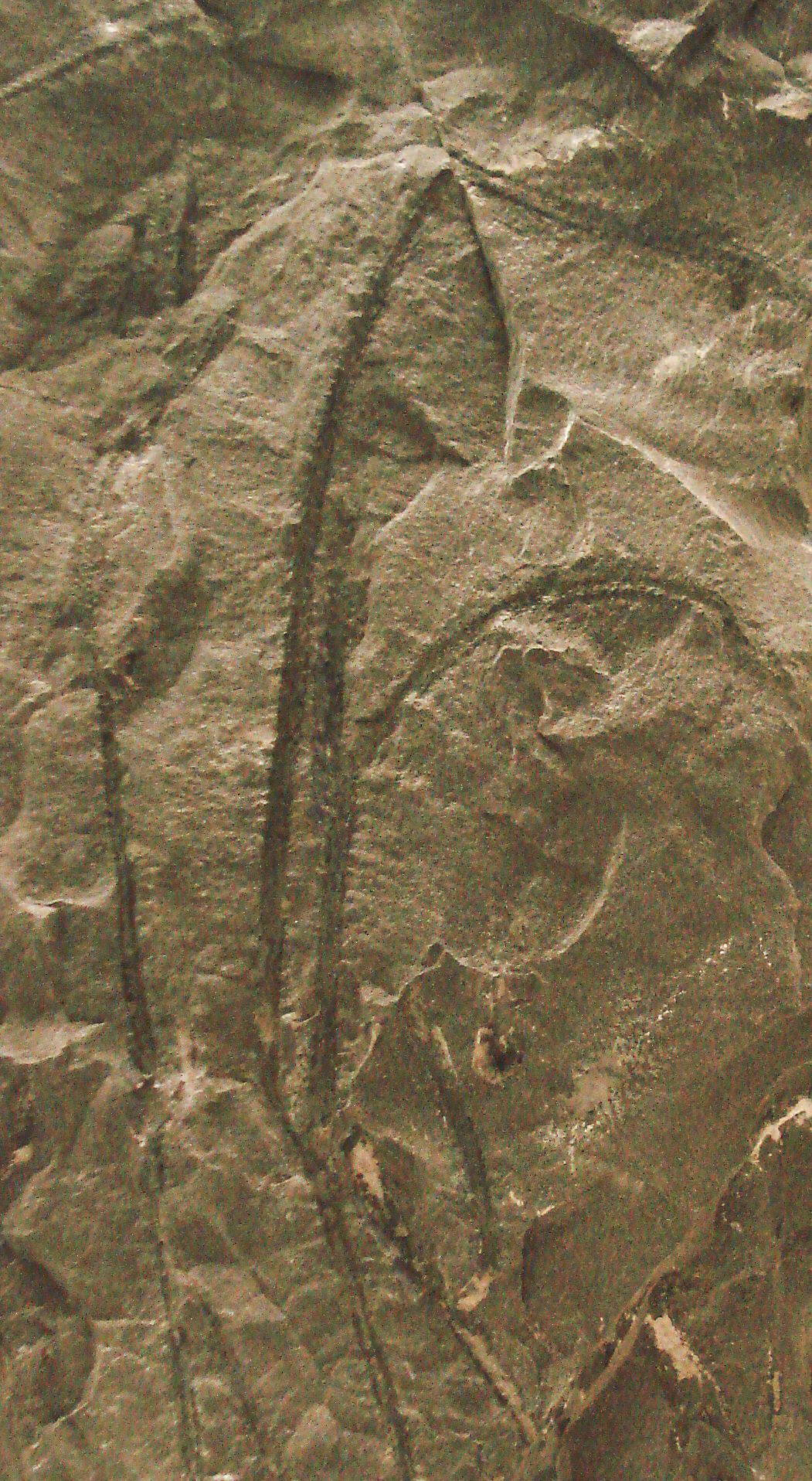
Fossil of Psilophyton dawsonii

Psilophyton is a genus of extinct vascular plants. Described in 1859, it was one of the first fossil plants to be found which was of Devonian age (about 420 to 360 million years ago). Specimens have been found in northern Maine, USA; Gaspé Bay, Quebec and New Brunswick, Canada; the Czech Republic; and Yunnan, China. Plants lacked leaves or true roots; spore-forming organs or sporangia were borne on the ends of branched clusters. It is significantly more complex than some other plants of comparable age (e.g. Rhynia) and is thought to be part of the group from within which the modern ferns and seed plants evolved.

== Description ==
Reconstruction of Psilophyton forbesii; scale bar = 5 cm

Almost all the species of Psilophyton have been found in rocks of Emsian age (around 411 to 393 million years ago). One exception is P. krauselii, from the Czech Republic, which is younger, being from the upper part of the Middle Devonian (around 390 to 380 million years ago).

Psilophyton dawsonii is the best-known species. Compressed and mineralized specimens have been found in several locations, particularly in calcareous pebbles on the Gaspé Peninsula, Quebec, Canada. Plants consisted of bare stems (axes) ending in blunt tips. Lower down they repeatedly branched dichotomously; higher up they bore sporangium-bearing 'units' in two rows on opposite sides of the stems. These units branched, also dichotomously, before terminating in sporangia, so that there were clusters of up to 128 paired, downward curved sporangia, oval in shape and about 5 mm long. Spores were released through a longitudinal slit. The first two branching points of the fertile units appear to have consisted of two closely spaced dichotomous branches in which the middle branch did not develop. The trilete spores were between 40 and 75 μm in diameter.

The internal structure of the stems of P. dawsonii was considerably more complex than that of other plants of a similar age, e.g. Rhynia. A central strand of xylem occupied up to a third of the diameter of the stem. In the lower parts of main stems it was circular, enlarging before it divided prior to dichotomous branching. Higher up it became elliptical in cross-section, corresponding to the two rows of fertile branching units. Within the branches of these units, the strand was more-or-less rectangular. The conducting elements of the xylem, the tracheids, were of the so-called 'P-type' in which the walls were strengthened by ladder-like (scalariform) bars with circular openings between them. The tissue around the central strand was multi-layered with open spaces below the stomata.

P. princeps, the first-discovered species, differed from P. dawsonii in having spines on the stems and larger sporangia. P. forbesii is the largest known species of Psilophyton. Reconstructions suggest a height of around 60 cm. Its stems were bare of spines but marked by longitudinal striations. Compared to P. dawsonii, both P. princeps and P. forbesii had a greater distinction between main stems and side branches, which may be considered an 'advanced' feature.

P. crenulatum was found in New Brunswick, Canada, also in rocks of Emsian age. Its branches bore spines up to 6 mm long which divided into two or three projections at their tips. It has resemblances to specimens of Aarabia, found in Morocco.

P. dapsile was found in Maine, USA. It appears to have been considerably smaller than the previous species, perhaps 30 cm tall, with smooth dichotomously branching stems, and sporangia only 2 mm long. Kasper et al. suggested that the smaller species P. dapsile and P. krauselii, which had mainly dichotomous branches, were the more 'primitive' members of the genus.

P. primitivum was found in Yunnan, China, in the Posongchong Formation, which is of Pragian (Siegenian) age (around 410 million years ago). All other species have been found in North America and Europe, which formed part of the continent of Laurussia in the Devonian. The name reflects a belief that the species is 'primitive', with considerable dichotomous branching and a loose, less tightly branched habit. As with all species of Psilophyton, pairs of sporangia were created by dichotomously branching fertile units, although in P. primitivum there were relatively few per unit (4–8) and they were somewhat loosely clustered. Similarities with P. microspinum and P. parvulum were suggested.

== Taxonomy ==
Leafless, dichotomously branching fossils bearing spines and possessing vascular tissue from the Devonian of Gaspé Peninsula, Canada, were thought by Dawson in 1859 to resemble the modern whiskfern, Psilotum. Accordingly, he named his new genus Psilophyton, the type species being P. princeps. Unfortunately, it later turned out that his description and subsequent reconstruction was based on fragments of three different unrelated plants, which caused confusion for many years. The sporangia were from Psilophyton, but some aerial stems were from what is now Sawdonia, and the rhizomes were from Taeniocrada.

In 1871, Dawson described specimens which had strong spines as P. princeps var. ornatum. He considered that groups of paired terminal sporangia found with these were part of the same plant, although no actual connection was found. Much later, in 1967, it was shown that fossils called "Psilophyton princeps" had two very different patterns of xylem development: from the centre outwards (centrarch) in P. princeps and from the outside inwards (exarch) in P. princeps var. ornatum. Hueber and Banks selected new specimens as the type for the species P. princeps, and Hueber later transferred P. princeps var. ornatum to a new genus as Sawdonia ornata. Only P. princeps had paired terminal sporangia; those of S. ornata were borne on the sides of the stems. Later additions of species to the genus have been based on the description by Hueber and Banks.

Dawson named another specimen Psilophyton robustius. On the grounds that this had side branches which divided into three as well as dividing into two, in 1956 Hopping moved it to a new genus Trimerophyton.

== Phylogeny ==
At first most of the early polysporangiophytes (land plants other than liverworts, mosses and hornworts) were placed in a single class, Psilophyta, established in 1917 by Kidston and Lang. As additional fossils were discovered and described, it became apparent that the Psilophyta were not a homogeneous group of plants. In 1968, Banks proposed splitting it into three groups, one of which was the subdivision Trimerophytina, informally called the trimerophytes. Psilophyton was a prominent member of this group. The distinction between main stems and strongly branched lateral stems evident in species such as P. forbesii has been considered to be one of the key steps towards the evolution of the leaves of euphyllophytes (modern members of which are the ferns and seed plants), based on the theory that such leaves evolved through 'webbing' of flattened lateral branching systems.

In 2004, Crane et al. published a simplified cladogram for the polysporangiophytes, based on a number of figures in Kenrick and Crane (1997). Part of their cladogram is reproduced below (with some branches collapsed into 'basal groups' to reduce the size of the diagram). It shows two of the better-known species of Psilophyton as early-diverging members of the euphyllophytes.

- euphyllophytes
  - † Eophyllophyton
  - - † basal groups (Psilophyton crenulatum, Ps. dawsonii)
    - - moniliforms (ferns; extant and extinct members)
      - - † basal groups (Pertica, Tetraxylopteris)
        - spermatophytes (seed plants; extant and extinct members)
