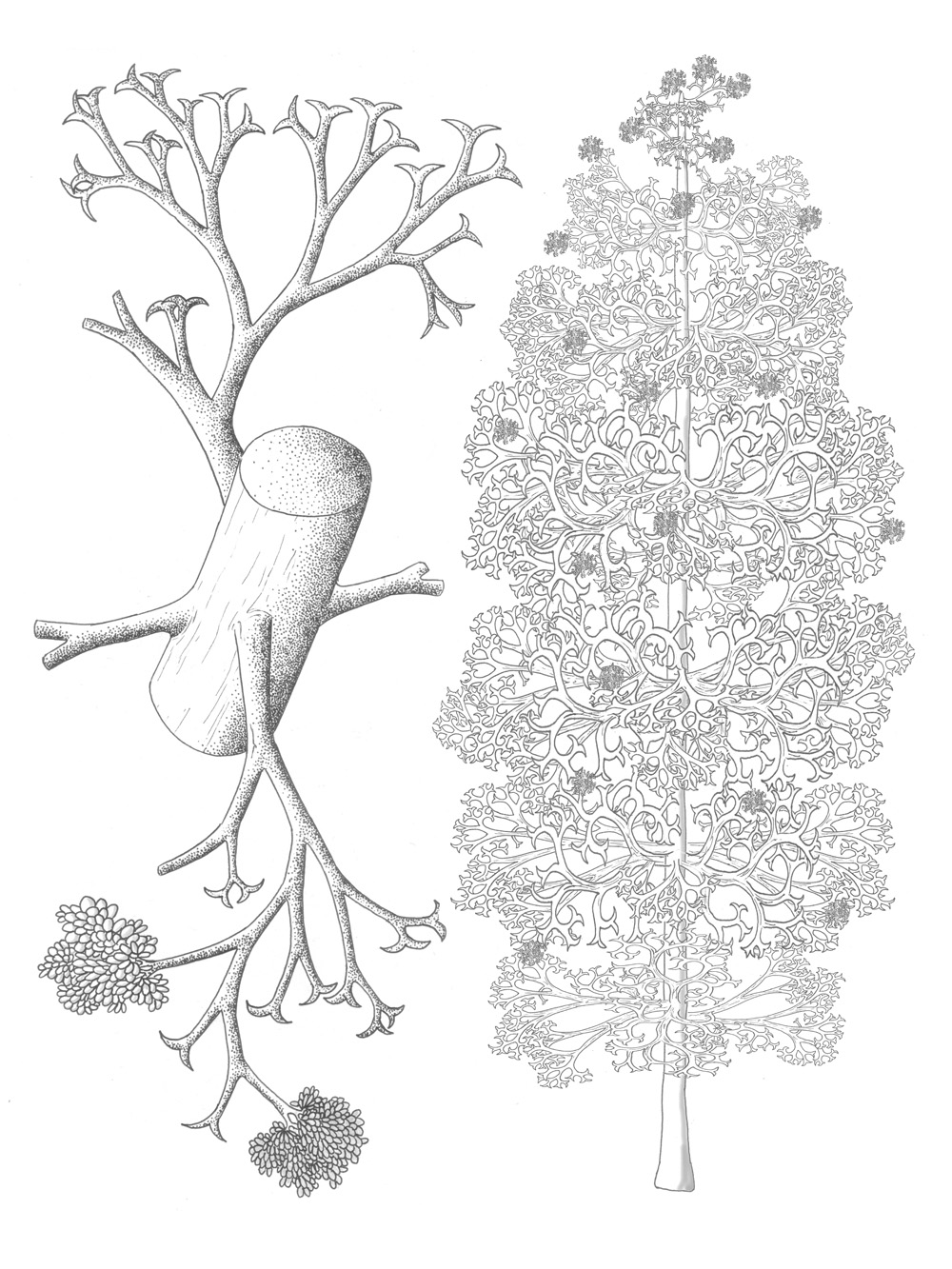

Scientific classification
- Kingdom: Plantae
- Clade: Embryophytes
- Clade: Polysporangiophytes
- Clade: Tracheophytes
- Clade: Euphyllophytes
- Genus: †Pertica; Kasper & H.N.Andrews (1972)

Species
- P. dalhousii Doran et al. (1978); P. quadrifaria Kasper & H.N.Andrews (1972); P. varia Granoff et al. (1976)

= Pertica =

Pertica Temporal range: Early Devonian–Middle Devonian

Extinct genus of plants

Pertica is a genus of extinct vascular plants of the Early to Middle Devonian (around 420 to 380 million years ago). It has been placed in the "trimerophytes", a strongly paraphyletic group of early members of the lineage leading to modern ferns and seed plants.

== Description ==
Pertica quadrifaria (the type species of the genus) was described in 1972 from compression fossils found in the Trout Valley Formation of northern Maine, USA. It was an upright plant which grew to perhaps as much as a metre (3 ft) in height. It comprised a main, straight stem (axis) with side branches which developed dichotomously, branching many times at increasingly shorter intervals. Some of the terminal branchlets bore masses of erect paired, ellipsoidal sporangia in distinctive tight clusters. The branches were arranged in a spiral pattern, forming four vertical rows. The specific epithet quadrifaria refers to this growth habit.

Pertica varia was described in 1976 from the Devonian of Eastern Canada. It was considerably taller than P. quadrifaria, reaching a height of nearly 3 m. The sporangia were similar to those of P. quadrifaria, although there were fewer in each cluster.

Pertica dalhousii was described in 1978 from fossils of Early or Middle Devonian age found in New Brunswick, Canada. The plant appears to have been similar to P. quadrifaria (only part is known), comprising a central stem (axis) with spirally arranged dichotomous side branches, some of which terminated in erect clusters of between 32 and 128 sporangia. Further specimens from the same rocks possibly belonged to another species of Pertica, but were not sufficiently well preserved to be named.

== Phylogeny ==
The clear differentiation between a main stem (axis) and lateral branches in Pertica, as in other "trimerophytes", has been considered to represent an early stage in the development of a growth pattern that later led to the evolution of megaphylls (large true leaves). Consistent with this, a cladogram published in 2004 by Crane et al. places Pertica in a paraphyletic stem group basal to the seed plants (spermatophytes) which have such leaves.

- euphyllophytes
  - † Eophyllophyton
  - - † basal groups (Psilophyton crenulatum, Ps. dawsonii)
    - - moniliforms (ferns; extant and extinct members)
      - - † basal groups (Pertica, Tetraxylopteris)
        - spermatophytes (seed plants; extant and extinct members)

Other researchers have produced rather different analyses. Rothwell's analysis separates "trimerophytes", like Pertica, from progymnosperms, like Tetraxylopteris, with only the latter being closely related to seed plants.
