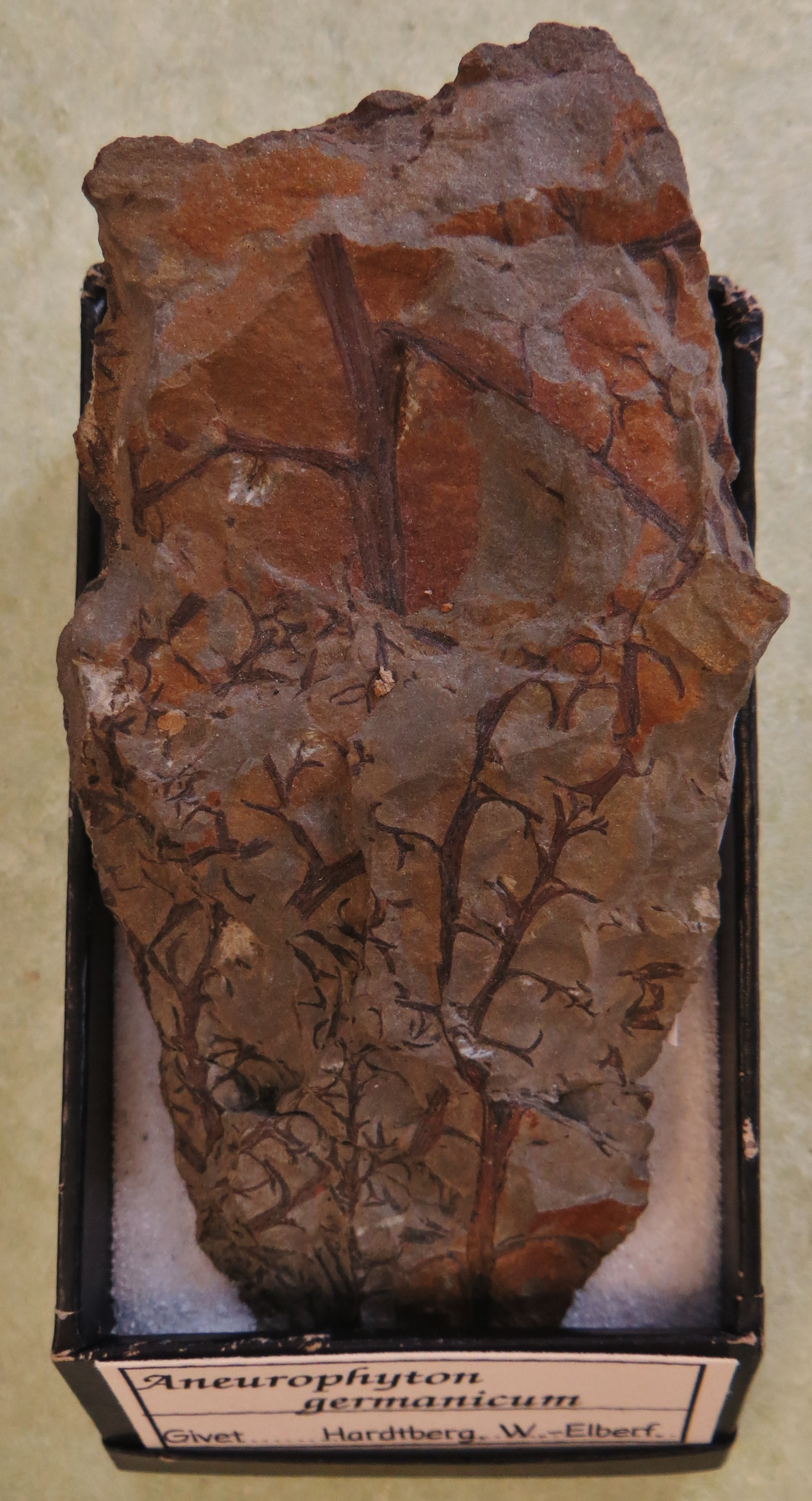

Scientific classification
- Kingdom: Plantae
- Clade: Tracheophytes
- Class: †Progymnospermopsida
- Order: †Aneurophytales
- Family: †Aneurophytaceae

Genera
- †Aneurophyton; †Proteokalon; †Protopteridium; †Sphenoxylon; †Tetraxylopteris; †Rellimia

= Aneurophytaceae =

Extinct family of plants

The Aneurophytaceae are an extinct family of Progymnosperms belonging to the Aneurophytales
