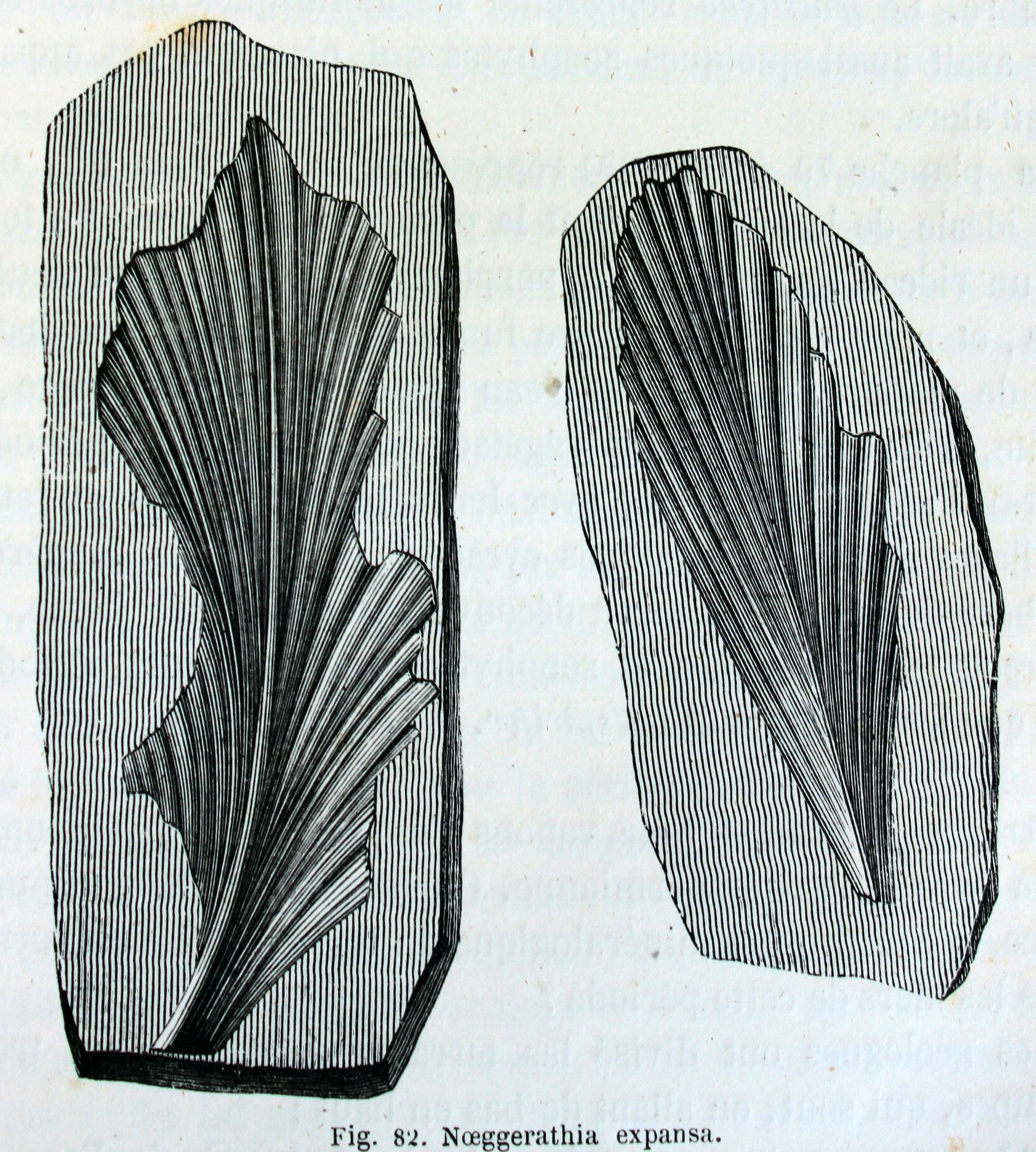
- Noeggerathia expansa

Scientific classification
- Kingdom: Plantae
- Clade: Tracheophytes
- Class: †Progymnospermopsida
- Order: †Noeggerathiales

Families
- Noeggerathiaceae; Tingyostachyaceae

= Noeggerathiales =

Noeggerathiales Temporal range: Upper Carboniferous–Late Permian

Extinct order of plants

External image
- Life restoration of Paratingia wuhaia Art by Yugao Ren and Sijia Tang

Noeggerathiales is a now-extinct order of vascular plants. The fossil range of the order extends from the Upper Carboniferous to the upper Permian (Lopingian). Noeggerathiales have been previously linked to horsetails and ferns, but are currently believed to be progymnosperms, being woody like seed plants, but still producing spores rather than seeds. Noeggerathiales are thought to have grown as cycad-like plants with relatively thick unbranched, vertical stems, that were leafless except for a crown at the top of the stem, composed of pinnate (fern-like) leaves. They were primarily confined to the wet tropical regions where there was no frost. Noeggerathiales are rare in European and North American floras, but are common components of Cathaysian Chinese floras.
