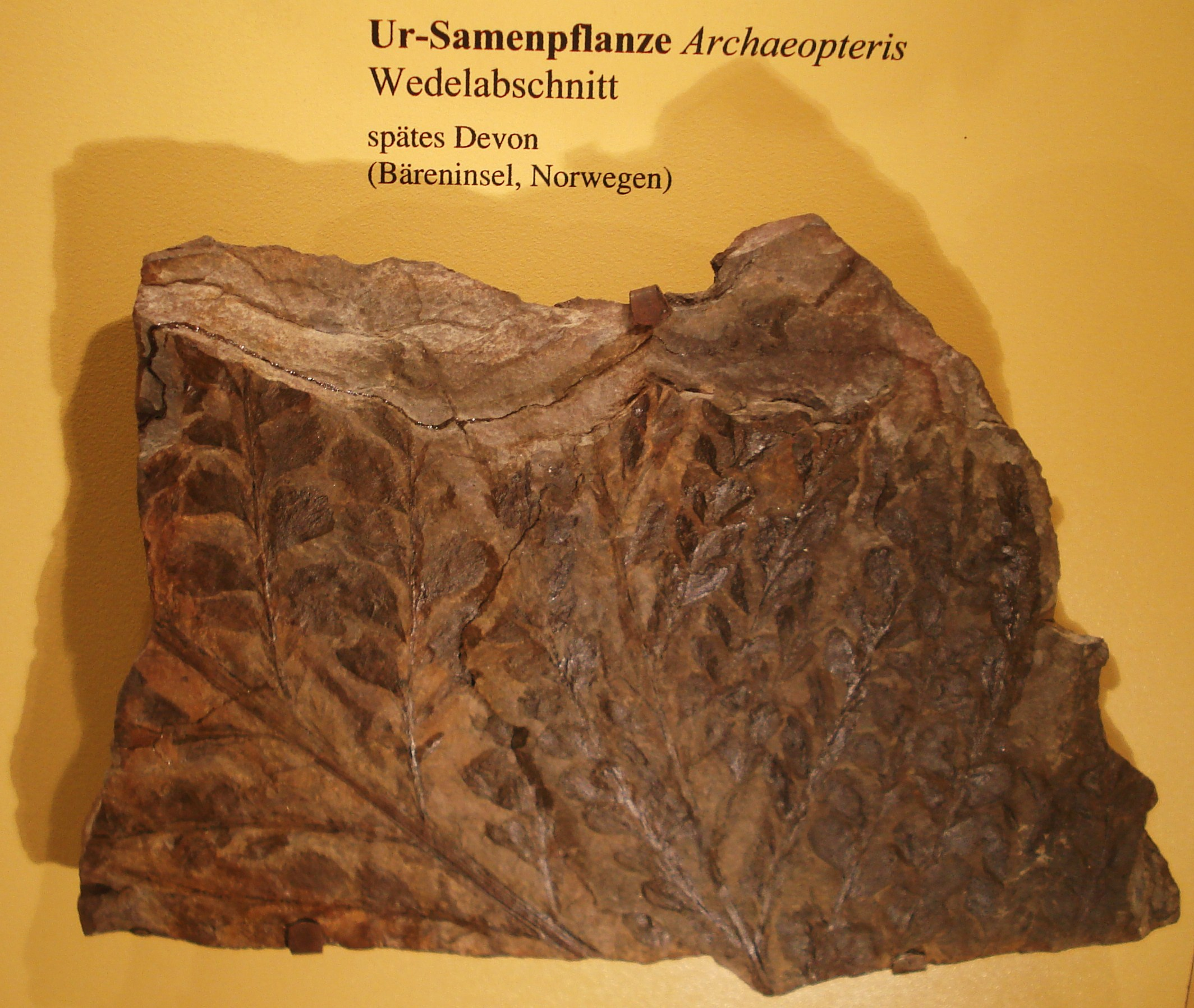
- Archaeopteris fossil leaves

Scientific classification
- Kingdom: Plantae
- Clade: Tracheophytes
- Class: †Progymnospermopsida

Orders
- †Aneurophytales; †Archaeopteridales; †Noeggerathiales; †Protopityales

= Progymnosperm =

Progymnosperm Temporal range: Middle Devonian–Lopingian

Extinct class of vascular plants

The progymnosperms are an extinct group of woody, spore-bearing plants that is presumed to have evolved from the trimerophytes, and eventually gave rise to the spermatophytes, ancestral to both gymnosperms and angiosperms (flowering plants). They have been treated formally at the rank of division Progymnospermophyta or class Progymnospermopsida (as opposite). The stratigraphically oldest known examples belong to the Middle Devonian order the Aneurophytales, with forms such as Protopteridium, in which the vegetative organs consisted of relatively loose clusters of axes. Tetraxylopteris is another example of a genus lacking leaves. In more advanced aneurophytaleans such as Aneurophyton these vegetative organs started to look rather more like fronds, and eventually during Late Devonian times the aneurophytaleans are presumed to have given rise to the pteridosperm order, the Lyginopteridales. In Late Devonian times, another group of progymnosperms gave rise to the first really large trees known as Archaeopteris. The latest surviving group of progymnosperms is the Noeggerathiales, which persisted until the end of the Permian.

Other characteristics:

- Vascular cambium with unlimited growth potential is present as well as xylem and phloem.
- Ancestors of the earliest seed plants as well as the first true trees.
- Strong monopodial growth is exhibited.
- Aneurophytales was homosporous, while the remaining groups were heterosporous.
- Pycnoxylic wood was found in both Archaeopteridales and Noeggerathiales.

== Phylogeny ==
Progymnosperms are a paraphyletic grade of plants.

- Tracheophyta
  - †Rhyniopsida
  - - Lycopodiophytina (Clubmosses, Spikemosses & Quillworts)
    - - †Eophyllophyton
      - - †Trimerophytopsida
        - - Moniliformopses
            Polypodiophytina (Ferns)
          - Radiatopses
            - †Pertica
            - Lignophytes
              - †Aneurophytopsida
              - Metalignophytes
                - - †Protopityales Nemejc 1963
                  - - †Archaeopteridales
                    - †Noeggerathiales Nemejc emend. J. Wang et al. 2021
                - Spermatophytina (Seed plants)
