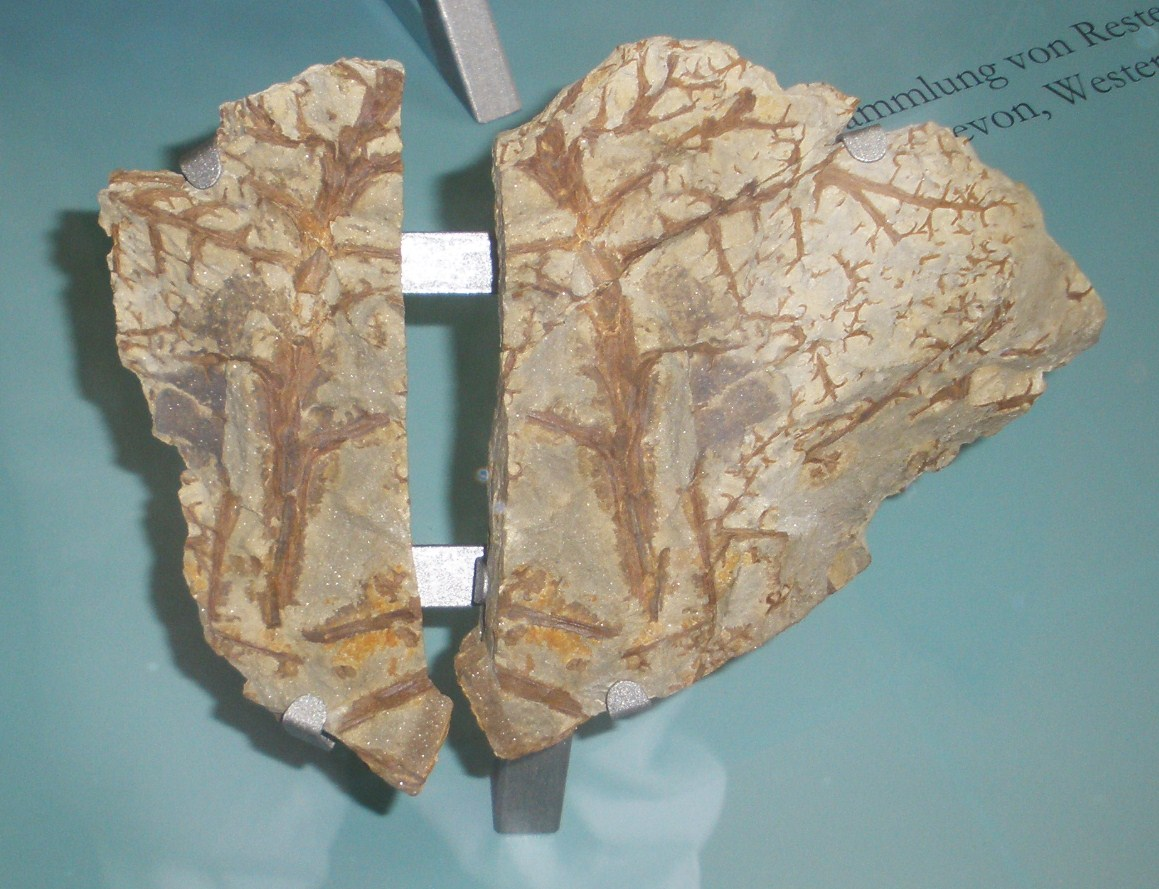
- A fossil specimen of Aneurophyton at the Museum of Natural History, Görlitz.

Scientific classification
- Kingdom: Plantae
- Clade: Tracheophytes
- Class: †Progymnospermopsida
- Order: †Aneurophytales
- Family: †Aneurophytaceae
- Genus: †Aneurophyton; Kraüsel, Weyland (1923)

Species
- Aneurophyton duoi; Aneurophyton germanicum; Aneurophyton olnense?

= Aneurophyton =

Genus of vascular plants

Aneurophyton is a genus of extinct vascular plants that belong to the Aneurophytales, a class of progymnosperms. The most well-known species within the genus are A. germanicum and A. doui, while a third probable species, A. olnense, has also been described. Aneurophyton is primarily known from multiple occurrence records of A. germanicum and A. doui which occur in Middle Devonian and Upper Devonian (late Eifelian to Famennian) outcrops in Belgium, China (in the western part of Dzungaria), Germany, and the United States (New York).

== Taxonomy and distribution ==
Some uncertain species within the genus are also recorded from Middle Devonian outcrops in Kazakhstan, Russia (Timan and Siberia), and Ukraine. While a number of species have been described in the paleobotanical literature, the genus may have only contained two species which have been well described, A. germanicum and A. doui. A third probably species, A. olnense, is also found in Fammenian outcrops in Belgium. If the ages of the Early Devonian (Emsian) records of A. germanicum reported from Siberia are confirmed, the Aneurophyton-producing fossils site in that region would constitute the oldest records of this genus.

== Evolution ==
The evolution of Aneurophyton is not well understood, as it is known only from a limited number of fossil occurrences. However, progymnosperms like Aneurophyton are thought to have played a key role in the transition from non-seed plants to true seed plants.

Given that the species A. germanicum and A. doui, and A. olnense, appear to have occurred around the same time, it is possible that the three species are sister taxa. The recovery of an A. germanicum fossil from the early Devonian of Siberia, however, may imply instead that speciation within this genus began with A. germanicum, or that the common ancestor of these species likely had traits more similar to A. germanicum than to the other middle Devonian species.

== See also ==
- Progymnosperm
