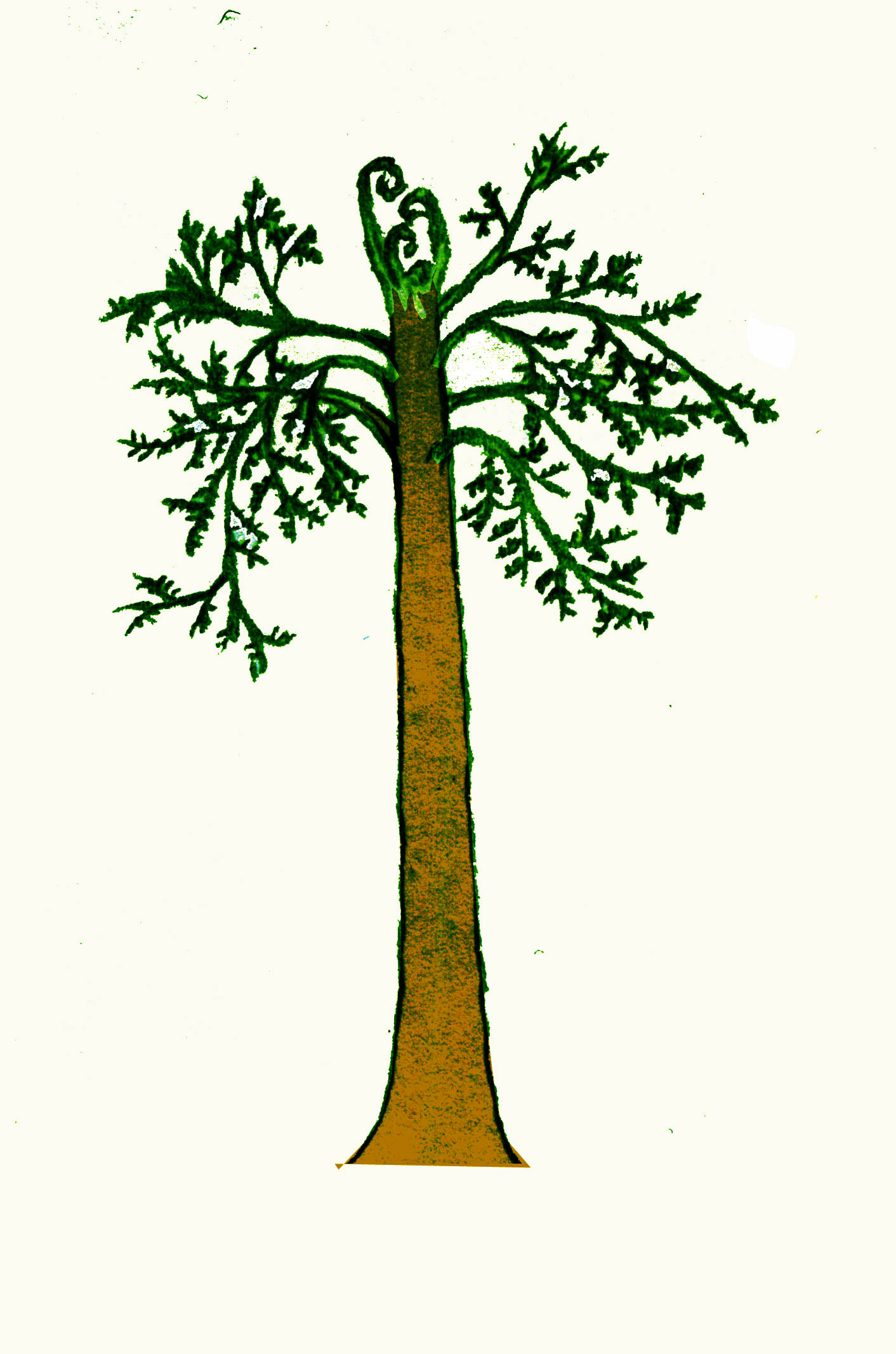
- Reconstruction of Aneurophyton germanicum

Scientific classification
- Kingdom: Plantae
- Clade: Tracheophytes
- Class: †Progymnospermopsida
- Order: †Aneurophytales; Beck (1976)

Families
- †Aneurophytaceae

= Aneurophytales =

Aneurophytales Temporal range: Emsian–Tournaisian

Extinct order of trees

The Aneurophytales are an extinct order of progymnosperms, considered among the earliest plants to produce true wood via a vascular cambium. They represent a crucial evolutionary link between simpler trimerophytes and more advanced seed plants.

== Description ==
These plants were spore-bearing, lacked true leaves, and used photosynthetic stems for energy production. They exhibited three-dimensional branching patterns and possessed a lobed or actinostelic stele with secondary xylem. Some species, like Aneurophyton, likely grew as shrubs or climbing vines, while others such as Tetraxylopteris may have had non-self-supporting aerial stems.
