= Celatheca =

Celatheca Temporal range: Early Devonian

Scientific classification
- Kingdom: Plantae
- Clade: Tracheophytes
- Stem group: †Rhyniophytes
- Form taxon: †Cooksonioidea
- Genus: †Celatheca; S.G.Hao & Gensel (1995)

Species
- C. beckii S.G.Hao & Gensel (1995)

Extinct genus of Devonian plants

Celatheca is a genus of extinct plants of the Early Devonian (Pragian, around 410 million years ago). Fossils were first found in the Posongchong Formation of eastern Yunnan, China. The leafless stems (axes) divided dichotomously but unequally so that one branch formed more of a 'main' stem and the other a side branch system. Side branches which did not bear spore-forming organs or sporangia divided two or three times further, ending in tips which curled back on themselves. Side branches bearing sporangia ultimately divided to produce a group of four sporangia, each with an outer leaf-like bract which folded around the sporangium. Celatheca resembles the Australian fossil Yarravia.
