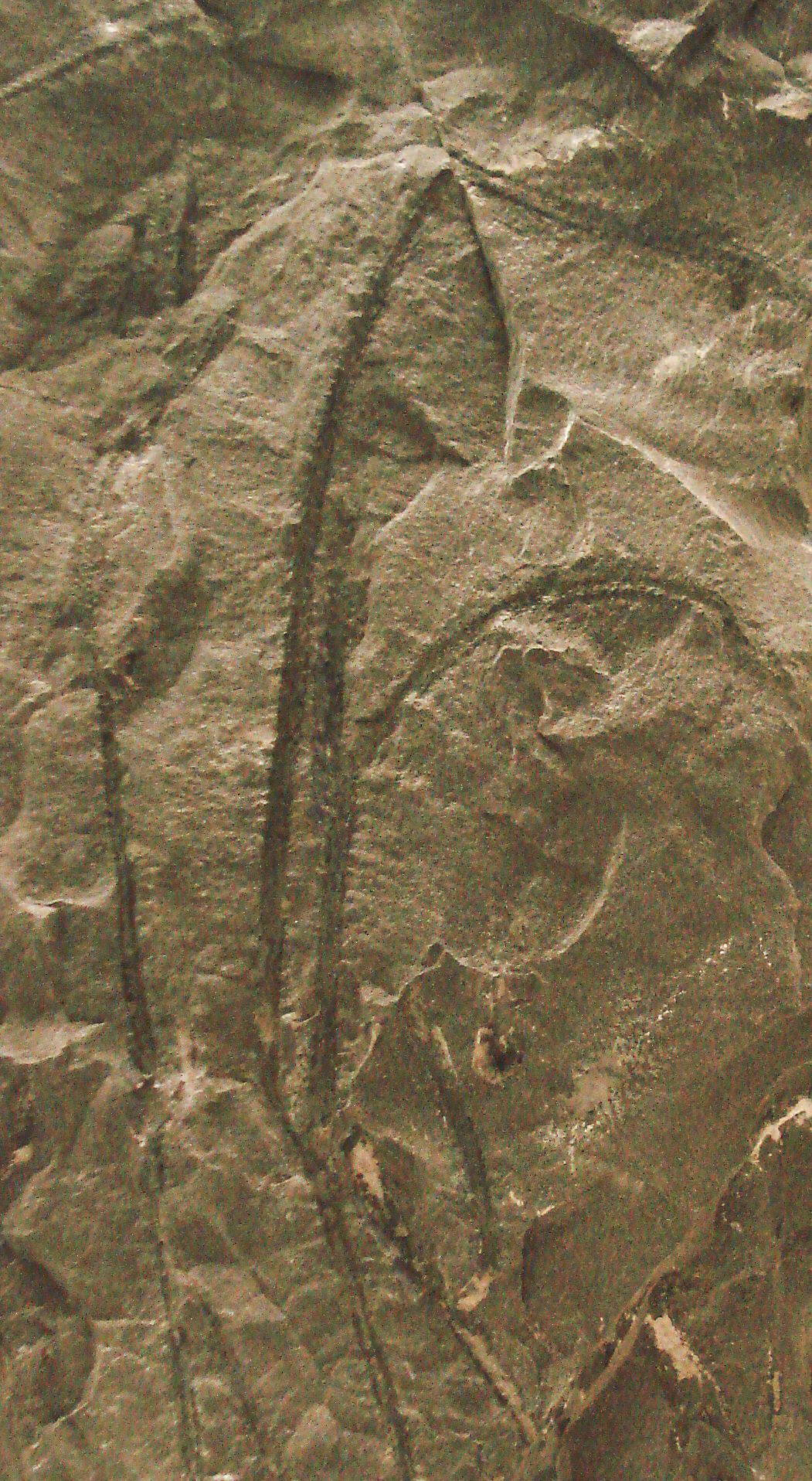
- Fossil of Psilophyton dawsonii, an early euphyllophyte

Scientific classification
- Kingdom: Plantae
- Clade: Embryophytes
- Clade: Polysporangiophytes
- Clade: Tracheophytes
- Clade: Euphyllophytes

Synonyms
- Euphyllophyta Kenrick & Crane 1997; Telomophyta

= Euphyllophyte =

Euphyllophyte Temporal range: Devonian–Present

Clade of vascular plants

The euphyllophytes are a clade of plants within the tracheophytes (the vascular plants). The group may be treated as an unranked clade, a division under the name Euphyllophyta or a subdivision under the name Euphyllophytina. The euphyllophytes are characterized by the possession of true leaves ("megaphylls"), and comprise one of two major lineages of extant vascular plants. As shown in the cladogram below, the euphyllophytes have a sister relationship to the lycopodiophytes or lycopsids. Unlike the lycopodiophytes, which consist of relatively few presently living or extant taxa, the euphyllophytes comprise the vast majority of vascular plant lineages that have evolved since both groups shared a common ancestor more than 400 million years ago. The euphyllophytes consist of two lineages, the spermatophytes or seed plants such as flowering plants (angiosperms) and gymnosperms (conifers and related groups), and the Polypodiophytes or ferns, as well as a number of extinct fossil groups.

The division of the extant tracheophytes into three monophyletic lineages is supported in multiple molecular studies. Other researchers argue that phylogenies based solely on molecular data without the inclusion of carefully evaluated fossil data based on whole plant reconstructions, do not necessarily completely and accurately resolve the evolutionary history of groups like the euphyllophytes.

The following cladogram shows a 2004 view of the evolutionary relationships among the taxa described above.

- Tracheophytes
  - Lycopodiophytes
    - Clubmosses
    - - Quillworts
      - Spikemosses
  - Euphyllophytes
    - Spermatophytes
      - Angiosperms
      - - - Cycads
          - Ginkgo
        - - Conifers
          - Gnetophytes
    - Polypodiopsida
      - - Ophioglossoid ferns
        - Whisk ferns
      - - - Marattioid ferns
          - Horsetails
        - Leptosporangiate ferns

An updated phylogeny of both living and extinct Euphyllophytes with plant taxon authors from Anderson, Anderson & Cleal 2007.

- Tracheophyta
  - †Rhyniopsida
  - Eutracheophytes
    - Lycopodiophytina Tippo sensu Ruggiero et al. 2015 (Clubmosses, Spikemosses & Quillworts)
    - Euphyllophytes
      - †Eophyllophyton
      - - †Trimerophytopsida
        - Megaphylla
          - Moniliformopses
            Polypodiophytina Reveal 1966 sensu Ruggiero et al. 2015 (Ferns)
          - Radiatopses
            - †Pertica
            - Lignophytes
              - †Aneurophytopsida
              - Metalignophytes
                - †Archaeopteridopsida
                - - †Protopityales
                  - Spermatophytina sensu Ruggiero et al. 2015 (Seed plants)
