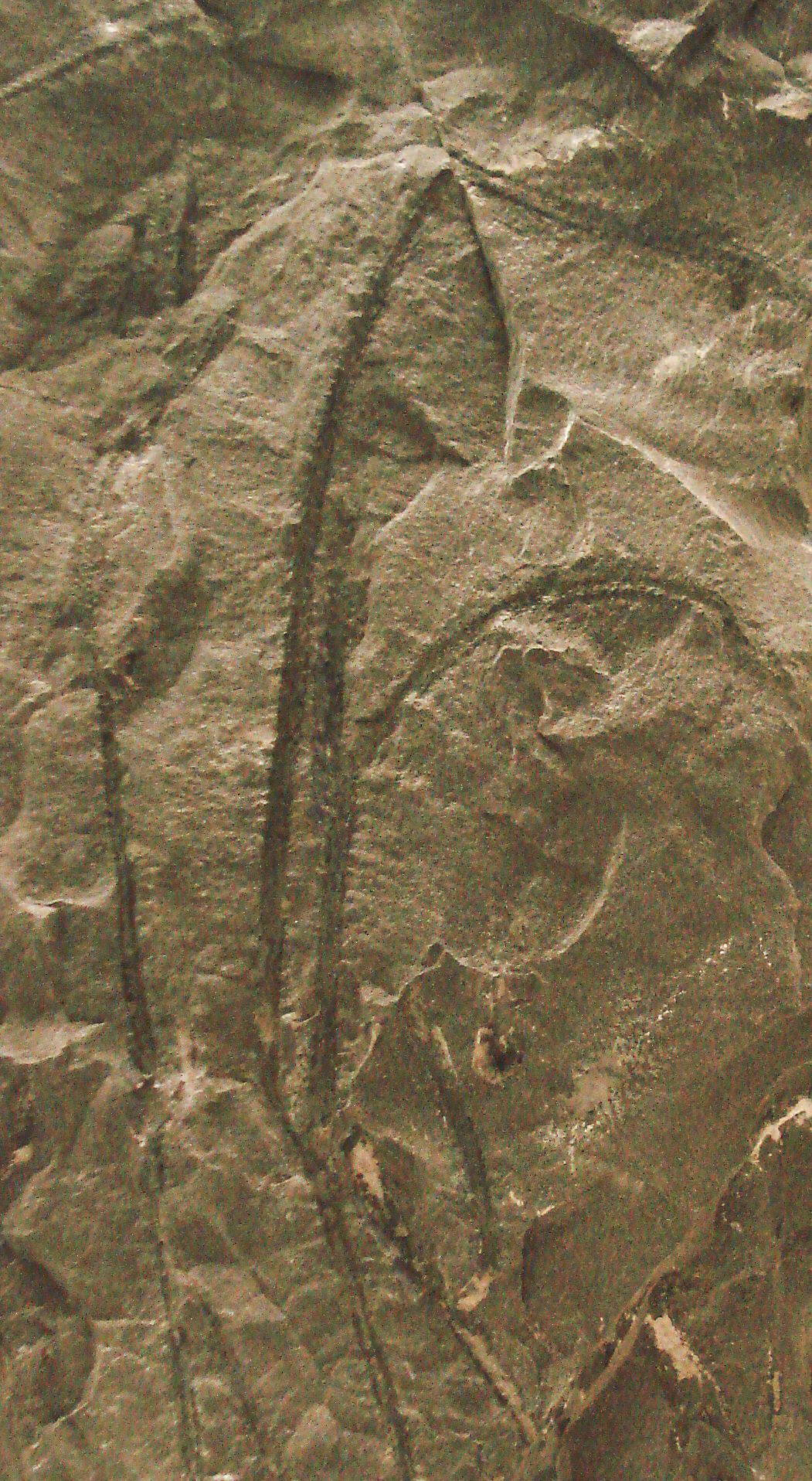
- Fossil of Psilophyton dawsonii

Scientific classification
- Kingdom: Plantae
- Clade: Tracheophytes
- Class: †Trimerophytopsida; A.S.Foster & E.M.Gifford 1974

Order
- †Trimerophytales

Synonyms
- Trimerophyta (orth. var.); Psilophyta (orth. var.); Trimerophytophyta Bold 1973; Trimerophytophytina Banks 1975; Psilophytophyta Zimmermann 1930; Psilophytophytina Kryshtofovich 1945

= Trimerophytopsida =

Trimerophytopsida Temporal range: Devonian

Extinct class of vascular plants

Trimerophytopsida (or Trimeropsida) is a class of early vascular plants from the Devonian, informally called trimerophytes. It contains genera such as Psilophyton. This group is probably paraphyletic, and is believed to be the ancestral group from which both the ferns and seed plants evolved. Different authors have treated the group at different taxonomic ranks using the names Trimerophyta, Trimerophytophyta, Trimerophytina, Trimerophytophytina and Trimerophytales.

== Taxonomy ==
At first most of the early land plants other than the bryophytes (i.e. the polysporangiophytes) were placed in a single class Psilophyta, established in 1917 by Kidston and Lang. As additional fossils were discovered and described, it became apparent that the Psilophyta were not a homogeneous group of plants. In 1968 Banks first proposed splitting this taxon into three groups, which he put at the rank of subdivision; he clarified his proposal in 1975. One of the three groups was the Trimerophytina. The subdivision is based on the type genus Trimerophyton, which might be expected to produce 'Trimerophytophytina' as the name of the subdivision, but the International Code of Nomenclature for algae, fungi, and plants allows the 'phyton' part of a genus name optionally to be omitted before '-ophyta', '-ophytina' and '-opsida'.

The group has also since been treated as a division under the name Trimerophyta or Trimerophytophyta, as a class under the name Trimeropsida or Trimerophytopsida (as here), and as an order under the name Trimerophytales.

- Subphylum †Trimerophytina Banks 1975
  - Class †Trimerophytopsida Foster & Gifford 1974 [Trimeropsida Banks 1975; Psilophytopsida Kidston & Lang 1917; Psilophytidae Nemejc 1963]
    - Order †Trimerophytales Banks ex Kasper et al. 1974 [Psilophytales Pia 1924]
      - Family †Trimerophytaceae Banks 1967 [Psilophytaceae Hirmer 1927; Hostinellaceae Pia 1924; Dawsonitaceae Nemejc 1963]
        - Genus †Dawsonites Nemejc 1963
        - Genus †Hostinella Barrande ex Stur 1882
        - Genus †Oocampsa Andrews, Gensel & Kasper 1975
        - Genus †Euphyllophyton Hao & Beck
        - Genus †Pauthecophyton Xue et al. 2012
        - Genus †Psilophyton Dawson 1859 emend. Hueber & Banks 1967
        - Genus †Trimerophyton Hopping 1956

== See also ==
- Euphyllophyta, containing seed plants and ferns

== Bibliography ==
- Gensel, P.G. & Edwards, D., eds. (2001), Plants invade the Land : Evolutionary & Environmental Perspectives, New York: Columbia University Press, ISBN 978-0-231-11161-4
