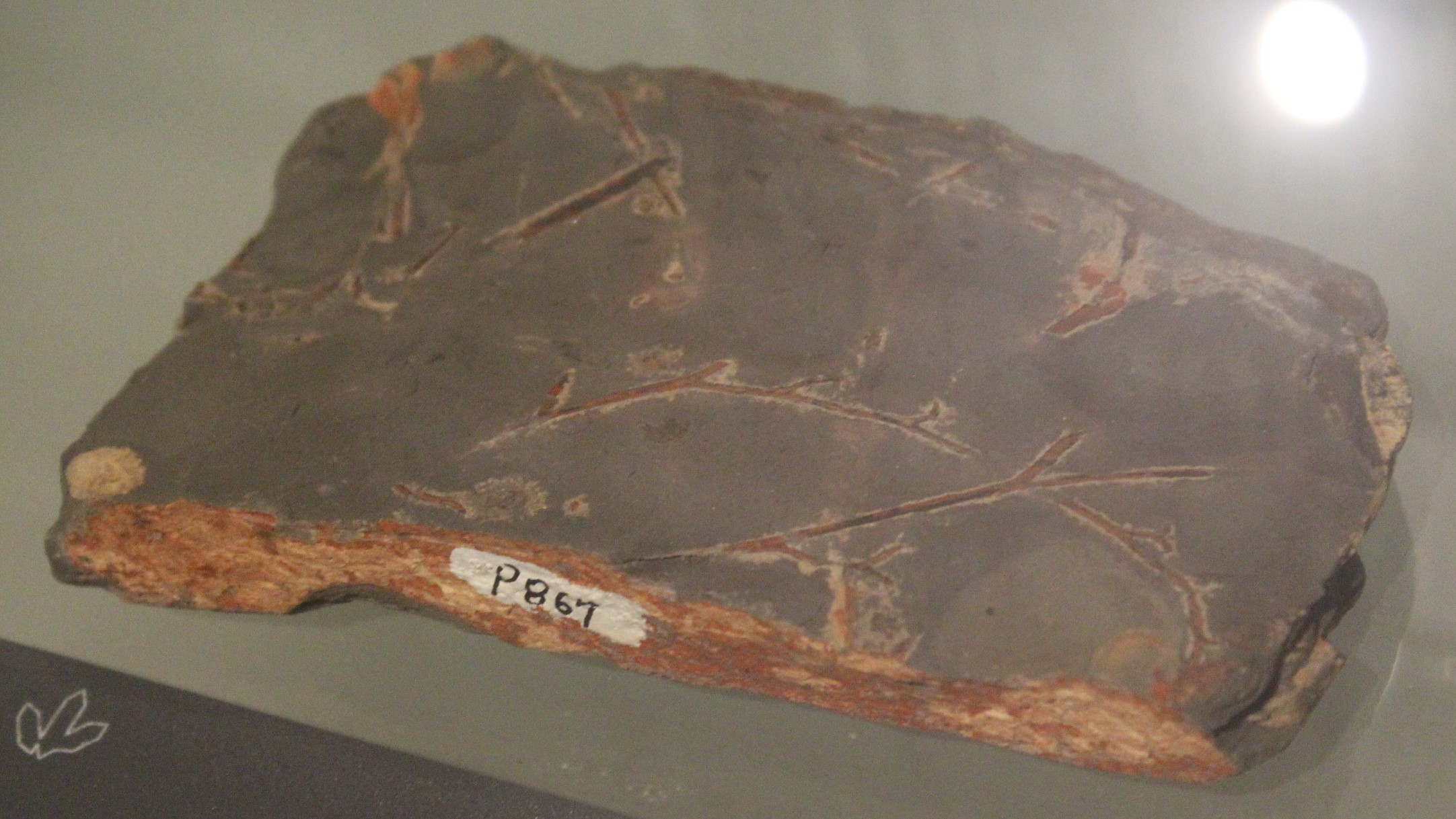
- Fossil specimen of E. bellum, Geological Museum of China

Scientific classification
- Kingdom: Plantae
- Clade: Embryophytes
- Clade: Tracheophytes
- Clade: Euphyllophytes
- Genus: †Eophyllophyton; Hao & Beck 1993
- Species: †E. bellum

Binomial name
- †Eophyllophyton bellum Hao & Beck 1993

= Eophyllophyton =

Eophyllophyton Temporal range: Early Devonian

Extinct genus of plants

Eophyllophyton bellum is the oldest known plant bearing megaphyllous leaves. In 2013, Hao (one of the original taxon authors) and Xue placed the genus in a new class Eophyllophytopsida, considered to be an isolated lineage in the euphyllophytes.
