= List of Early Devonian land plants =

The list of Early Devonian (419.2 ± 2.8 to 393.3 ± 2.5 million years ago) land plants includes currently known vascular and potentially vascular plants, along with some possibly non-vascular plants, that have been described from global Early Devonian fossil assemblages.

== List of land plants ==
Genus/Species
Aarabia brevicaulis Meyer-Berthaud and Gerrienne 2001
Aberlemnia caledonica (Edwards 1970) Gonez and Gerrienne 2010b
Adoketophyton parvulum Zhu, Xue, Hao and Wang 2011
Adoketophyton subverticillatum (Li and Cai 1977) Li and Edwards 1992
Aglaophyton major (Kidston and Lang 1917) D.S. Edwards 1986
Amplectosporangium jiangyouense Geng 1992a
Anisophyton gothani Remy, Schultka and Hass 1986
Anisophyton potoniei Remy, Hass and Schultka 1986
Aphyllopteris gracilis Stepanov
Aphyllopteris rudis Rad.
Aphyllopteris tenuis Petrosyan
Armoricaphyton chateaupannense Strullu-Derrien, Kenrick, Tafforeau, Cochard, Bonnemain, Hérissé, Lardeux and Bardel 2014
Asteroxylon mackiei Kidston and Lang 1920b
Balchaschella tenera Senkevitsch 1978
Baoyinia sichuanensis Edwards and Li 2018
Baragwanathia abitibiensis Hueber 1983
Baragwanathia longifolia Lang and Cookson 1935
Barinophyton (Pectinophyton) norvegicum (Hoeg 1935) Schweitzer and Geisen 2008
Barinophyton (Pectinophyton) robustius Ananiev 1955
Barrandeinopsis beliakovii Kryshtofovich 1955
Barsassia ornata Zalessky 1933
Bathurstia denticulata Hueber 1972a
Bitelaria dubjanski (Istchenko and Istchenko 1979) Johnson and Gensel 1992
Blasaria minor Petrosyan 1967
Blasaria sibirica (Kryshtofovich 1927) Zalessky 1934
Bowerophylloides mendozaensis Edwards, Morel, Poiré and Cingolani 2001
Bracteophyton variatum Wang and Hao 2004
Brasilophyton gracile Mussa, Borgui, Bergamaschi, Schubert, Pereria and Rodrigues 2002
Caia sp. Fanning, Edwards and Richardson 1990
Calyculiphyton blanai Remy, Schultka and Hass 1991
Catenalis digitata Hao and Beck 1991a
Caudophyton aquatilis Stepanov 1967
Celatheca beckii Hao and Gensel 1995
Cervicornus wenshanensis Li and Hueber 2000
Chakassiophyton krasnovii Ananiev and Krasnov 1962
Chaleuria cirrosa Andrews, Gensel and Forbes 1974
Changwuia schweitzeri Hilton and Li 2000
Concavatheca (Cooksonia) banksii (Habgood, Edwards and Axe 2002) Morris, Edwards, Richardson, Axe, and Davies 2012b
Conchulophyton quadrosii Mussa, Borgui, Bergamaschi, Schubert, Pereria and Rodrigues 2002
Cooksonia acuminata Mussa, Borgui, Bergamaschi, Schubert, Pereria and Rodrigues 2002
Cooksonia cambrensis Edwards 1979
Cooksonia crassiparietilis Yurina 1964
Cooksonia hemisphaerica Lang 1937
Cooksonia paranensis Gerrienne, Bergamaschi, Pereira, Rodrigues and Steemans 2001
Cooksonia pertoni Lang 1937
Cooksonia pertoni Lang ssp. apiculispora Habgood, Edwards and Axe 2002
Cooksonia pertoni Lang ssp. pertoni Lang emend. Fanning et al. 1988
Cooksonia pertoni Lang ssp. reticulispora Habgood, Edwards and Axe 2002
Cooksonia rusanovii Ananiev 1960
Craswallia haegensis Morris and Edwards 2014
Crenaticaulis verruculosus Banks and Davis 1969
Culullitheca richardsonii Wellman, Edwards and Axe 1998
Danziella artesiana (Danzé-Corsin 1956) Edwards 2006
Dawsonites arcuatus Halle 1916
Dawsonites magnus Gerrienne 1992
Dawsonites subarcuatus Tims and Chambers 1984
Deheubarthia splendens Edwards, Kenrick and Carluccio 1989
Demersatheca contigua Li and Edwards 1996
Deuterophyton stockmansii Gerrienne 1998
Dibracophyton acrovatum Hao, Xue, Zhu and Wang 2012
Dichophyton latum Kovbasina and Petrosyan
Dichophyton typicus Petrosyan and Kovbasina 1962
Discalis longistipa Hao 1989a
Distichophytum mucronatum Mägdefrau 1938 (=Bucheria mucronata (Mägdefrau 1938) Høeg 1942)
Distichophytum ovatum (Dorf 1933 emend Hueber 1972) Schweitzer 1979
Drepanophycus chachlovii Ananiev 1966
Drepanophycus crepini Stockmans 1940
Drepanophycus devonicus (Weyland and Berendt 1968) Schweitzer and Giesen 1980
Drepanophycus gaspianus (Dawson) Kräusel and Weyland 1948
Drepanophycus qujingensis Li and Edwards 1995
Drepanophycus spinaeformis Göppert 1852 emend Li, Hueber, and Hotton 2000
Drepanophycus spinosus (Krejči 1880) Kräusel and Weyland
Eddiana gaspiana Pfeiler and Tomescu 2017
Edwardsnella campanulata Mussa, Borgui, Bergamaschi, Schubert, Pereria and Rodrigues 2002
Enigmophyton superbum Høeg 1942
Ensivalia deblondii Gerrienne 1996a
Eocooksonia sphaerica (Senkevitsch 1978) Doweld 2000 (=Cooksonella sphaerica Senkevitsch 1978)
Eogaspesiea gracilis Daber 1960
Eophyllophyton bellum Hao 1988
Equisetophyton praecox Schweitzer 1972
Estinnophyton gracile Fairon-Demaret 1978b
Estinnophyton wahnbachense (Kräusel and Weyland 1932) Fairon-Demaret 1979
Estinnophyton yunnanense Hao, Wang and Wang 2004
Faironella valentula Gerrienne 1996a
Ficoiditheca aenigma Morris, Edwards, Richardson, and Axe 2012a
Foozia minuta Gerrienne 1992
Forania plegiospinosa Gensel and Jensen 2013
Franhueberia gerriennei Hoffman and Tomescu 2013
Fusiformitheca fanningiae (Wellman, Edwards and Axe 1998) Xue and Wang 2011
Glyptophyton granulare Kryshtofovitch 1955
Gosferia curvata (Gerrienne 1991) Gerrienne 1999
Gosslingia americana Tanner 1982
Gosslingia breconensis Heard 1927
Gosslingia cordiformis Schweitzer 1979
Gothanophyton zimmermanni Remy and Hass 1986
Grassophyton akkaensis Antonova 2008
Grisellatheca salopensis Edwards, Wellman and Axe 1999
Guangnania cuneata Wang and Hao 2002
Guangnania minor Edwards, Geng and Li 2016
Gumuia zyzzata Hao 1989b
Halleophyton zichangense Li and Edwards 1997
Haplostigma irregularis (Schwarz) Seward 1932
Hedeia corymbosa Cookson 1935
Hedeia parvula Jurina 1969
Hedeia sinica Hao 1998
Hicklingia edwardii Kidston and Lang 1923
Hoegophyton sibiricum (Lepekhina) Radchenko
Horneophyton lignieri (Kidston and Lang 1920) Bargoorn and Darrah 1938
Hostinella hostimensis Stur 1882
Hostinella wahnbachensis Kräusel and Weyland 1935
Hostinella heardii Edwards 1980
Hostinella strictissima Høeg 1942
Hsüa deflexa Wang, Hao and Wang 2003
Hsüa robusta (Li and Cai 1978) Li 1982
Hueberia zhichangensis Yang, Li and Edwards 2009
Huia gracilis Wang and Hao 2001
Huia recurvata Geng 1985
Huvenia elongata Schultka 1991
Huvenia kleui Hass and Remy 1991
Isidrophyton iniguezii Edwards, Morel, Poiré and Cingolani 2001
Jaguariaivia melloii Mussa, Borgui, Bergamaschi, Schubert, Pereria and Rodrigues 2002
Jenisseiphyton lebedevii Ananiev 1954
Jenisseiphyton leclercqae Ananiev and Zakharova
Jenisseiphyton rudnevae (Peresvetov) Ananiev
Jiangyounia gengi Edwards and Li 2018
Jugumella burubaensis Senkevitsch
Jugumella jugata Senkevitsch
Juliphyton glazkini Stepanov 1975
Kaulangiophyton akantha Gensel, Kasper and Andrews 1969
Kidstonophyton discoides Remy and Hass 1991
Koeppenia eifeliensis Schweitzer 2000
Konioria andrychoviensis Zdebska 1982
Krithodeophyton croftii Edwards 1968
Langiophyton lignieri Remy and Hass 1991
Leclercqia andrewsii Gensel and Kasper 2005
Leclercqia complexa Banks, Bonamo and Grierson 1972 emend Bonamo, Banks and Grierson 1988
Lenticulatheca allenii Morris, Edwards, Richardson, Axe and Davies 2011
Lenticulatheca magna Morris, Edwards, Richardson, Axe and Davies 2011
Lenticulatheca mesodeca Morris, Edwards, Richardson, Axe and Davies 2011
Lenticulatheca variabilis Morris, Edwards, Richardson, Axe and Davies 2011
Lidasimophyton akkermensis Senkevitsch 1961
Loganophyton dawsoni Kräusel and Weyland 1961
Lyonophyton rhyniensis Remy and Remy 1980
Margophyton goldschmidtii (Halle) Zakharova 1981
Matharakia inopinata Tschirkova-Zalesskaja 1964
Maubasia notabilis Senkevitsch 1983
Minusia antiqua Tschirkova-Zalesskaja 1956
Mointina quadripartita Senkevitsch 1961
Monnowella bennettii Morris and Edwards 2014
Nothia aphylla Lyon 1964 ex Høeg 1967
Odonax borealis Gerrienne 1996b
Oocampsa catheta Andrews, Gensel and Kasper 1975
Oricilla bilinearis Gensel 1982b
Oricilla unilateralis Geng 1992b
Paracooksonia ambitispora Morris, Edwards, Richardson, Axe and Davies 2011
Paracooksonia apiculispora Morris, Edwards, Richardson, Axe and Davies 2011
Partitatheca cymosa Edwards, Richardson, Davies and Axe 2012
Partitatheca densa Edwards, Richardson, Davies and Axe 2012
Partitatheca horrida Edwards, Richardson, Davies and Axe 2012
Partitatheca splendida Edwards, Richardson, Davies and Axe 2012
Pauthecophyton gracile Xue, Hao, Zhu and Wang 2012
Pertica dalhousii Doran, Gensel and Andrews 1978
Pertica quadrifaria Kasper and Andrews 1972
Pertica varia Granoff, Gensel and Andrews 1976
Pertonella sp. Fanning, Edwards and Richardson 1991b
Planatophyton hujiersitense Gerrienne, Meyer-Berthaud, Yang, Steemans and Li 2014
Platyphyllum (=Flabellofolium) fissipartitum Steinmann and Elberskirch 1929?/Schweitzer 1987?
Polycladophyton gracilis Edwards and Li 2018
Polythecophyton demissum Hao, Gensel and Wang 2001
Protobarinophyton obrutschevii (Ananiev 1954) Ananiev 1955
Protocephalopteris praecox (Høeg) Ananiev 1960
Protohyenia janovii Ananiev 1957 (= Pseudosporochnous? (Bonamo and Banks 1966))
Protopteridium minutum Halle (1936) Koidzumi 1943
Protopteridium tschumischensis (Ananiev and Stepanov 1969) Stepanov 1973
Pseudosajania pimula Stepanov 1975
Psilodendrion sibiricum Lepekhina 1960
Psilophytites (Psilophyton) rectissimum Høeg 1945
Psilophytites gileppensis Gerrienne 1992a
Psilophyton arcuatum (Halle 1916) Schweitzer 1980
Psilophyton burnotense (Gilkinet 1875) Kräusel and Weyland 1948 (=Psilophyton goldschmidtii Halle 1916)
Psilophyton charientos Gensel 1979
Psilophyton coniculum Trant and Gensel 1985
Psilophyton crenulatum Doran 1980
Psilophyton dapsile Kasper, Andrews and Forbes 1974
Psilophyton dawsonii Banks, Leclercq and Hueber 1975
Psilophyton forbesii Andrews, Kasper and Mencher 1968
Psilophyton genseliae Gerrienne 1997b
Psilophyton microspinosum Kasper, Andrews and Forbes 1974
Psilophyton parvulum Gerrienne 1995
Psilophyton primitivum Hao and Gensel 1998
Psilophyton princeps Dawson 1859
Psilophyton salairicum Ananiev and Stepanov 1966
Psilophyton szaferi Zdebska 1986
Psilophyton wyomingense Dorf 1933
Ramoferis amalia Hao and Xue 2011
Rebskia musaeformis Schweitzer 2000
Remyophyton delicatum Kerp, Trewin and Hass 2004
Renalia graberti Schweitzer 1980
Renalia hueberi Gensel 1976
Renalia major Schweitzer 1980
Resilitheca salopensis Edwards, Fanning, Davies, Axe, and Richardson 1995
Rhabdophyton striatus Danzé-Corsin 1956
Rhynia gwynne-vaughanii Kidston and Lang 1917
Salopella allenii Edwards and Richardson 1974
Salopella australis Tims and Chambers 1984
Salopella caespitosa Tims and Chambers 1984
Salopella marcensis Fanning, Edwards and Richardson 1992
Sartilmania jabachensis (Kräusel and Weyland 1935) Fairon-Demaret 1986b
Sawdonia acanthotheca Gensel, Andrews and Forbes 1975
Sawdonia ornata (Dawson 1871) Hueber 1971
Sawdonia spinosissima Schweitzer 1982
Sawdonia wyomingense Dorf 1933
Saxonia kalugini Ananiev
Sciadophyton laxum (Dawson 1871) Steinmann 1928
Sciadophyton palustre Istchenko 1965
Sciadophyton steinmannii (Steinmann) Kräusel and Weyland 1930
Sengelia radicans Matsunaga and Tomescu 2017
Sennicaulis hippocrepiformis Edwards 1981
Serrulacaulis sp. (Hueber and Banks 1979) Xu, Berry and Wang 2011
Sichuania uskielloides Edwards and Li 2018
Sphaerullophyton originalis Mussa, Borgui, Bergamaschi, Schubert, Pereria and Rodrigues 2002
Sporathylacium salopense Edwards, Morel, Poiré and Cingolani 2001
Stachyophyton yunnanense Geng 1983
Stockmansella langii (Stockmans) Fairon-Demaret 1986a
Stolophyton acyclicus Stepanov 1975
Taeniocrada asiatica Petrosyan and Antonova 2008
Taeniocrada decheniana (Göppert) Kräusel and Weyland 1930
Taeniocrada dubia Kräusel and Weyland 1930
Taeniocrada latissima Senkevitsch 1978
Taeniocrada longisporangiata Schweitzer 1980b
Taeniocrada orientalis Radchenko 1962
Taeniocrada pilosa Senkevitsch 1978
Tarella trowenii Edwards and Kenrick 1986
Tarrantia salopensis Fanning, Edwards and Richardson 1992
Tastaephyton bulakus Senkevitsch 1959
Teruelia diezii Cascales-Miñana and Gerrienne 2017
Thrinkophyton formosum Kenrick and Edwards 1988b
Thursophyton sp. Nathorst 1915
Tirasophyton europaeum (Istchenko) Istchenko 1974
Tirassia incisa Istchenko 1968
Tomiphyton primaevum Zalessky 1937
Tortilicaulis offaeus Edwards, Fanning and Richardson 1994
Tortilicaulis transwalliensis Edwards 1979
Trichopherophyton teuchansii Lyon and Edwards 1991
Trimerophyton robustius (Dawson) Hopping 1956
Tursuidea paniculata Schweitzer 1987
Uksunaiphyton ananievi Stepanov 1975
Uralia camdjalensis Petrosyan 1960
Uralia minussinskiensis Petrosyan 1960
Urpicalis steemansii Gerrienne 1992b
Uskiella reticulata Fanning, Edwards and Richardson 1992
Uskiella spargens Shute and Edwards 1989
Ventarura lyonii Powell, Edwards and Trewin 2000
Wenshania zhichangensis Zhu and Kenrick 1999
Xitunia spinitheca Xue 2009
Yanmenia longa Edwards, Geng and Li 2016 (= Zosterophyllum longa Wang 2007)
Yarravia oblonga Lang and Cookson 1935
Yunia dichotoma Hao and Beck 1991b
Yunia guangnania Hao and Xue 2013
Zhenglia radiata Hao, Wang, Wang and Xue 2006
Zosterophyllum australianum Lang and Cookson 1930
Zosterophyllum bifurcatum Li and Cai 1977
Zosterophyllum deciduum Gerriene 1988
Zosterophyllum divaricatum Gensel 1982
Zosterophyllum dushanense Li and Cai 1977
Zosterophyllum fertile Leclercq 1942
Zosterophyllum llanoveranum Croft and Lang 1942
Zosterophyllum longhuashanense Li and Cai 1977
Zosterophyllum longum Høeg 1967
Zosterophyllum minifertilum Hao and Xue 2013
Zosterophyllum minor Ananiev 1960
Zosterophyllum minorstachyum Xue 2009
Zosterophyllum myretonianum Penhallow 1892
Zosterophyllum ramosum Hao and Wang 2000
Zosterophyllum rhenanum Kräusel and Weyland 1930
Zosterophyllum shengfengense Hao, Xue, Guo and Wang 2010
Zosterophyllum sichuanense Geng 1992
Zosterophyllum sinense Li and Cai 1977
Zosterophyllum spathulatum Li and Cai 1977
Zosterophyllum spectabile Schweitzer 1979
Zosterophyllum tenerum Hao and Xue 2013
Zosterophyllum xishanense Hao, Xue, Liu and Wang 2007
Zosterophyllum yunnanicum Hsü 1966

== See also ==
- Devonian
