= Malbaie =

Malbaie may refer to:

- La Malbaie, a town in Quebec, Canada
- Hautes-Gorges-de-la-Rivière-Malbaie National Park, Quebec, Canada
- Malbaie River, a tributary of the St. Lawrence River in Quebec, Canada
- Malbaie Lake (La Côte-de-Beaupré), a waterbody crossed by Malbaie River, in La Côte-de-Beaupré and Charlevoix Regional County Municipality, in Quebec, Canada
- Saint-Georges-de-Malbaie, Quebec, a community in Quebec, Canada
- HMCS La Malbaie, a 1942 Royal Canadian Navy revised Flower-class corvette, in Canada
- Malbaie Formation, a geologic formation in Quebec, Canada

== See also ==
- Malba (disambiguation)
