= Campbellton Formation =

Geologic formation in New Brunswick, Canada

- Stratigraphic range: Latest Pragian-Emsian 407.4 Ma
- Type: Geological formation
- Unit of: Gaspé Sandstones
- Overlies: Val d’Amour Formation
- Thickness: Nearly 1 kilometer

Location
- Region: New Brunswick
- Country: Canada

The Campbellton Formation is a geologic formation in New Brunswick. It preserves fossils dating back to the latest Pragian and Emsian of the Devonian period.

== Description ==
The Campbellton Formation is the southernmost representative of the Gaspé Sandstones group and can be divided into 6 facies associations (restricted lacustrine, marginal lacustrine, near-shore lacustrine, coastal-deltaic, sandy to gravelly alluvial plain, and gravelly proximal alluvial environments), and is nearly a kilometer thick. Lacustrine facies are prevalent in the lower parts of the eastern belt (representing a large open lake) while upper parts of the formation are dominated by alluvial facies (representing an eastward-flowing axial braided river system).

== Fossil content ==
=== Vertebrates ===
Acanthodians
Genus	Species	Presence	Material	Notes	Images
Ankylacanthus	A. incurvus	Atholville Beds.	Fin spines.	A possible gyracanthid, formerly known as Gyracanthus incurvus.	
Cheiracanthus?	C.? costellatus				
Mesacanthus	M. semistriatus				

Chondrichthyans
Genus	Species	Presence	Material	Notes	Images
Doliodus	D. latispinosus		Fin spines.	Also known from the York River and Battery Point formations.	
Protodus	P. jexi	"Atholville Beds, shoreline approximately 1.3 km W of the interprovincial bridgecrossing the Restigouche River, near Campbellton".	Isolated teeth.	A protodontid.	

Ostracoderms
Genus	Species	Presence	Material	Notes	Images
Yvonaspis	Y. campbelltonensis			A cephalaspid, formerly listed as a species of Cephalaspis.	
Yvonaspis	Y. jexi			A cephalaspid, formerly listed as a species of Cephalaspis.	
Yvonaspis	Y. westolli			A cephalaspid, formerly listed as a species of Cephalaspis.	

Placoderms
Genus	Species	Presence	Material	Notes	Images
Phlyctaenius	P. acadicus		Fragments of exoskeleton and dermal plates.	A phlyctaeniid.	
Phlyctaenius	P. atholi		Fragments of exoskeleton and dermal plates.	A phlyctaeniid.	
Phlyctaenius	P. stenosus		Fragments of exoskeleton and dermal plates.	A phlyctaeniid.	

=== Invertebrates ===
Arthropods
Genus	Species	Presence	Material	Notes	Images
Eoarthropleura		Near the Dalhousie Junction and Point la Nim areas.		An arthropleurid.	
Gaspestria	G. genselorum			A millipede.	
Millipede	Unnamed.		4 detailed impression fossils.		
cf. Parahughmilleria	cf. P. sp.	"Point La Nim (48°03.97’N; 66°24.78’W), west of Dalhousie, New Brunswick".	"Specimen NBMG 11012 consists of a part and counterpart of an articulated partial preabdomen of the opisthosoma".	A eurypterid.	
Primitia	P. mundula		Disarticulated valves.	An ostracod.	
Primitia	P. scaphoides		Disarticulated valves.	An ostracod.	
Pterygotus	P. anglicus	Atholville beds near the western end of the Campbellton Formation exposure.		A eurypterid.	
Pterygotus	P. sp.			A eurypterid.	
Scorpion	Unnamed	Near the Dalhousie Junction and Point la Nim areas.		A scorpion with book lungs preserved.	

Molluscs
Genus	Species	Presence	Material	Notes	Images
Cyclora	C. valvatiformis			A gastropod.	
Cyclora	C. imbricata			A gastropod.	

=== Plants ===
Plants
Genus	Species	Presence	Material	Notes	Images
Bitelaria	B. dubjanskii	Facies 1.		A tracheophyte.	
Chaleuria	C. cirrosa	Facies 5.		A tracheophyte.	
Drepanophycus	D. gaspianus	Facies 1, 2, 3 and 5.		A drepanophycale.	
Drepanophycus	D. spinaeformis	Facies 1, 2, 3, 5 and 6.		A drepanophycale.	
Drepanophycus	D. sp.	Facies 1 and 5.		A drepanophycale.	
Kaulangiophyton		Facies 1.		A tracheophyte.	
Leclercqia	L. complexa	Facies 1 and 4.		A protolepidodendrale.	
Leclercqia	L. andrewsii	Facies 1.		A protolepidodendrale.	
Loganophyton	L. dawsoni	Facies 1, 4 and 5.		A tracheophyte.	
Omniastrobus	O. dawsonii		"Impressions of strobili with numerous carbonized spore masses".		
Oocampsa	O. catheta	"About ½ mi west of Dalhousie Junction."		A tracheophyte.	
Oricilla	O. bilinearis	Facies 1 and 5.		A zosterophyll.	
Pachytheca		Facies 2.			
Pertica	P. dalhousii	Facies 5.		A tracheophyte.	
Psilophyton	P. coniculum	Facies 6.		A trimerophytopsid.	
Psilophyton	P. charientos	Facies 1.		A trimerophytopsid.	
Psilophyton	P. princeps	Facies 1, 3, 5 and 6.		A trimerophytopsid.	
Psilophyton	P. sp.	Facies 1 and 5.		A trimerophytopsid.	
Sawdonia	S. acanthotheca	Facies 1 and 2.		A zosterophyll.	
Sawdonia	S. ornata	Facies 1 and 5.		A zosterophyll.	
Spongiophyton	S. minutissimum	Facies 1, 2 and 6.			
Staphylophyton	S. semiglobosa	”Section 4”	26 incomplete axes	A zosterophyll.	
Taeniocrada	T. dubia	Facies 2 and 5.		A tracheophyte.	
Trimerophyton	T. robustius	Facies 4.		A trimerophytopsid.	
Zosterophyllum	Z. divaricatum	"South shore of the Restigouche River near Dalhousie, New Brunswick".		A zosterophyll.	

Fungi
Genus	Species	Presence	Material	Notes	Images
Prototaxites		Facies 2 and 6.			

== See also ==
- List of fossiliferous stratigraphic units in New Brunswick
