= Dianne Edwards =

Welsh palaeobotanist

Professor Dianne Edwards CBE, FRS, FRSE, FLS, FLSW (born 1942) is a palaeobotanist, who studies the colonisation of land by plants, and early land plant interactions.

== Early life ==
Edwards was born in Swansea, South Wales, and spent much of her time at her parents' bungalow on the Gower Peninsula.

== Career ==
Edwards' work has centred on early plant fossils, the majority of which have been retrieved from the UK. Her interest in early plants was initiated after she studied plant fossils preserved in three dimensions in the mineral pyrite (fools' gold).

Much of her later work has centred on the Rhynie chert and charcoalified fossils, large and microscopic, from the Welsh borderlands and South Wales.

Edwards is a Distinguished Research Professor, and former Head of School within the School of Earth and Ocean Sciences, at Cardiff University.

She is also a Fellow of the Royal Society, Fellow of the Royal Society of Edinburgh, an honorary Fellow at the University of Wales, Swansea, a Corresponding Member of the Botanical Society of America, and has links with China, consulting for the Beijing Museum of Natural History, and working on fossils from that country.

== Discoveries ==
Among Edwards's most notable works, are the discovery of vascular tissue in Cooksonia, the description and analysis of stomata in early land plants, and very early liverwort-like plants. The charcoalified nature of many of her fossils have enabled her to prove that wildfires took place in the Siluruan period. She has also worked on several enigmatic fossils such as Nematothallus, Tortilicaulis and Prototaxites.

She is the author or co-author of a considerable number of botanical names of fossil plants, such as Danziella D.Edwards (2006) and Demersatheca C.-S. Li & D.Edwards (1996).

== Distinctions ==
- Elected a Fellow of the Royal Society in 1996.
- President of the Palaeontological Association, 1996-1998.
- Awarded the CBE for Services to Botany in 1999.
- Trustee of the Natural History Museum, London.
- 2004 winner of the Lyell Medal.
- Founding Fellow of the Learned Society of Wales and in July 2010 was appointed as its inaugural Vice-President for Science, Technology and Medicine.
- President of the Linnean Society of London, 2012–2015.
- PhD honoris causa at the Faculty of Science and Technology at Uppsala University, Sweden, since 2014.
