= Battery Point Formation =

Geologic formation in Canada

- Stratigraphic range: Early Emsian-Early Eifelian
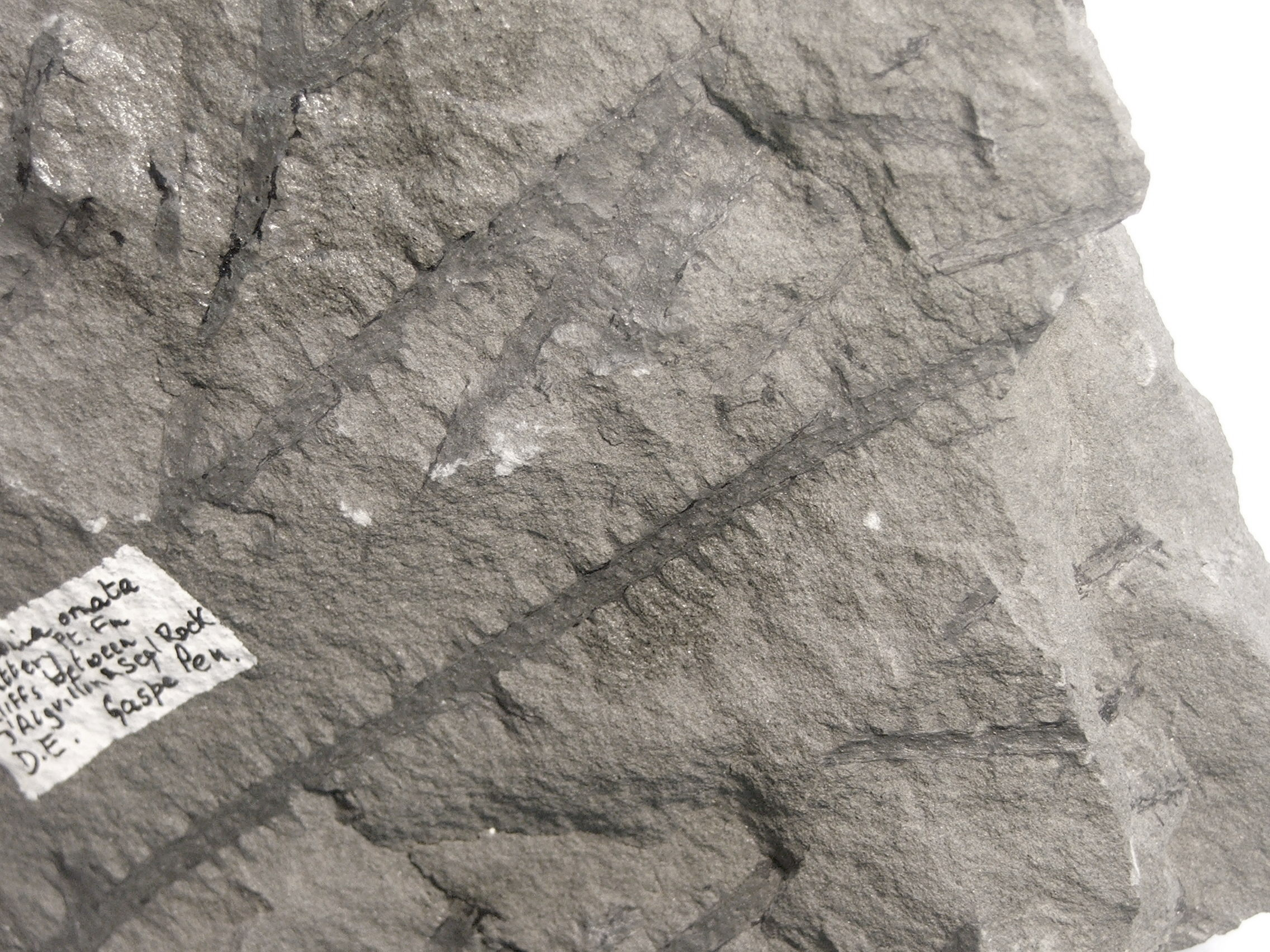
- Sawdonia ornata fossil from the Battery Point Formation
- Type: Geological formation
- Unit of: Gaspé Sandstones
- Underlies: Malbaie Formation
- Overlies: York River Formation
- Thickness: 2,300 m (7,550) ft

Location
- Region: Quebec
- Country: Canada

The Battery Point Formation is a geologic formation in Quebec. It preserves fossils dating back to the early Emsian to early Eifelian the lower Devonian period.

== Description ==
A part of the Gaspé Sandstones, the Battery Point Formation is believed to have been deposited in a fluvial environment based on the presence of rootlets as well as the abundance of trough and planar-tabular cross bedding, and the lower part resembles modern braided systems more than meandering systems. It rests unconformably on the shallow marine sandstones of the York River Formation (the basal unit of the Gaspé Sandstones and making the Battery Point Formation the first continental unit of the sequence), transitioning upwards into the Malbaie Formation, and is 2,300 meters (7,550 feet) thick.

== Fossil content ==
Limited intervals in the lower part of the formation contain remains of a few brachiopods and bivalves, though marine fauna is not known from other parts of the formation. Plant and freshwater fish fossils are also known, with a large diversity of primitive vascular plants found within the formation.

Animals
Genus	Species	Presence	Material	Notes	Images
Ankylacanthus	A. incurvus	Cap-aux-Os locality, Gaspé Peninsula.	Fin spines.	A possible gyracanthid, formerly known as Gyracanthus incurvus.	
Doliodus	D. latispinosus	Cap-aux-Os Member, north side of Gaspé Bay.	Fin spines.	Also known from the Campbellton and York River formations.	
Forillonaspis	F. lehmani	Cap-aux-Os locality		An arthrodire placoderm	
Gaspestria	G. genselorum	Locality W, Cap-aux-Os member	Four partial specimens	Recorded earlier as an undescribed juliform millipede.	

Plants
Genus	Species	Presence	Material	Notes	Images
Adelocladoxis	A. praecox			A cladoxylopsid	
Drepanophycus	D. spinaeformis	North shore of Gaspé Bay		A basal lycopod	
Eddianna	E. gaspiana	In the vicinity of Douglastown.		A rhyniopsid	
Franhueberia	F. gerriennei	South shore of Gaspé Bay, in the vicinity of Douglastown, Quebec.	A fossil preserved anatomically by cellular permineralization.	A euphyllophyte.	
Gmujij	G. tetraxylopteroides	South shore of Gaspé Bay, near Douglastown, Québec	Two axis fragments	A euphyllophyte	
Jowingeria	J. triloba	South shore of Gaspé Bay, near Douglastown	An axis fragment	A euphyllophyte	
Kenrickia	K. bivena	South shore of Gaspé Bay, near Douglastown	Ten separate axes and branches	One of the basalmost radiatopsids	
Leptocentroxyla	L. tetrarcha	South shore of Gaspé Bay, near Douglastown	One axis fragment	A euphyllophyte	
Nebuloxyla	N. mikmaqiana	South shore of Gaspé Bay, near Douglastown	One axis	A euphyllophyte	
Paracladoxylon	P. kespekianum	South shore of Gaspé Bay, east of Douglastown	Nine axis fragments	A cladoxylopsid	
Perplexa	P. praestigians	South shore of Gaspé Bay, in the vicinity of Douglastown	One axis fragment	A euphyllophyte	
Psilophyton	P. diakanthon, P. princeps	South shore of Gaspé Bay, in the vicinity of Douglastown		A trimerophyte	
Renalia	R. hueberi			A vascular plant.	
Sawdonia	S. ornata	North shore of Gaspé Bay, which is part of the Cap-aux-Os Member.		A zosterophyll.	
Stenoloboxyla	S. ambigua	South shore of Gaspé Bay, near Douglastown	Two axis fragments	A euphyllophyte	
Tainioxyla	T. quebecana	South shore of Gaspé Bay, near Douglastown	Two axis fragments	A euphyllophyte	
Wilhowia	W. phocarum	North Shore of Gaspé Bay, Quebec, Canada.	Partially permineralized adpressions of remains.	A basal euphyllophyte.	

Fungi
Genus	Species	Presence	Material	Notes	Images
Glomites	G. oqoti	In the vicinity of Douglastown, south shore of Gaspé Bay (Quebec, Canada).	Glomoid spores in trimerophyte axes.		

== See also ==
- List of fossiliferous stratigraphic units in Quebec
