= Gosslingiales =

Scientific classification
- Kingdom: Plantae
- Clade: Tracheophytes
- Clade: Lycophytes
- Plesion: †Zosterophylls
- Order: †Gosslingiales

Genera
- See text.

Extinct order of spore-bearing plants

Gosslingiales is an order of extinct zosterophylls. The zosterophylls were among the first vascular plants in the fossil record, and share an ancestor with the living lycophytes. The group has been divided up in various ways. Hao and Xue in 2013 used the presence or absence of terminal sporangia as a major dividing feature. The order Zosterophyllales was used for species with terminal as well as lateral sporangia, which were considered to have determinate growth, with their sporangia generally being arranged in spikes. The paraphyletic order Gosslingiales was used for species without terminal sporangia (i.e. with only lateral sporangia), which were considered to have indeterminate growth, with fertile branches generally circinate (initially curled up). Species assignable to the Gosslingiales made up about 9% of all confirmed species in the Early Devonian flora.

== Taxonomy ==
=== Classification ===
Hao and Xue consider the order Gosslingiales to be one of the two major divisions of the zosterophylls (class Zosterophyllopsida). Other sources have used different divisions. Most of the genera placed in the Gosslingiales by Hao and Xue are placed in the Sawdoniales by Kenrick and Crane (1997). However, their Sawdoniales also includes taxa like the family Barinophytaceae that Hao and Xue place in a separate order Barinophytales, outside the zosterophylls, and the genus Hsua, which they regard as a possible rhyniopsid rather than a zosterophyll.

The classification of the zoterophylls is unsettled; Edwards and coauthors commented in 2015 that in the almost 50 years since 1966, "there has been an extraordinary proliferation of information on [...] new taxa, many of them endemics that reveal combinations of characters that defy conventional classification".

=== Phylogeny ===
The Gosslingiales are shown to be a paraphyletic group, basal to the Zosterophyllales, in one analysis by Hao and Xue:

- Zosterophyllopsida
  - - Gosslingia
    - Sawdonia
  - - Zosterophyllum llanoveranum
    - - Discalis
      - Zosterophyllales

The implication of the cladogram is that the Zosterophyllales – species with terminal sporangia – evolved from within the Gosslingiales. However, a study of zosterophyll diversity over time showed that the proportion of taxa with terminal sporangia declined in the Late Lochkovian when taxa without terminal sporangia evolved.

=== Genera ===
Genera included in the order are shown in the table below, with their family placement according to Hao and Xue, and the alternative classification of these genera by Kenrick and Crane (1997).

Genus	Family	Placement by Kenrick & Crane (1997)
†Crenaticaulis Banks & Davis	Gosslingiaceae	Sawdoniales: Sawdoniaceae
†Gosslingia Heard	Gosslingiaceae	Sawdoniales: Gosslingiaceae
†Oricilla Gensel	Gosslingiaceae	Sawdoniales: Gosslingiaceae
†Sawdonia Hueber	Gosslingiaceae	Sawdoniales: Sawdoniaceae
†Discalis Hao	Discaliaceae	outside Zosterophyllopsida
†Konioria Zdebska	incertae sedis	Sawdoniales: Sawdoniaceae

The order also includes Zosterophyllum llanoveranum, but not other species of Zosterophyllum, such as Zosterophyllum myretonianum.

A new genus, Ornicephalum, described in 2018, is of uncertain placement between the Zosterophyllales and the Gosslingiales.

== Bibliography ==
- Hao, Shougang & Xue, Jinzhuang (2013), The early Devonian Posongchong flora of Yunnan: a contribution to an understanding of the evolution and early diversification of vascular plants, Beijing: Science Press, ISBN 978-7-03-036616-0
- Kenrick, Paul & Crane, Peter R. (1997). The Origin and Early Diversification of Land Plants: A Cladistic Study. Washington, D.C.: Smithsonian Institution Press. ISBN 978-1-56098-730-7.
