= Franhueberia =

Franhueberia Temporal range: Early Devonian–Emsian

Scientific classification
- Kingdom: Plantae
- Clade: Tracheophytes
- Clade: Euphyllophytes
- Genus: †Franhueberia; L.A. Hoffm. & Tomescu
- Species: †F. gerriennei

Binomial name
- †Franhueberia gerriennei L.A. Hoffm. & Tomescu

Extinct genus of plants

Franhueberia is an extinct monospecific genus of vascular land plants described from Early Devonian (mid to late Emsian) outcrops of the Battery Point Formation along the south shore of Gaspé Bay, Quebec, Canada.

== Description ==
Franhueberia gerriennei is preserved as a cellular permineralization within a single cobble and consists of a small axis with a centrarch protostele. The secondary tissues of the vascular cambium contain extinct P-type cell walls. This type of cell wall consisted of scalariform bordered pits and multiaperturate pit membranes. The secondary vascular tissues in Franhueberia gerriennei represent one of the oldest examples of secondary growth. Wood or secondary xylem with P-type cell walls have also been observed in the slightly older (late Pragian-earliest Emsian) Armoricaphyton chateaupannense from western France and in an unnamed basal euphyllophyte from late Emsian outcrops of the Campbellton Formation in New Brunswick, Canada.

== Taxonomy ==
Franhueberia gerriennei was named by Hoffman and Tomescu in 2013. The genus is named for Francis Hueber, the paleobotanist who collected the specimens at Gaspé Bay, while the specific epithet was chosen in recognition of the numerous contributions to Early Devonian paleobotany by Philippe Gerrienne of the University of Liège, Belgium.

== Phylogeny ==
While the pattern of branching and fertile structures such as sporangia are unknown, Franhueberia is most similar anatomically to other basal euphyllophytes like Armoricaphyton chateaupannense and Psilophyton dawsonii. However, certain features of the primary and secondary vascular tissues such as the diameter of the primary xylem cylinder and ray anatomy sets Franhueberia apart from these other species. Given these and other differences combined with a current lack of a complete understanding of the whole plant, Franhueberia is currently classified as Euphyllophytina incertae sedis.

== See also ==
- Devonian
- List of Early Devonian land plants
- Polysporangiophytes
