= York River Formation =

Geologic formation in Quebec, Canada

- Stratigraphic range: Devonian
- Type: Geological formation
- Unit of: Gaspé Sandstones
- Underlies: Battery Point Formation

Location
- Region: Quebec
- Country: Canada

The York River Formation is a geologic formation in Quebec. It preserves fossils dating back to the Devonian period.

== Description ==
The basal unit of the Gaspé Sandstones, the York River Formation is wholly marine and the Battery Point Formation rests unconformably above it.

== Fossil content ==
=== Vertebrates ===
Acanthodians
Genus	Species	Presence	Material	Notes	Images
Ankylacanthus	A. incurvus	Anse-à-Brillant, Route 197.	Fin spines.	A possible gyracanthid, formerly known as Gyracanthus incurvus.	
Ankylacanthus	A. convexus	Mont Lyall and southwest of Mont Tuzo, Gaspé Peninsula.	Fin spines.	A possible gyracanthid, formerly known as Gyracanthus convexus.	

Chondrichthyans
Genus	Species	Presence	Material	Notes	Images
Doliodus	D. latispinosus	Upper part of the formation.	Fin spines.	Also known from the Campbellton and Battery Point formations.	

=== Invertebrates ===
Bivalves
Genus	Species	Presence	Material	Notes	Images
Montanaria	M. honquedoensis				

Cnidarians
Genus	Species	Presence	Material	Notes	Images
Procteria	P. (Pachyprocteria) vermifera	Upper part of the formation.		A tabulate coral.	

== See also ==
- List of fossiliferous stratigraphic units in Quebec
