= Armoricaphyton =

Scientific classification
- Kingdom: Plantae
- Clade: Tracheophytes
- Clade: Euphyllophytes
- Family: incertae sedis
- Genus: †Armoricaphyton

Extinct genus of vascular plants

Armoricaphyton is an extinct monospecific genus of vascular land plants described from Early Devonian (late Pragian-earliest Emsian) outcrops of the Chalonnes Formation in western France. The plant consists of small, leafless, longitudinally-ribbed axes that branch pseudomonopodially. Pairs of fusiform-shaped, twisted sporangia preserved as adpressions were found in association with the axes and may belong to this species. Permineralized specimens reveal the oldest documented wood or secondary xylem of any known fossil plant. The water-conducting tissues or tracheids consisted of extinct P-type cell walls. This type of cell wall consisted of scalariform bordered pits and perforated sheets that covered the openings (apertures) of the pits. A. chateaupannense is anatomically similar in some respects to other members of the Euphyllophytina such as Psilophyton and Franhueberia. Franhueberia gerriennei is also one of the earliest land plants described from the Early Devonian (late Emsian) that was known to have wood. Given the differences between Armoricaphyton and these other genera and a lack of a complete understanding of the whole plant, Armoricaphyton is currently classified as Euphyllophytina incertae sedis.

== See also ==
- Devonian
- List of Early Devonian land plants
- Polysporangiophytes
