= Hostinella =

Hostinella Temporal range: Late Silurian–Early Devonian

Scientific classification
- Kingdom: Plantae
- Clade: Tracheophytes
- Class: †Trimerophytopsida
- Order: †Trimerophytales
- Family: †Trimerophytaceae
- Genus: †Hostinella; Barrande (1868) ex Štúr (1882)

Type species
- Hostinella hostinensis Barrande (1882)

Species
- †H. bohemica Kräusel & Weyland 1932; †H. crispa Arnold 1939; †H. globosa Lang 1925; †H. heardii D.Edwards (1980); †H. hercynica Mägdefrau 1938; †H. hostinensis Barrande (1882); †H. racemosa Lang 1925; †H. racheneuri Ledoux-Marcelle 1927; †H. silurica Banks (1974); †H. strictissima Høeg 1942; †H. wahnbachensis Kräusel & Weyland 1935

Synonyms
- Hostimella (sic) Obrhel 1961

Form genus

Hostinella is a form genus, used for bare dichotomously branching stems (axes) which have not been found in association with spore-forming organs or sporangia and so cannot be assigned to a more precise genus or species. Specimens assigned to this genus have been found in Bathurst Island, Canada, in the Bertie Formation of Upper Silurian age (around 430 to 420 million years ago), where the stems are approximately 1.2 mm in diameter; and in Lower Devonian Senni beds (from around 420 to 390 million years ago) where the axes have a straited external appearance and contain xylem with tracheids (diameter: 40 μm).

It is known to co-occur with Krithodeophyton.
