= Amplectosporangium =

Amplectosporangium Temporal range: Pragian–Emsian

Scientific classification
- Kingdom: Plantae
- Clade: Tracheophytes
- Genus: †Amplectosporangium

Extinct genus of land plants

Amplectosporangium is a monotypic genus of extinct land plants found in Sichuan Province, China, that existed around 407 million years ago. A. jiangyouense, the only known species, is a leafless plant that consists of short-statured (to 7 cm) erect, dichotomous axes with terminal fertile branches. Short-stalked, oval-shaped sporangia are distributed in rows along the inner sides of the fertile branches. The linear arrangement of the sporangia in a cup-like fashion along the inner sides of the terminal fertile branches has been hypothesized to represent an early stage in the evolution of the seed coat or integument. While this arrangement of the spore-producing structures is similar to other polysporangiophytes like Eophyllophyton, a basal member of the euphyllophytes, the phylogenetic relationship of Amplectosprangium to other early land plants is uncertain. Hao and Xue in 2013 considered it to be an unplaced vascular plant (tracheophyte).

== See also ==
- Devonian
- List of Early Devonian land plants
- Polysporangiophytes
