= Bitelaria =

Bitelaria Temporal range: Early Devonian–Mid Devonian

Scientific classification
- Kingdom: Plantae
- Clade: Tracheophytes
- Genus: †Bitelaria; Istchenko and Istchenko, 1979

Synonyms
- Donotela fistulata Istchenko and Istchenko

Extinct genus of vascular plants

Bitelaria is a monospecific genus of extinct vascular plants described from outcrops of the Early Devonian Campbellton Formation in New Brunswick, Canada and Middle Devonian outcrops in the Voronezh region of Russia. B. dubjanski is characterized by thick-walled, dichotomously branched tubular axes and thick cuticles with possible lenticel-like eruptions. The unusual external morphology of the plant distinguishes it from other vascular plants and is thus placed in Tracheophyta incertae sedis.

== See also ==
- Devonian
- List of Early Devonian land plants
- Polysporangiophytes
