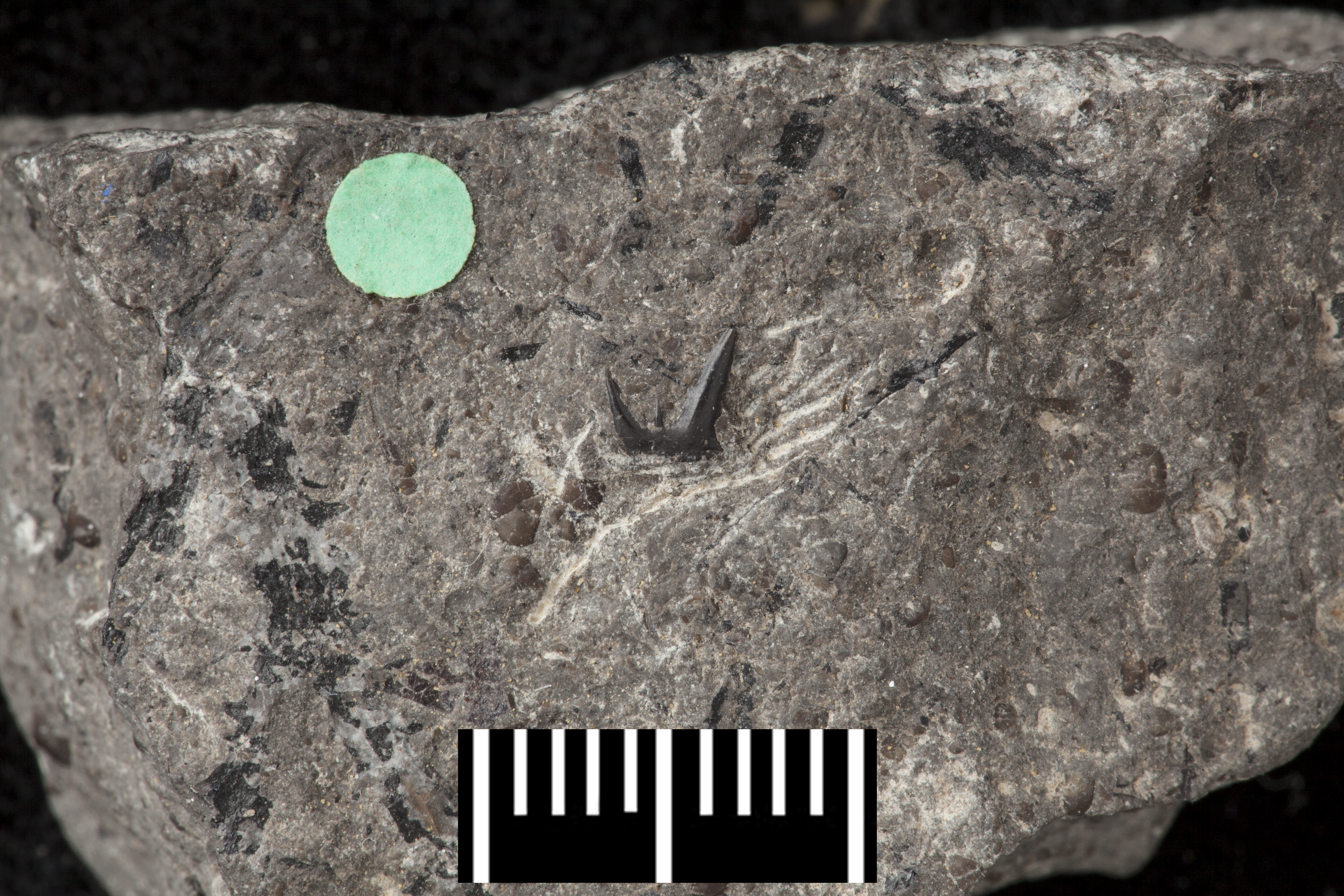
- The holotype tooth of Doliodus, originally Diplodus problematicus, in the collection of the Natural History Museum, London

Scientific classification
- Kingdom: Animalia
- Phylum: Chordata
- Class: Chondrichthyes
- Order: Omalodontiformes (?)
- Family: Omalodontidae (?)
- Genus: Doliodus Traquair (1893)

Type species
- Ctenacanthus latispinosus? Whiteaves, 1881

Synonyms
- Diplodus problematicus? Woodward, 1892

= Doliodus =

Doliodus Temporal range: Early Devonian (Emsian)

Extinct genus of cartilaginous fish

Doliodus is an extinct genus of cartilaginous fish known from the Early Devonian period of what is now New Brunswick, Canada. It includes a single named species, referred to either as D. problematicus or D. latispinosus, which was originally described based on isolated teeth and fin spines, but has since had a well-preserved body fossil assigned. The classification of the genus is uncertain, but it has been considered a member of the order Omalodontiformes. A more complete specimen that some authors assign to the genus shows features that are transitional between the extinct acanthodians and cartilaginous fish.

== Discovery and naming ==
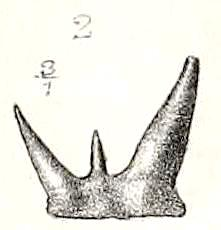
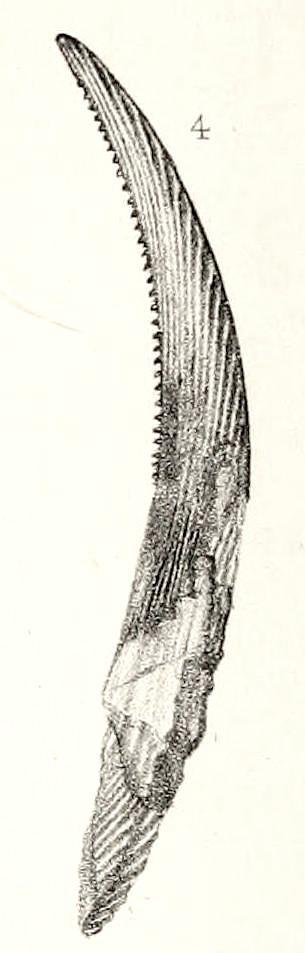
The holotype partial tooth (left) and an assigned pectoral fin spine (right) of Doliodus, illustrated by A. S. Woodward in 1892

The first material that some authors classify as Doliodus was identified by Joseph Whiteaves in 1881, and consists of several isolated fin spines which he identified as a new species in the genus Ctenacanthus, and which he named C. latispinosus. This species had no assigned holotype specimen. In 1889, these spines were suggested to instead belong to the genus Climatius by paleontologist Arthur Smith Woodward, who in 1892 also described a single, fragmentary tooth crown from the same locality (designated NHMUK PVP.6540) as the holotype of a new species in the now-disused cartilaginous fish genus Diplodus. (Note: The name Diplodus was preoccupied by a genus of sea bream, and the replacement name Didymodus was proposed by naturalist Edward Drinker Cope. This genus is itself now considered a synonym of Orthacanthus.) This species, which he named Diplodus problematicus, was reclassified as the new genus Doliodus problematicus the following year by paleontologist Ramsay Traquair based on 19 more complete teeth from the same site. A 2003 paper published in Nature by Randall Miller and coauthors described a fossilized cartilaginous fish with a well-preserved dentition, skull, fins, and trunk (designated as NBMG 10127) and tooth anatomy similar to that described by Woodward and Traquair in D. problematicus, and these authors assigned this specimen to that species.

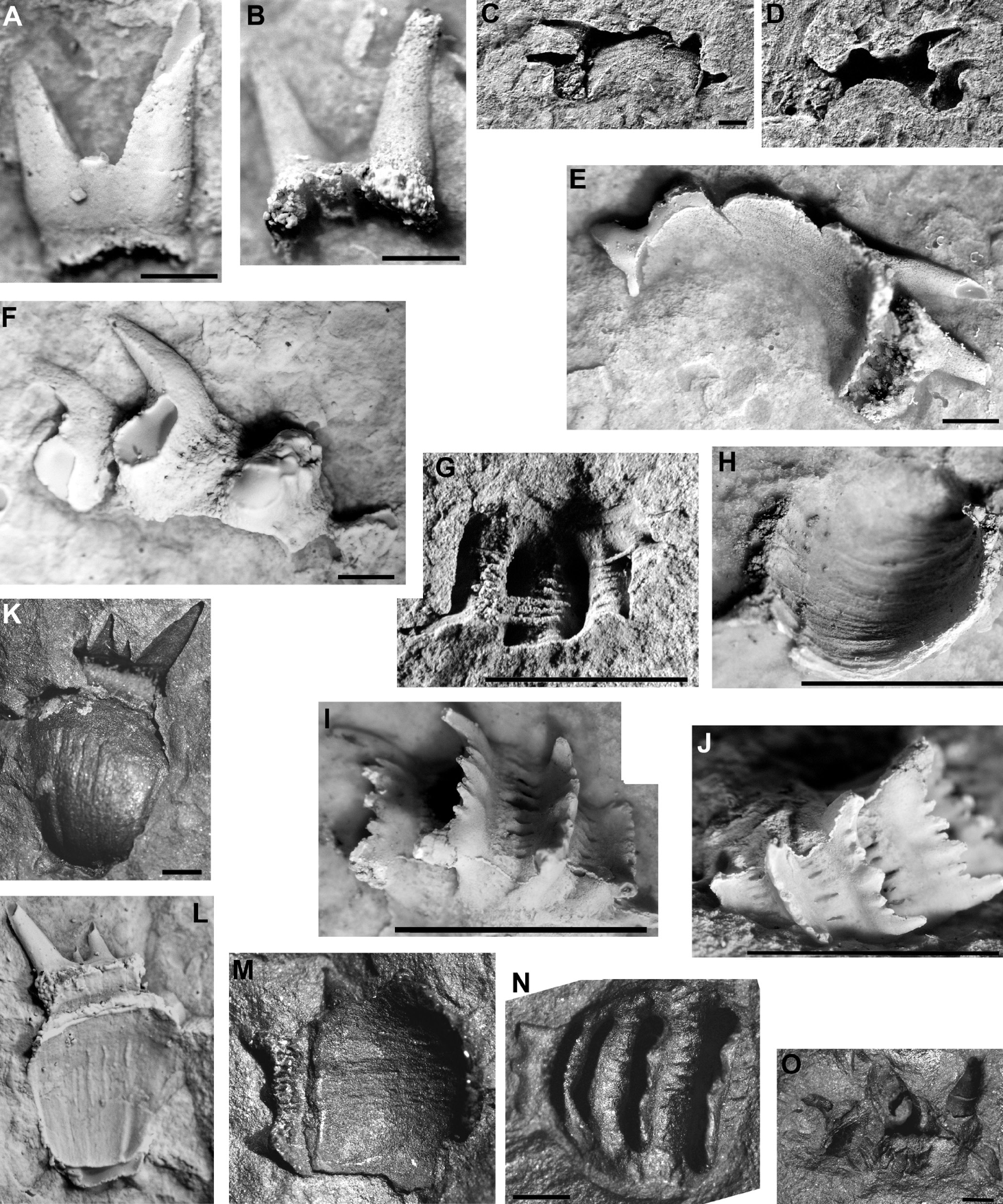
Teeth and tooth-whorls of Doliodus from the York River Formation of Gaspé, Quebec

The names Doliodus problematicus and Climatius latispinosus were used separately prior to the discovery of the articulated specimen, and in that material's description it was suggested further research was required to determine if the taxa were synonymous. Later studies found further evidence that the two belonged to the same species of animal, and a 2017 study by Carole Burrow and coauthors concluded that the name Doliodus latispinosus was correct due to that species being named earliest. Some subsequent researchers have continued to use the combination D. latispinosus to refer to a single species encompassing teeth, fin spines and skeletal material, while a 2023 paper by paleontologist Michal Ginter has instead questioned the assignment of any non-tooth material to Doliodus and restricted it to only the D. problematicus teeth.

The isolated fin spines described by Whiteaves, the teeth described by Woodward and Traquair, and the more complete skeleton all originate from the Campbellton Formation of Campbellton, New Brunswick. The site is dated to the Emsian stage of the Early Devonian, making these remains approximately 409-397 million years old. Additional spines and teeth assigned to the genus has been found in Gaspé, Quebec, in rocks of the York River Formation and Battery Point Formation, which are also dated to the Emsian stage. Michal Ginter includes the Quebecois teeth within the genus.

According to Traquair, the genus name is derived from the Greek root δόλιος or dolios, meaning to trick or deceive. The name was given because of how closely the tooth crowns of the genus resemble those of the unrelated Diplodus.

== Description ==
=== Teeth ===
Per Michal Ginter, the genus Doliodus encompasses only isolated teeth and tooth-whorls assigned to D. problematicus. These teeth had two large pointed cusps (termed diplodont) and smaller projections called cusplets situated between these. The dentition of the genus was heterodont, and two separate types of teeth were present in different regions of the mouth. Some teeth had only a single, smaller cusplet between the two main cusps, and may have been positioned at the front of the jaws, while other teeth had either three or occasionally four cusplets and were likely positioned further back in the mouth. The bases of the teeth were large and flattened, and these bases were connected so that the teeth were arranged in arched whorls of up to five tooth crowns. Like in some acanthodians, the teeth of Doliodus were composed of orthodentin and the base of either bone or osteodentin.

=== NBMG 10127 and spines ===
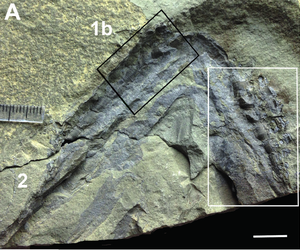
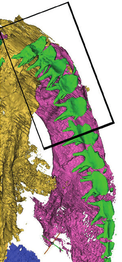
Photograph (left) and CT scan data (right) of the jaws and teeth of NBMG 10127. Scalebar is 1 cm

Per Miller and coauthors, Burrow and coauthors, and Maisey and coauthors, the anatomy of Doliodus (as D. latispinosus) is more completely understood. NBMG 10127 preserves the teeth and the front portion of the animal's cartilaginous skeleton in dorsal view. The dentition of this specimen differs from that of Doliodus as defined by Ginter, however, as although it is still heterodont there are three distinctive tooth families present, and it is uncertain if all teeth possess cusplets.

The head and body of NBMG 10127 is 23 cm long as preserved, and Miller and coauthors estimated a total length of 50 to 75 cm in their description of the specimen. The cartilaginous skeleton of the specimen may have been reinforced by mineralized tessellations like those of modern cartilaginous fish, although their presence is considered uncertain by some authors.

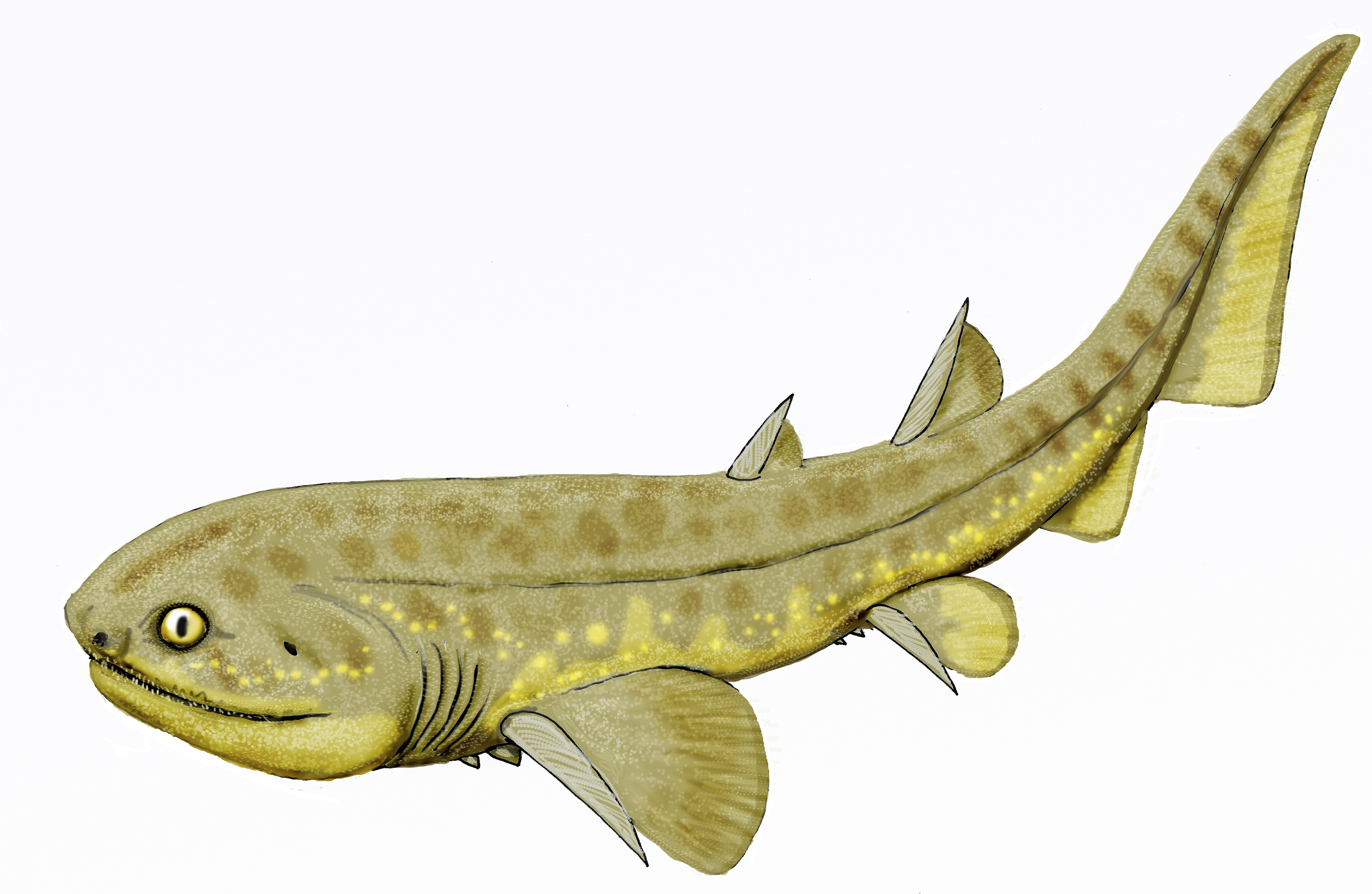
Life reconstruction of Doliodus, based on NBMG 10127 and showcasing fin spines

Long, curved, dentinous spines protruded from in front of the fins, and four sets of shorter paired spines were present on the underbelly; two sets of prepectoral and prepelvic spines, respectively. The spines had ridges which ran down their length, and the fin spines additionally had rows of denticles. The dorsal fins also likely had spines, but the dorsal fin of NBMG 10127 is poorly preserved. The pectoral spines of this specimen were 5.5 cm long, and the largest isolated spines assigned to D. latispinosus are up to 9 cm long.

== Classification ==
When first described material now assigned to Doliodus was classified as genera within the class Chondrichthyes or the then-equivalent Elasmobranchii, namely Ctenacanthus and a xenacanthiform. Shortly after, however, A. S. Woodward reclassified the fin spines of the genus as those of an acanthodian, and Ramsay Traquair noted that its teeth were very different from the xenacanth chondrichthyan teeth they were initially compared to, and likely belong in their own order. These teeth were considered to belong to the acanthodian order Ischnacanthiformes and the family Ischnacanthidae by subsequent authors.

Since the discovery of the more complete specimen, the genus has been considered a member of the family Omalodontiformes and the family Omalodontidae. It has alternatively been suggested that the genus lacks defining features of the Omalodontiformes, and some authors have considered it as Chondrichthyes incertae sedis (uncertain position) and have not assigned it to an order or family. While similarities between the assigned skull of Doliodus and members of the chondrichthyan subclass Elasmobranchii have been suggested, the genus is generally believed to be part of the Chondrichthyes stem-group and to have diverged earlier than the two living subclasses of chondrichthyans. Michal Ginter regards the articulated material and fin spines as belonging to either the omalodont genus Portalodus or a yet-unnamed genus with features intermediate between Portalodus and Doliodus, and he refers to the species tentatively as "Portalodus? latispinosus". Below is a simplified cladogram from Frey and coauthors (2020), whose phylogenetic analysis recovered Doliodus as a stem-group chondrichthyan.

- Conventionally-defined Chondrichthyes
  - Gladbachus
  - - - Gydoselache
      - Pucapampella
    - - Doliodus
      - Crown-group Chondrichthyes
        - Holocephali (chimaeras and kin)
        - Elasmobranchii (true sharks, rays, and kin)

=== Evolutionary significance ===
Specimen NBMG 10127 is a transitional form between cartilaginous fish and the now-extinct acanthodians. Researcher John Maisey has referred to the specimen as "... an acanthodian with a shark's head, pectoral skeleton, and teeth" in reference to its acanthodian-like fin spines and shark-like endoskeleton. The specimen also represents one of the oldest-known articulated cartilaginous fish alongside the Bolivian Pucapampella, with most older cartilaginous fish remains consisting only of isolated scales and teeth. In 2022, the much older Shenacanthus vermiformis from the Early Silurian of China was described, which may have been a more derived chondrichthyan than Doliodus or Pucapampella and may complicate the previously-assumed sequence of chondrichthyan evolution due to it sharing features with placoderm fishes.

== Paleoecology ==
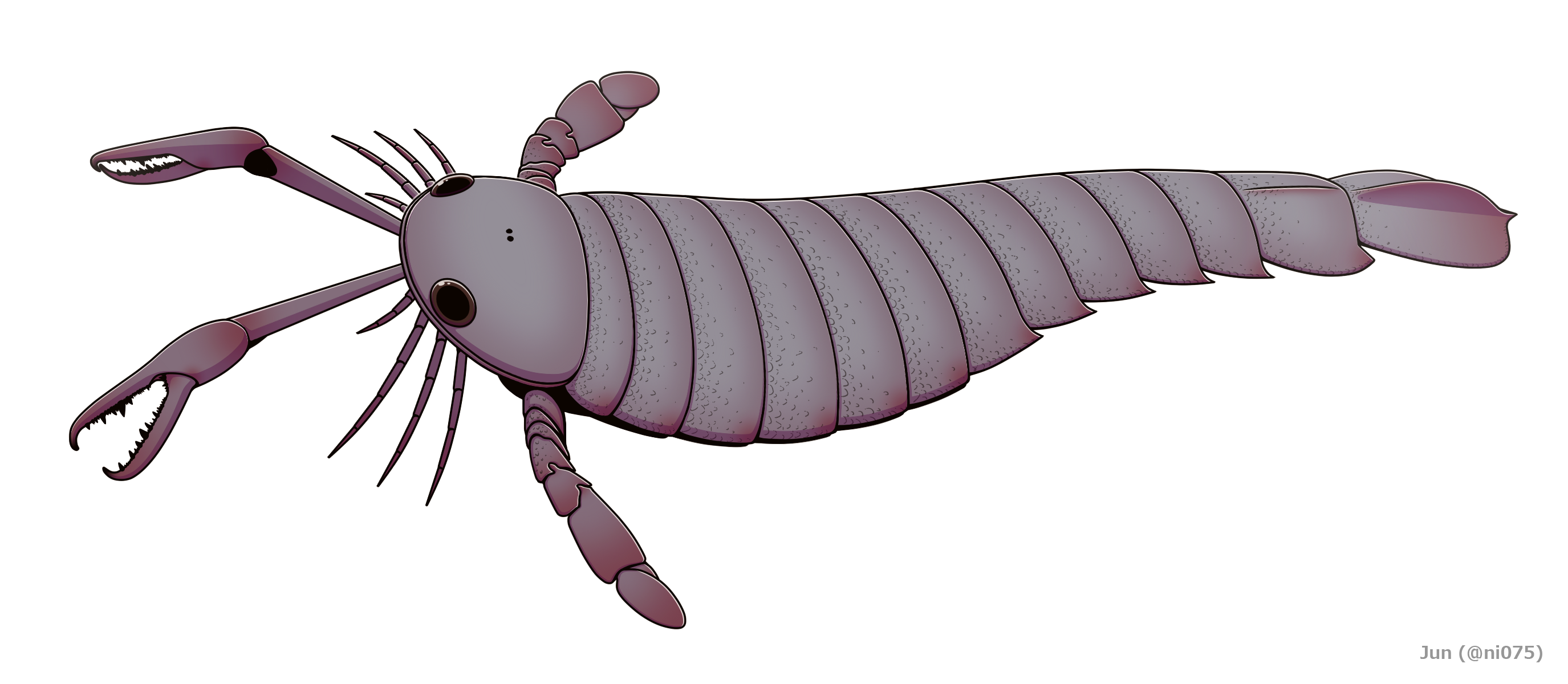
The eurypterid Pterygotus anglicus may have been the apex predator of the Atholville Beds

Specific layers of the Campbellton Formation which preserve Doliodus, termed the Atholville Beds, represented a shallow, coastal, probably deltaic environment with both terrestrial and marine influences. Doliodus remains are found throughout the formation, along with the remains of several other fish species, arthropods such as large eurypterids, and large amounts of fossilized plant material. The Battery Point and York River Formation deposits which preserve fish remains were laid down in similar deltaic, lagoonal environments. In life, Doliodus was potentially an active predator, which itself may have been hunted by larger predators such as the poorly-known chondrichthyan Protodus. The large eurypterid Pterygotus anglicus is thought to have been the apex predator of the Atholville Beds.

== See also ==
- List of acanthodian genera
- List of prehistoric cartilaginous fish genera
