= Gosslingiaceae =

Scientific classification
- Kingdom: Plantae
- Clade: Tracheophytes
- Clade: Lycophytes
- Plesion: †Zosterophylls
- Order: †incertae sedis
- Family: †Gosslingiaceae

Genera
- See text.

Extinct family of spore-bearing plants

Gosslingiaceae is a family of extinct zosterophylls. The zosterophylls were among the first vascular plants in the fossil record, and are considered to share an ancestor with the living lycophytes. The family is variously placed in the order Sawdoniales or the order Gosslingiales.

== Genera ==
Genera that have been placed in this family by Kenrick and Crane in 1997 and Hao and Xue in 2013 are shown in the table below.

Genus	Included by Hao & Xue	Included by Kenrick & Crane
†Crenaticaulis Banks & Davis (1969)	yes	placed in Sawdoniaceae
†Gosslingia Heard (1927)	yes	yes
†Oricilla Gensel (1982)	yes	yes
†Sawdonia Hueber (1971)	yes	placed in Sawdoniaceae
†Tarella	unplaced as to family	yes
