= Aphyllopteris =

Aphyllopteris Temporal range: Devonian

Scientific classification
- Kingdom: Plantae
- Division: incertae sedis
- Genus: †Aphyllopteris (Nathorst) C.A.Arnold, 1939

Species
- †Aphyllopteris delawarensis

Extinct genus of Devonian plants

Aphyllopteris is a poorly known genus of extinct Devonian land plants formerly placed in the Rhyniophytina. It is considered an artificial group for sterile naked axes that branch pseudomonopodially. Early Devonian records of this genus are found in Belgium, France, Norway, Poland, and Russia, and possibly Uzbekistan. Putative Middle to Late Devonian records of this genus include A. delawarensis reported from Frasnian outcrops in New York and Aphyllopteris sp. reported from the Givetian outcrops of the Beckers Butte Member of the Martin Formation in Arizona.

== See also ==
- List of Early Devonian land plants
- Polysporangiophyte
