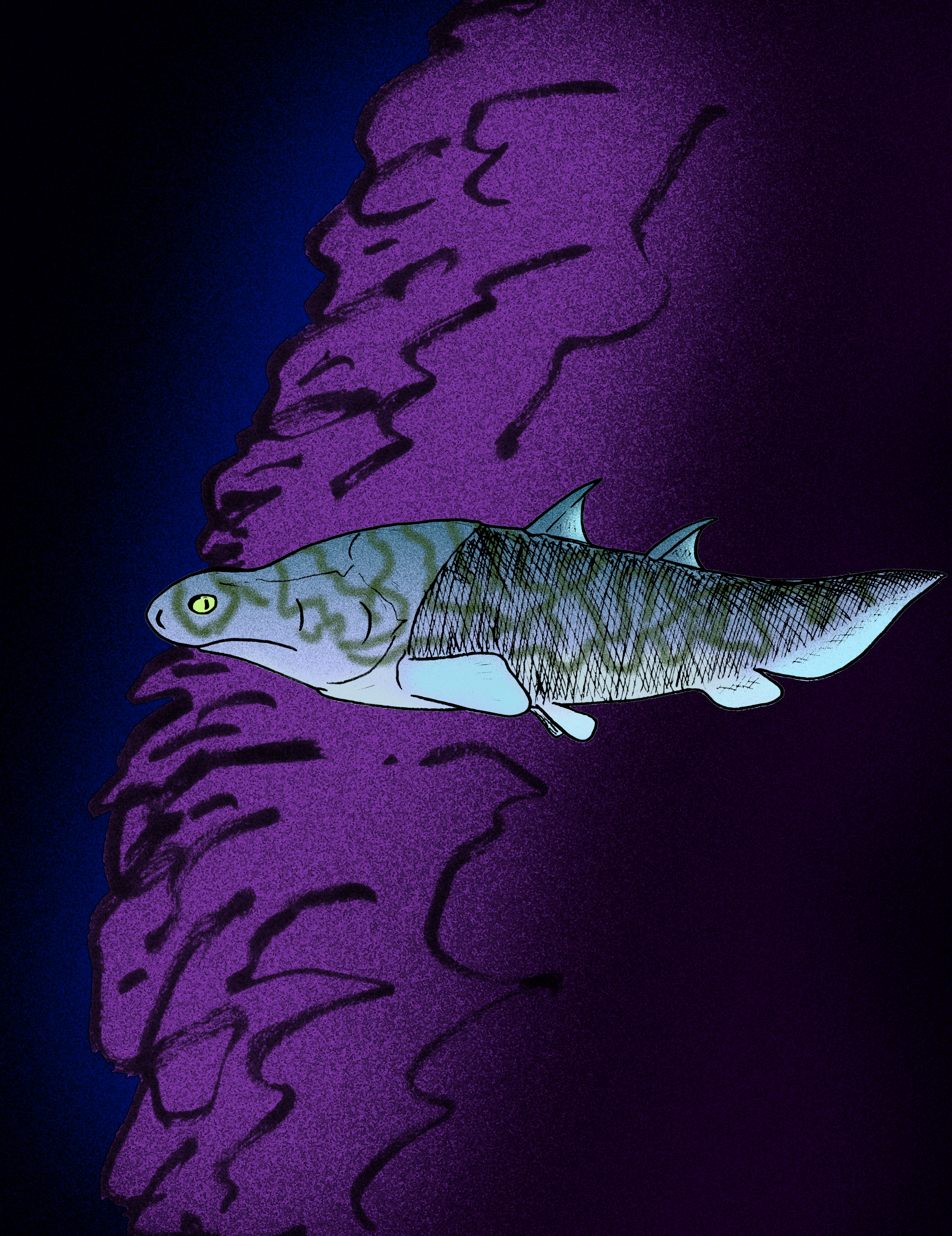
- Reconstruction of Shenacanthus

Scientific classification
- Kingdom: Animalia
- Phylum: Chordata
- Class: Chondrichthyes
- Genus: †Shenacanthus; Zhu et al, 2022
- Species: †S. vermiformis

Binomial name
- †Shenacanthus vermiformis Zhu et al, 2022

= Shenacanthus =

Shenacanthus Temporal range: Telychian

Extinct genus of chondrichthyan

Shenacanthus is a genus of chondrichthyan from the Huixingshao Formation of China. It contains one species, Shenacanthus vermiformis. It is one of the earliest known jawed vertebrates, at roughly 435 million years old. The genus is only known from one fossil of a near-complete fish.

== Description ==
Shenacanthus is roughly 2.2 cm (0.87 in) long, with a fusiform body shape like most other jawed fish. It shares many characteristics with chondrichthyans, specifically the posteriorly retracted gills, a lack of dermal bones around the jaw and small diamond-shaped scales. In addition, the lack of teeth and jaw plates, alongside the spineless paired fins (alongside a spineless putative anal fin), are similar to Early Devonian stem-chondrichthyans like Paucicanthus. Its pectoral region is unique for having relatively placoderm-like armour, with both lateral and ventral plates, alongside a large teardrop-shaped dorsal plate with worm-like ornaments. This large dorsal plate is preceded by a smaller plate towards the head, and a series of linearly ornamented scutes down the body interrupted by a dorsal spine. In phylogeny, Shenacanthus is consistently placed next to Paucicanthus and Doliodus near the top of the chondrichthyan stem. However, this placement is suspect due to the presence of placoderm-like dorsal armour.

== Etymology ==
Shenacanthus's genus name honours Congwen Shen, a distinguished writer who located their most famous story Border Town near the fossil site. The genus name also includes the Greek word acanthus, a common suffix for stem-chondrichthyan names meaning "spine". The species name vermiformis means "worm-like" in reference to the shape of the ornament on its dorsal plates.
