= Psilophytites =

Psilophytites Temporal range: Late Silurian–Pragian

Scientific classification
- Kingdom: Plantae
- Clade: Polysporangiophytes
- Division: incertae sedis
- Genus: †Psilophytites; Høeg (1952)

Species
- P. gileppensis Gerrienne (1992)

Form genus of extinct plants

Psilophytites is a form genus of extinct plants; it was created by Høeg for spiny stems (axes) which cannot be assigned to a more precise genus or species, usually because spore-forming organs or sporangia are not present.

Fossils which have been placed in this genus have been found, among other locations, in Wales in formations of Late Silurian age (Přídolí, around 427 to 420 million years ago); in the Wutubulake Formation in Xinjiang, China, of the same age; in the Paraná basin, Brazil, from the Early Devonian (Lochkovian, around 420 to 413 million years ago); and in Belgium from an outcrop of Early Devonian age (Lochkovian–Pragian, around 420 to 411 million years ago).

Gerrienne named a new species, P. gileppensis, on the basis of the Belgian fossils, which were the oldest spiny plants found in that country. Their stems were equally or unequally dichotomously branched, bearing spreading spines which were long, narrow and undivided. A very spiny stem was sometimes found at the point of division of two other stems. As no sporangia were found and the internal structure of the stems is unknown, they were placed in Psilophytites.

Banks considered that specimens assigned to Psilophytites could be a mixture of zosterophylls and trimerophytes.
