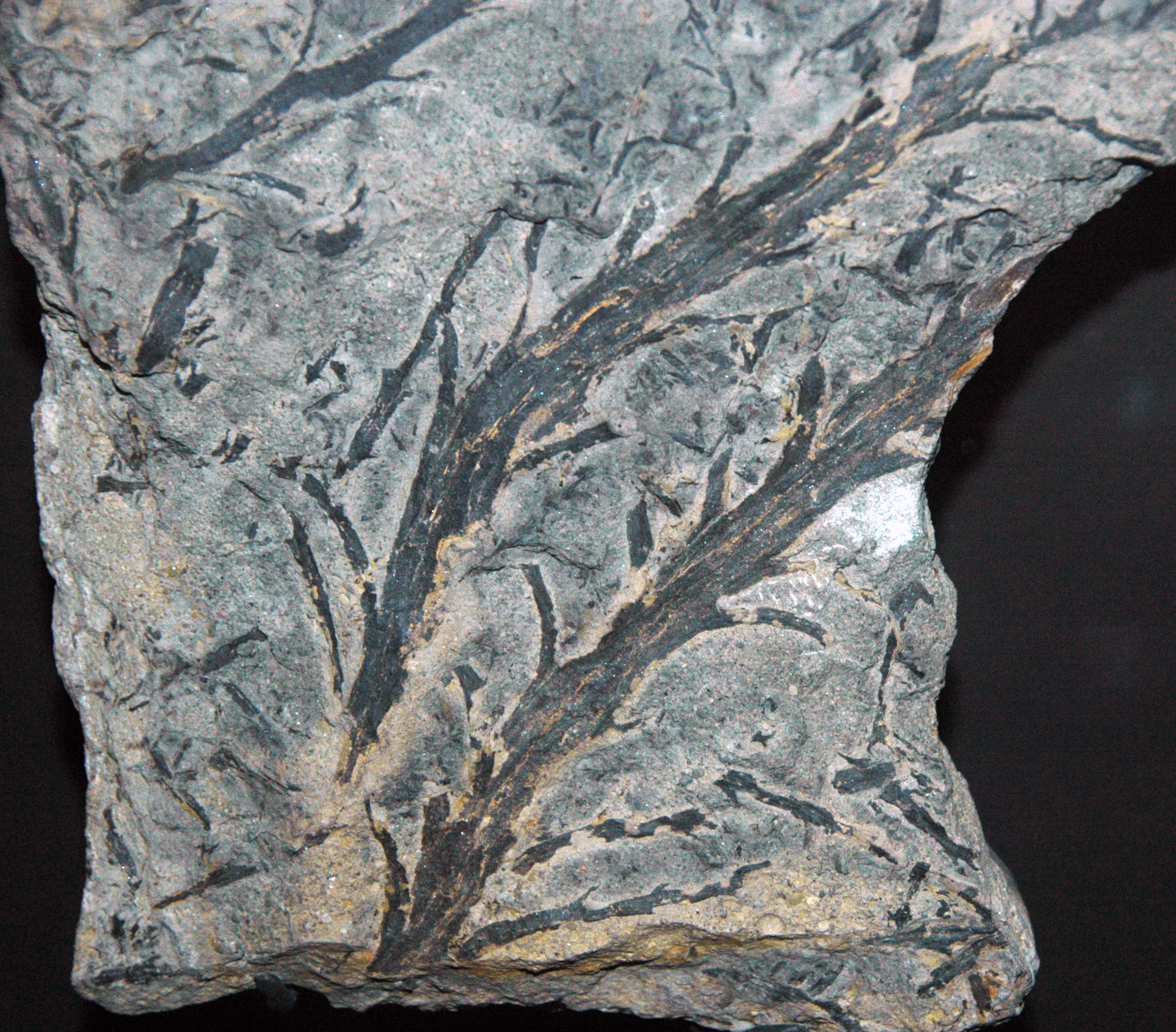
- Chaleuria cirrosa from the Lower Devonian of New Brunswick

Scientific classification
- Kingdom: Plantae
- Clade: Tracheophytes
- Class: †Progymnospermopsida
- Genus: †Chaleuria; H.N.Andrews, Gensel & W.H. Forbes
- Species: †C. cirrosa

Binomial name
- †Chaleuria cirrosa H.N.Andrews, Gensel & W.H. Forbes

= Chaleuria =

Chaleuria Temporal range: Middle Devonian

Extinct genus of Devonian plants

Chaleuria is a genus of extinct plants, found as fossils in New Brunswick, Canada. The rocks in which it was found are of Middle Devonian age (393 to 382 million years ago). One species has been described, Chaleuria cirrosa. It was heterosporous, i.e. the spores were of two distinct sizes. Small spores (microspores) were in the size range 30–48 μm, large spores in the range 60–156 μm. Both kinds of spore were found in the same sporangium, although one size group tended to predominate in each sporangium. The original describers "tentatively" regarded the genus as a primitive member of the progymnosperms. In 2013, Hao and Xue listed the genus as a progymnosperm.
