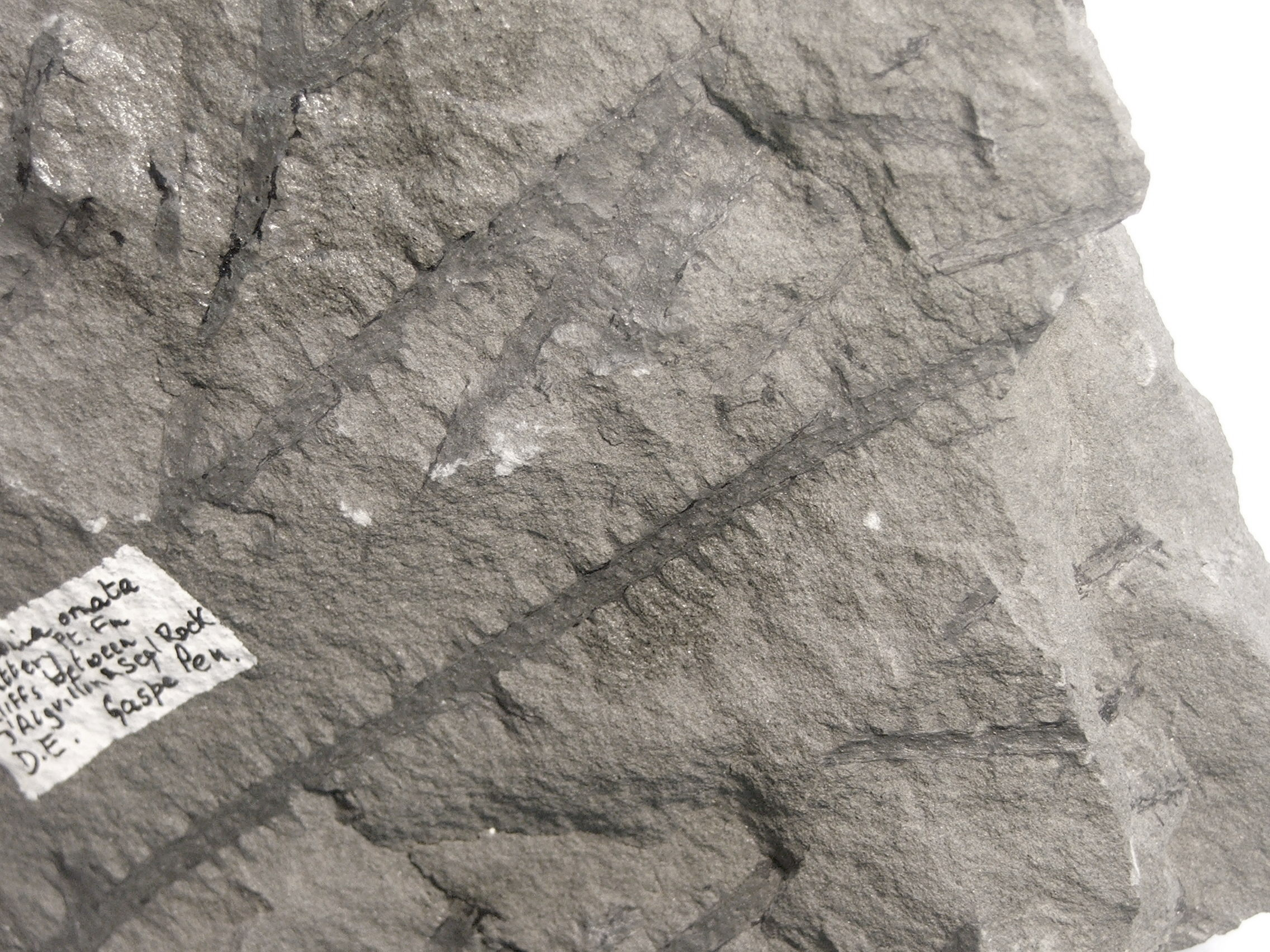
- Sawdonia ornata

Scientific classification
- Kingdom: Plantae
- Clade: Tracheophytes
- Clade: Lycophytes
- Plesion: †Zosterophylls
- Order: †Sawdoniales

Families
- See text.

= Sawdoniales =

Sawdoniales Temporal range: Upper Silurian–Lower Carboniferous
- Sawdonia ornata with ground creeping roots (A); lateral reniform sporangia (B)

Extinct order of spore-bearing plants

The Sawdoniales are an order or plesion of extinct zosterophylls. The zosterophylls were among the first vascular plants in the fossil record, and share an ancestor with the living lycophytes. The group has been divided up in various ways. In their major cladistic study of early land plants, Kenrick and Crane placed most of the zosterophylls in the Sawdoniales (which they treated as a plesion).

Like other zosterophylls, members of the Sawdoniales bore lateral, reniform sporangia. They branched dichotomously, and grew at the ends by unrolling (circinate vernation). Some had smooth stems, others were covered in small spines; fungal bodies have been reported in some spines.

== Taxonomy ==
In 1997, Kenrick and Crane placed most of the zosterophylls in the plesion Sawdoniales, characterizing the group as having "marked bilateral symmetry". Their summary cladogram did not resolve the taxa within the Sawdoniales, other than placing Zosterophyllum divaricatum within the zosterophylls but outside the Sawdoniales. Hao and Xue in 2013 criticized their approach, and placed many of the members of Kenrick and Crane's Sawdoniales in the order Gosslingiales, characterized among other features by the absence of terminal sporangia (i.e. with only lateral sporangia), and hence indeterminate growth.

=== Families ===
In Kenrick and Crane's treatment, the Sawdoniales are divided into four families:

- †Gosslingiaceae
- †Sawdoniaceae
- †Barinophytaceae
- †Hsuaceae

Hao and Xue place the first two families in their Gosslingiales, but exclude both the Barinophytaceae and the Hsuaceae from the zosterophylls.

== Bibliography ==
- Hao, Shougang & Xue, Jinzhuang (2013), The early Devonian Posongchong flora of Yunnan: a contribution to an understanding of the evolution and early diversification of vascular plants, Beijing: Science Press, ISBN 978-7-03-036616-0
- Kenrick, Paul & Crane, Peter R. (1997). The Origin and Early Diversification of Land Plants: A Cladistic Study. Washington, D.C.: Smithsonian Institution Press. ISBN 978-1-56098-730-7.
