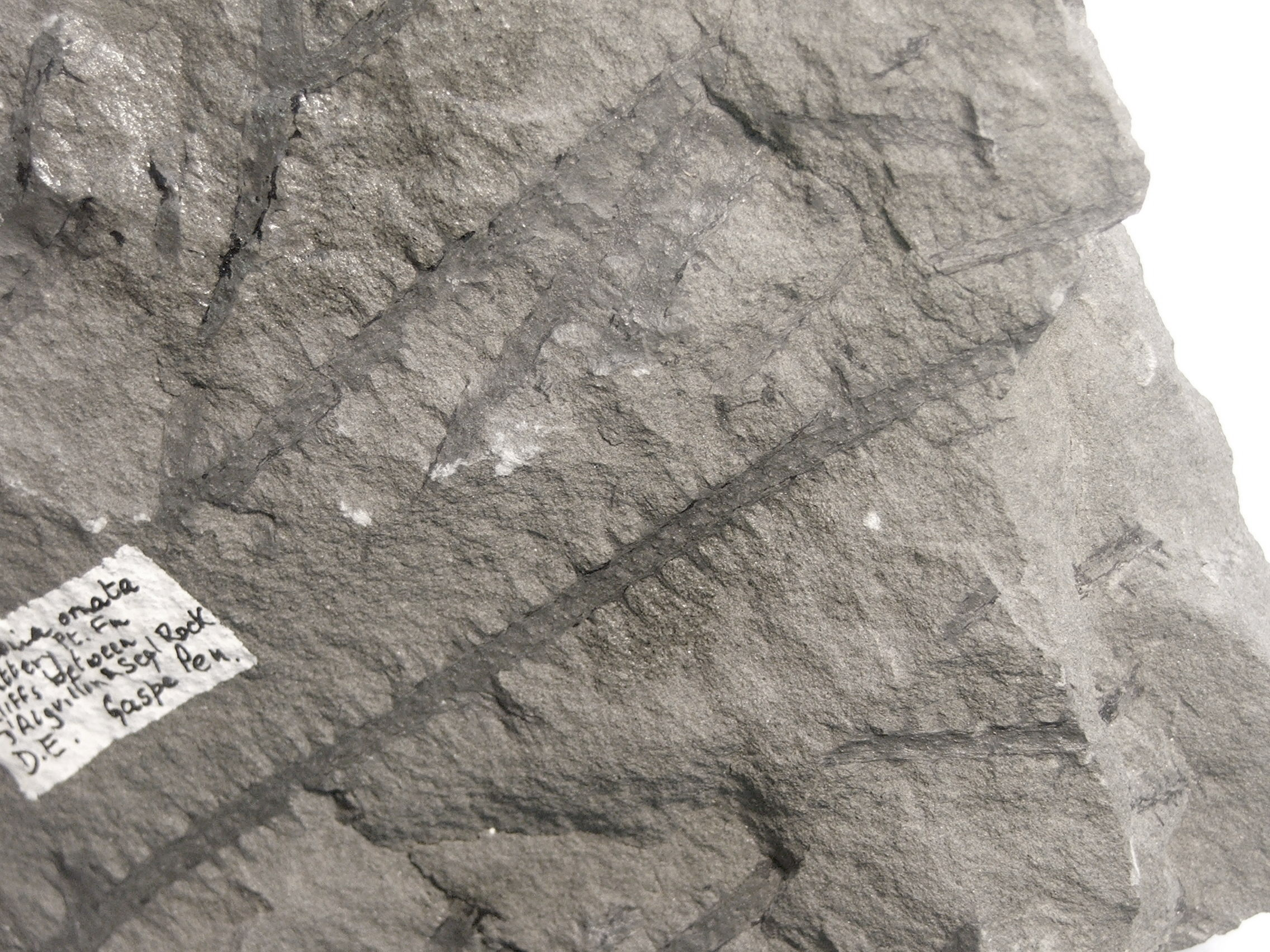
- Sawdonia ornata

Scientific classification
- Kingdom: Plantae
- Clade: Tracheophytes
- Clade: Lycophytes
- Plesion: †Zosterophylls
- Order: †Sawdoniales
- Family: †Sawdoniaceae

Genera
- See text.

= Sawdoniaceae =

Extinct family of spore-bearing plants

Sawdoniaceae is a family of extinct zosterophylls. The zosterophylls were among the first vascular plants in the fossil record, and are considered to share an ancestor with the living lycophytes. The family is recognized by some sources, and placed in the Sawdoniales. Other sources do not recognize the family, and place some of its members in the family Gosslingiaceae.

== Genera ==
Genera that have been placed in this family by Kenrick and Crane in 1997 are shown in the table below, along with their treatment by Hao and Xue in 2013.

Genus	Hao & Xue (2013)
†Crenaticaulis Banks & Davis	Gosslingiaceae
†Sawdonia Hueber	Gosslingiaceae
†Konioria Zdebska	incertae sedis
†Anisophyton	unplaced as to family
†Deheubarthia	unplaced as to family
†Serrulacaulis	unplaced as to family
