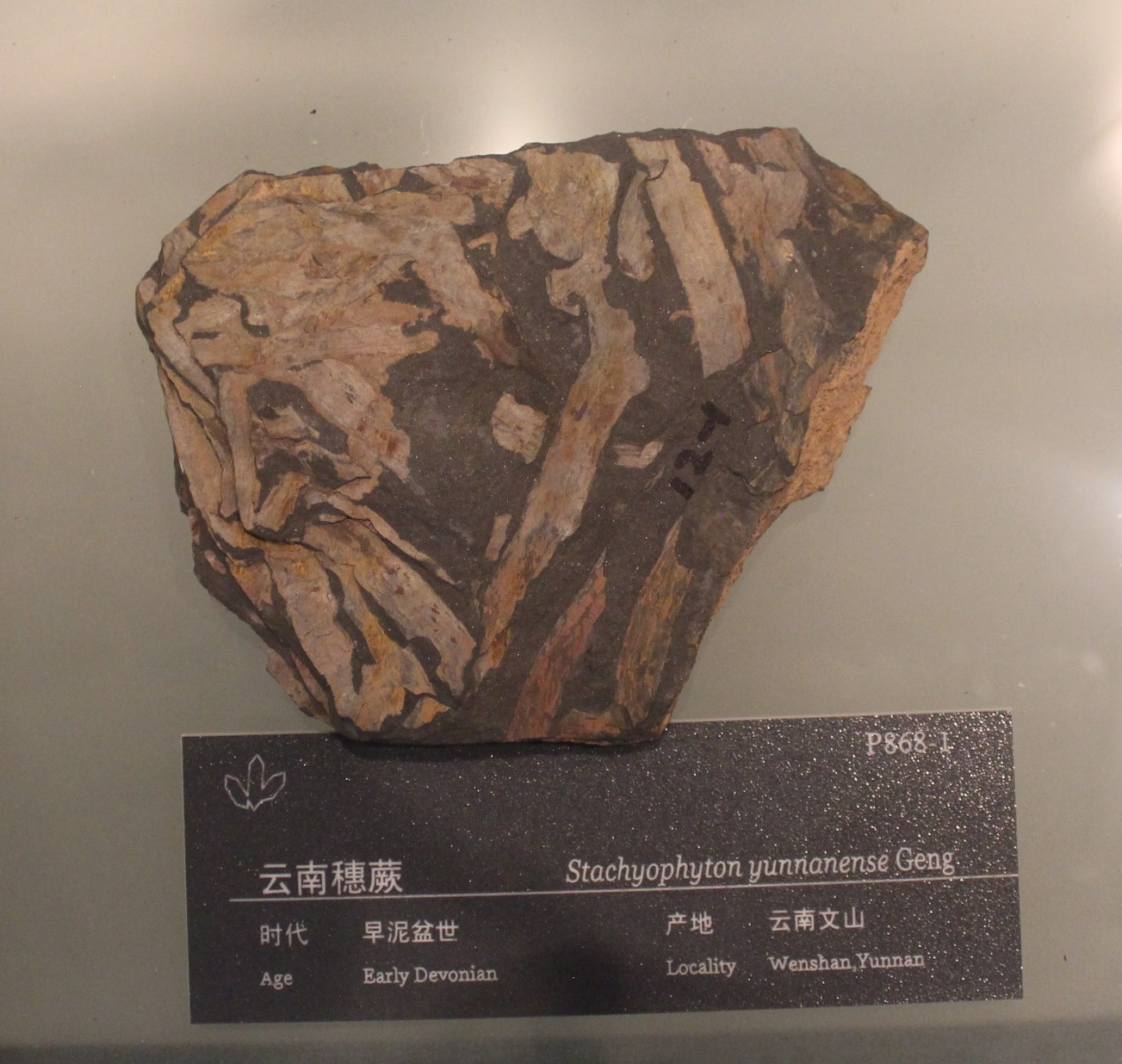
- S. yunnanense, Geological Museum of China

Scientific classification
- Kingdom: Plantae
- Clade: Tracheophytes
- Genus: †Stachyophyton; B.-Y. Geng

Species
- S. yunnanense B.-Y. Geng

= Stachyophyton =

Stachyophyton Temporal range: Pragian

Extinct genus of vascular plants

Stachyophyton is a genus of extinct vascular plants known from fossils found in the Posongchong Formation, Wenshan district, Yunnan, China, in deposits of Early Devonian age (Pragian, around 410 million years ago).
