= Guangnania =

Guangnania Temporal range: Pragian–Emsian

Scientific classification
- Kingdom: Plantae
- Clade: Tracheophytes
- Clade: Lycophytes
- Plesion: †Zosterophylls (?)
- Genus: †Guangnania; D.-M.Wang & S.-G.Hao, 2002
- Species: †G. cuneata

Binomial name
- †Guangnania cuneata D.-M.Wang & S.-G.Hao, 2002

Extinct land plant genus

Guangnania was a genus of Early Devonian land plant with branching axes. It is thought to be related to the zosterophylls.
