= Polythecophyton =

Polythecophyton Temporal range: Pragian

Scientific classification
- Kingdom: Plantae
- Clade: Tracheophytes
- Clade: Euphyllophytes
- Genus: †Polythecophyton; S.-G. Hao, P.G. Gensel & D.-M. Wang (2001)
- Species: †P. demissum

Binomial name
- †Polythecophyton demissum S.-G. Hao, P.G. Gensel & D.-M. Wang (2001)

Extinct genus of plants

Polythecophyton was a genus of Early Devonian (420 to 390 million years ago) aneurophyte with branching axes, drooping, many-branched sporangia, but no trace of a vascular system. It grew to several centimetres in length, and its axes were almost a centimeter across.
