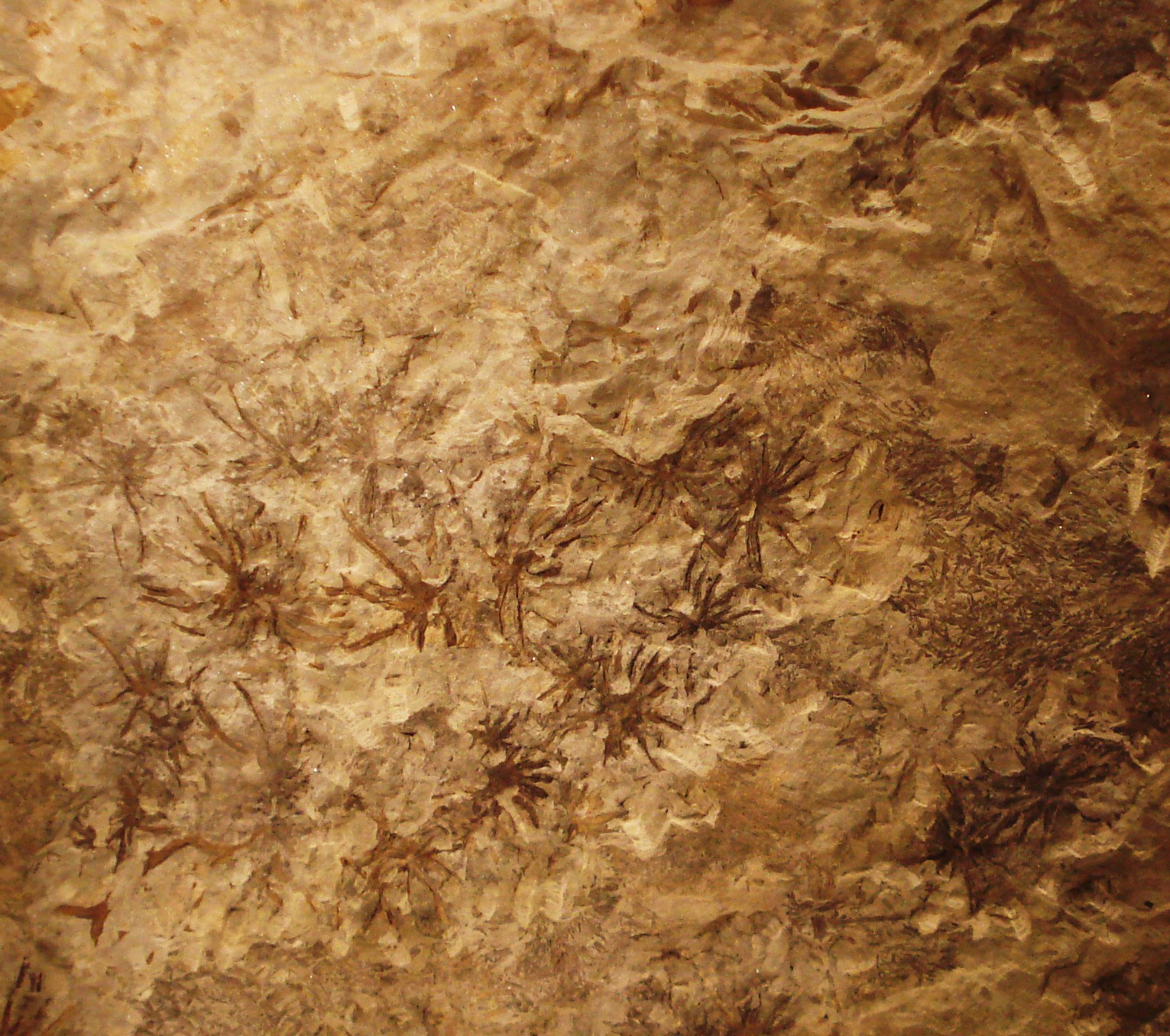
- Sciadophyton fossil on display at the Museum of Man and Nature

Scientific classification
- Kingdom: Plantae
- Clade: Tracheophytes
- Subdivision: †Rhyniophytina
- Class: †Rhyniopsida
- Order: †Rhyniales
- Family: †Rhyniaceae
- Genus: †Sciadophyton; Steinrnann 1930

= Sciadophyton =

Sciadophyton Temporal range: Early Devonian

Extinct genus of Devonian plants

Sciadophyton is a morphotaxon of lower Devonian plants known only from compression fossils. It is interpreted as the monoicous gametophyte of a vascular land plant, because its vascularised branches end in a cup-shaped structure bearing gametangia, both antheridia and archegonia, but little structural information is preserved at the cellular level. It formed rosettes of stems, which may have radiated from a basal gametophytic corm-like thallus or from a central 'stem' or even from a root system, although there is not enough evidence to discriminate between these possibilities.
