= Malba =

Malba can refer to:

- Malba, Queens, a neighborhood of New York City
- Malba Department, Poni Province, Burkina Faso, a department or commune
- Birifor people, also known as Malba, an ethnic group in West Africa
- Malba Tahan, a fictitious Persian scholar, frequent pen name of Brazilian author Júlio César de Mello e Souza
- MALBA, the Latin American Art Museum of Buenos Aires (Museo de Arte Latinoamericano de Buenos Aires)
