= Grisellatheca =

Grisellatheca Temporal range: Early Devonian

Scientific classification
- Kingdom: Plantae
- Clade: Embryophytes
- Genus: †Grisellatheca; D.Edwards, C.H.Wellman & L.Axe, 1999
- Species: †G. sulopensis

Binomial name
- †Grisellatheca sulopensis D.Edwards, C.H.Wellman & L.Axe, 1999

Extinct genus of plants

Grisellatheca was a genus of land plant with branching axes. It is known from charcoalified Early Devonian deposits, its type locality being the Brown Clee Hill lagerstatten. Its Terahedraletes spores form permanent tetrads.

Grisellatheca's internal anatomy comprises banded tubes, but it lacked an external cuticle. It shows some liverwort characteristics, and is hesitantly assigned to this group.
