= Krithodeophyton =

Krithodeophyton Temporal range: Early Devonian

Scientific classification
- Kingdom: Plantae
- Clade: Tracheophytes
- Clade: †Barinophytes
- Genus: †Krithodeophyton; D.Edwards
- Species: †K. croftii

Binomial name
- †Krithodeophyton croftii D.Edwards (1968)

Extinct genus of Devonian plants

Krithodeophyton is a genus of lower Devonian plant with branching axes. It is considered to be a barinophyte.

== Phylogeny ==
The phylogenetic position of the barinophytes remains disputed. Kenrick and Crane in 1997 called the group the Barinophytaceae and placed it in their Sawdoniales, well nested within the zosterophylls. Taylor et al. in 2009 considered the barinophytes to be possible lycopsids rather than zosterophylls. Hao and Xue in 2013 suggested that they were not lycopsids, instead falling between this group and the euphyllophytes.
