= Odonax =

Odonax Temporal range: Early Devonian

Scientific classification
- Kingdom: Plantae
- Clade: Tracheophytes
- Clade: Lycophytes
- Plesion: †Zosterophylls
- Genus: †Odonax; P.Gerrienne, 1996
- Species: †O. borealis

Binomial name
- †Odonax borealis P.Gerrienne, 1966

Extinct genus of spore-bearing plants

Odonax was a genus of Early Devonian (Early Emsian) zosterophyll with branching axes. It bore kidney-shaped sporangia and spiny branches.
