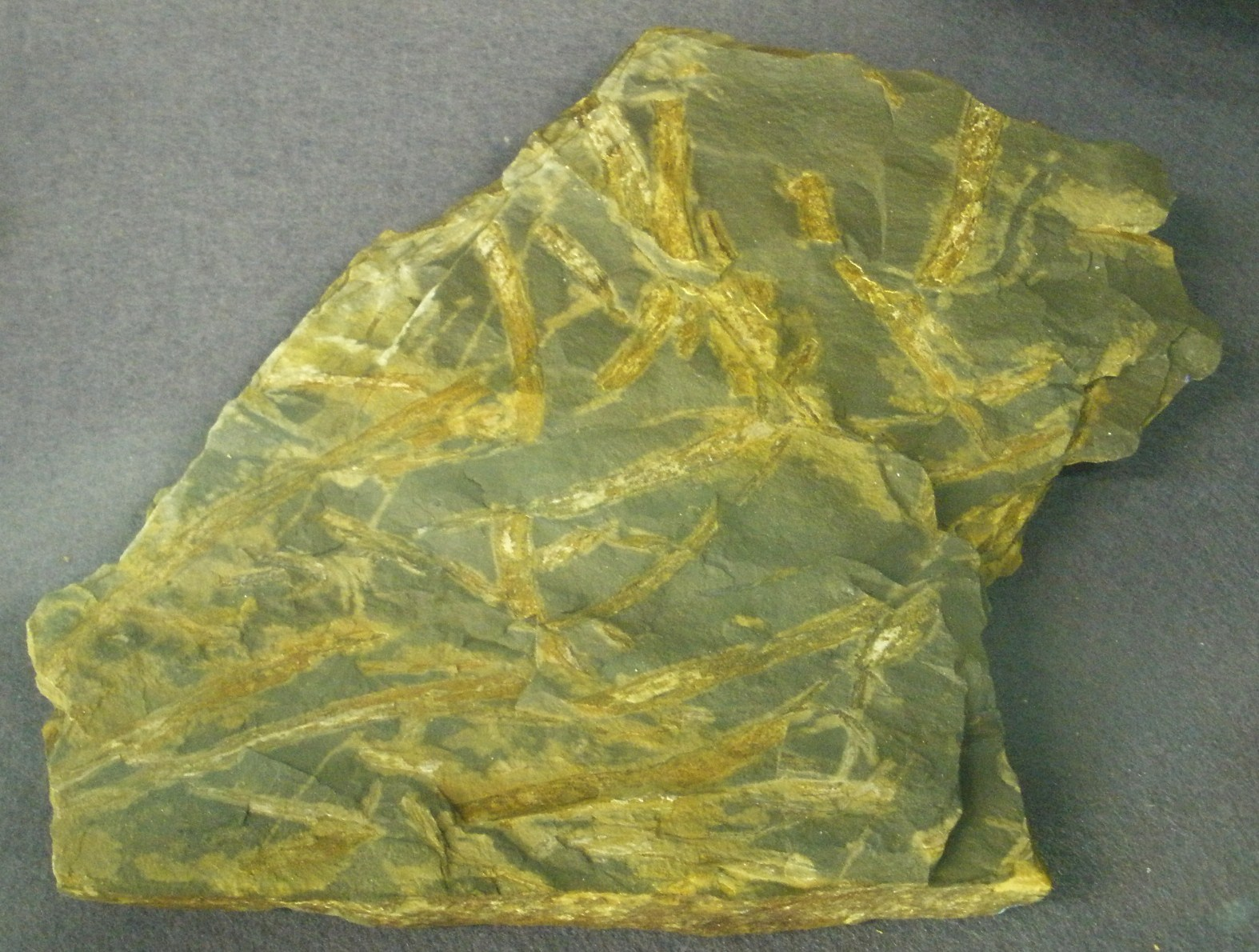
- Taeniocrada decheniana

Scientific classification
- Kingdom: Plantae
- Clade: Tracheophytes (?)
- Genus: †Taeniocrada; D. White

Species
- T. decheniana (Goep.) Kräusel & Weyland (1930); T. dubia Kräusel & Weyland (1930); T. elschanica Chirkova-Zalesskaja (1957); T. gracilis Chirkova-Zalesskaja (1957); T. latissima Senkevitsch (1978); T. lesquereuxii White (1902); T. orientalis Radchenko in Lepjechina et al. (1962); T. pilosa Senkevitsch (1978); T.(?) spitsbergensis Høeg (1942); T. stilesvillensis Taylor (1986); T. timanica Chirkova-Zalesskaja (1957); T. tuviensis; List taken from Taylor (1986).

= Taeniocrada =

Taeniocrada Temporal range: Devonian

Extinct genus of Devonian plants

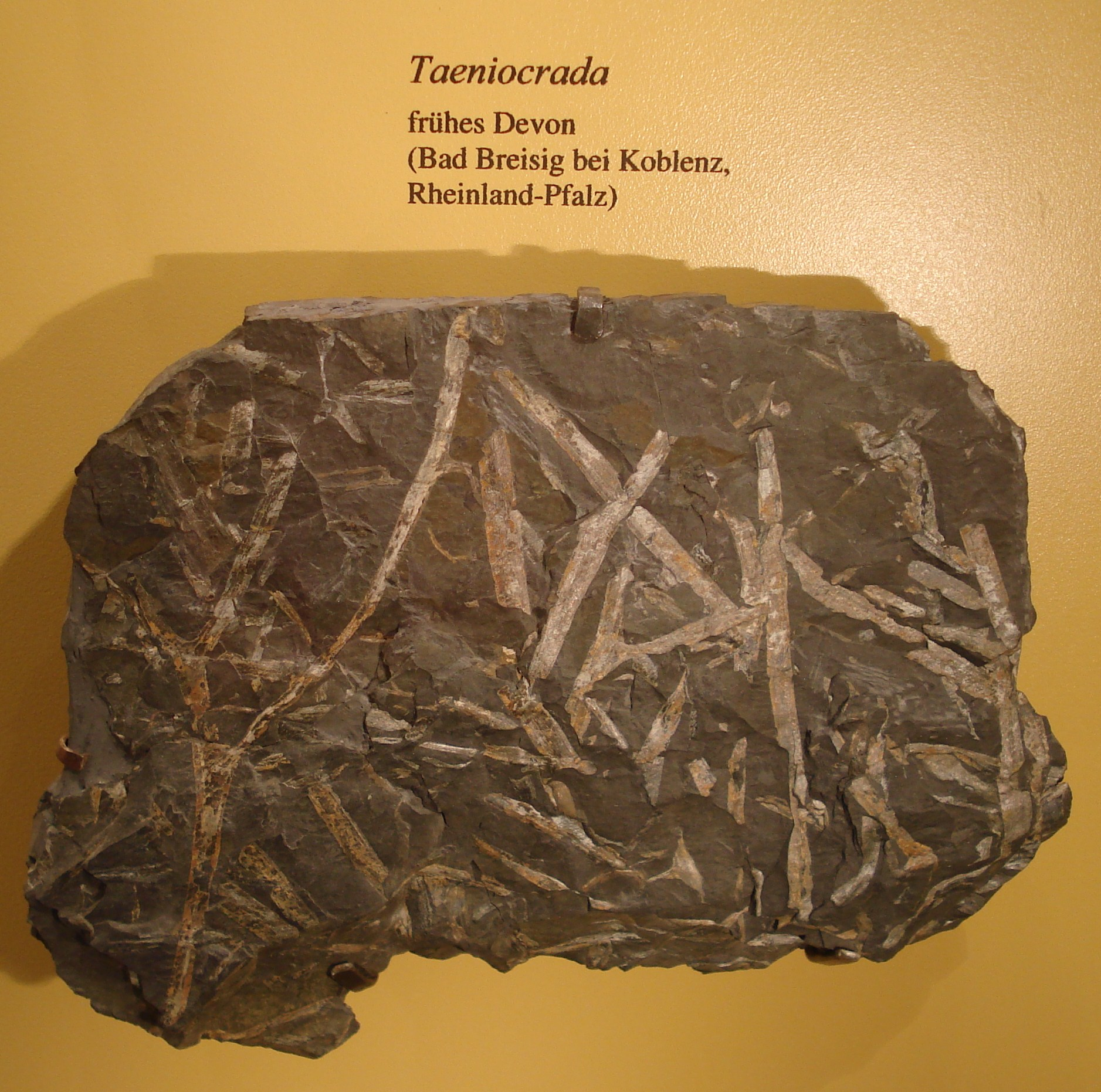

Taeniocrada is a genus of extinct plants of Devonian age (420 to 360 million years ago). It is used as a form genus for fossil plants with leafless flattened stems which divided dichotomously and had prominent midribs regarded as containing vascular tissues. It has been suggested that some species assigned to this genus were aquatic.

== Description ==
Key features of the original definition of the genus Taeniocrada were that it possessed leafless flattened stems with prominent midribs which appeared to contain vascular tissues. As more species were added to the genus, its definition became less clear. Three of the better-known species are T. decheniana, T. dubia, and T. stilesvillensis.

Taeniocrada decheniana, from the Lower Devonian, had separate fertile stems which repeatedly branched in a dichotomous fashion ending in sporangia between 3 and 7 mm long. A few sporangia were borne on the sides of stems. The species was found in dense stands. It has been suggested that it was aquatic or semi-aquatic because it apparently did not have stomata on the flattened stems.

Taeniocrada dubia, from the Lower Devonian, was originally considered to be a rhyniophyte, i.e. a very early vascular plant, but this has been questioned. The central strand appears to have been composed of tubes of differing diameters with helical thickenings which were part of the original cell wall, rather than being produced as the cell matured as would be the case in the xylem of vascular plants.

Taeniocrada stilesvillensis, from the Upper Devonian of New York, had stems which divided either into two equal branches (i.e. dichotomously) or so that one branch was more of a 'main stem' than the other (i.e. pseudomonopodially). Ridges along the stem bore hair-like structures. True vascular tissue was present.

A further nine species still considered to be part of the genus are listed and in some cases briefly described by Taylor (1986).

== Taxonomy ==
The genus Taeniocrada has a somewhat complex taxonomic history. It was created by White with the species T. lesquereuxii for fossils previously regarded as algae but which proved to have vascular tissue. (The date of creation is variously given as 1902, 1903 and 1913.) It was basically a form genus, used for fossil plants with flattened membrane-like stems, which were leafless with a prominent central thickened strand and which showed dichotomous branching. In 1986 Taylor noted that as more species had been added to the genus, the characters it possessed became wider, so that some species had sporangia which were at the ends of stems (terminal), others had sporangia borne on the sides of stems (lateral). Some species had smooth stems, other had stems with 'emergences' (e.g. spines or hairs). Some were known to have vascular tissue, others not. He concluded that the genus no longer matched any existing description and that its species probably belonged to more than one genus. He also suggested that the flattening of the stems might be artefacts of preservation.

In 1985, Fairon-Demaret created a new genus for fossils previously assigned to Taeniocrada but which had single lateral sporangia. She transferred T. langii (named by Stockmans in 1939) to Stockmansella langii, leaving Taeniocrada for fossil plants with terminal sporangia borne on branched structures.

== Phylogeny ==
Following Taylor (1986), Crane et al. (2004) regard Taeniocrada as a polyphyletic genus (i.e. a mixture of species with no close common ancestor). Some species may belong to the Rhyniopsida as defined by Kenrick and Crane.
