= Demersatheca =

Demersatheca Temporal range: Early Devonian

Scientific classification
- Kingdom: Plantae
- Clade: Tracheophytes
- Genus: †Demersatheca; C.S.Li & D.Edwards (1996)

Species
- D. contigua (C.S.Li & C.-Y. Cai) C.S.Li & D.Edwards (1996)

Extinct genus of vascular plants

Demersatheca is a genus of extinct vascular plants of the Early Devonian (Pragian, around 410 million years ago). Fossils were first found in the Posongchong Formation of eastern Yunnan, China. The plant had smooth leafless stems at least 1 mm in diameter, but only regions which bore spore-forming organs or sporangia are well-known. Sporangia were borne in 'spikes' or strobili, at least 40 mm long; one had 32 sporangia. Sporangia were arranged in four rows, two sporangia being opposite to one another on the stem with the next two being at right angles. Each sporangium consisted of two 'valves' which opened at the top to release their spores. A particular feature of Demersatheca which distinguishes it from other zosterophylls is that the stalk-less sporangia were sunken into the stem of the spike, so that the outer valve was flush with the surface.

== Taxonomy ==
D. contigua was initially called Zosterophyllum contiguum by Li and Cai, based on parts of two spikes (strobili) of sporangia. When further specimens were found, a review by Li and Edwards agreed that the plant was a zosterophyll, but decided that the sunken sporangia and the absence of sporangial stalks were sufficient to require a new genus, Demersatheca. The name is derived from demersus, Latin for sunken, and theca, Latin for container, referring to the organization of the sporangia. Hao and Xue in 2013 considered the genus as incertae sedis within the tracheophytes (vascular plants).
