= Danziella =

Danziella Temporal range: Pragian–Emsian

Scientific classification
- Kingdom: Plantae
- Clade: Tracheophytes
- Clade: Lycophytes
- Plesion: †Zosterophylls (?)
- Genus: †Danziella; D.Edwards (2006)

Species
- D. artesiana (Danzé-Corsin) D.Edwards (2006)

Extinct genus of spore-bearing plants

Danziella is a genus of extinct vascular plants of the Early Devonian (around 420 to 390 million years ago). Fossils found in the Artois region of northern France were first described as Zosterophyllum artesianum, but a later review by Edwards showed that they did not fit the circumscription of that genus.

== Description ==
Compressed fossils were found in the Artois region of northern France, in rocks that were originally thought to be of Pragian age (around 410 million years ago) but more recently have been considered to be probably of Emsian origin (around 410 to 390 million years ago). Plants consisted of smooth leafless stems (axes) up to 1.5 mm wide and were at least 85 mm high. They branched at right angles. Spore-forming organs or sporangia were borne on all sides, spaced irregularly on stalks up to 3 mm long which held them horizontally, and not forming a distinct 'spike'. Individual sporangia were elliptical in shape, around 3 mm wide by 2 mm high, splitting into two 'valves' along a line opposite to the stalks in order to release their spores. Since the sporangia were at right angles to the stem, the split was vertical.

== Taxonomy ==
Specimens were first attributed to Zosterophyllum cf. myretonianum by Corsin in 1933. In 1956 Danzé-Corsin constructed a new species, Z. artesianum to accommodate this plant, arguing that it resembled Z. llanoveranum but had its sporangia arranged in a much laxer spike. Edwards notes that since then, reviews of the genus Zosterophyllum have clarified its circumscription. All species of Zosterophyllum have a compact spike of sporangia, arranged helically with some degree of regularity. The sporangia are bivalved as in this plant, but they have short stalks which turn upwards, so that the sporangia are vertically aligned and hence split (dehisce) along a horizontal line. No other genera within the zosterophylls has the features of the French specimens, so that Edwards assigned them to a new genus, Danziella, named after Danzé-Corsin.

== Phylogeny ==
Edwards considers the placement of Danziella to be uncertain. It has a simpler organization than most of the genera assigned to the zosterophylls, somewhat resembling taxa such as Cooksonia caledonica and Renalia. Renalia is placed outside the zosterophylls as one of a set of sister taxa in the cladogram for the polysporangiophytes which Crane et al. published in 2004. Edwards agrees that Danziella may be part of the stem group of the zosterophylls and hence the lycophyte clade, but says that it could also belong elsewhere and show convergent evolution of the mechanism by which the sporangia split to release spores. Hao and Xue in 2013 listed the genus as a zosterophyll.
