= Hsua =

Hsua Temporal range: Early Devonian

Scientific classification
- Kingdom: Plantae
- Clade: Embryophytes
- Clade: Polysporangiophytes
- Clade: Tracheophytes
- Family: †Hsuaceae
- Genus: †Hsua; Li 1982

Type species
- Hsua deflexa Li (1982)

Species
- H. robusta Wang, Hao & Wang (2003); H. deflexa (Li & Cai (1978)) Li (1982)

Extinct genus of vascular plants

Hsua is a genus of extinct vascular plants, known from the Devonian. The name of the genus honours the Chinese palaeobotanist, Jen Hsü (徐仁).

== Features ==
The main stems (axes) of Hsua robusta are about an inch thick, with circinate, pseudo-monopodial side branches emerging from the sides. The small side branches emerge immediately above a dichotomous branching point of the main axis. The lateral branches are in a plane (planar). In the centre of the axes is a protostele with an elliptical cross-section. The protoxylem was probably inside the xylem, maturing from the inside out. The tracheids have annular secondary wall thickening.

Round- to kidney-shaped sporangia lie on dichotomous branches at the end of the lateral branches, and open with symmetrical valves.

The trilete spores are 18 to 36 μm in size.

The gametophyte is unknown.

In Hsua deflexa, the main axis was creeping with the lateral axes at right angles from it. The axes had thorny spikes.

== Preservation ==
Hsua robusta is very well preserved in cherts and as compression fossils in the Xujiachong Formation, Yunnan, China. Hsua deflexa comes from the same formation, which is Early Devonian (~Pragian to Emsian, around 410 to 390 million years ago).

== Taxonomy ==
The terminal sporangia of Hsua robusta placed it in the traditional family Cooksoniaceae (order Rhyniales). Kenrick and Crane, based on a cladistic analysis, placed it in its own family, Hsuaceae, in the order Sawdoniales, based on spore characteristics. Hao and Xue in 2013 regarded Hsua as a "renalioid", part of the Rhyniopsida.
