= Gaspe Bay Sandstone Group =

- Stratigraphic range: Devonian
- Type: Group

Location
- Region: Quebec
- Country: Canada

The Gaspe Bay Sandstone Group is a geologic group in Quebec. It preserves fossils dating back to the Devonian period.

== See also ==
- List of fossiliferous stratigraphic units in Quebec
