= Lichen =

Symbiosis of fungi with algae

Common lichen growth forms

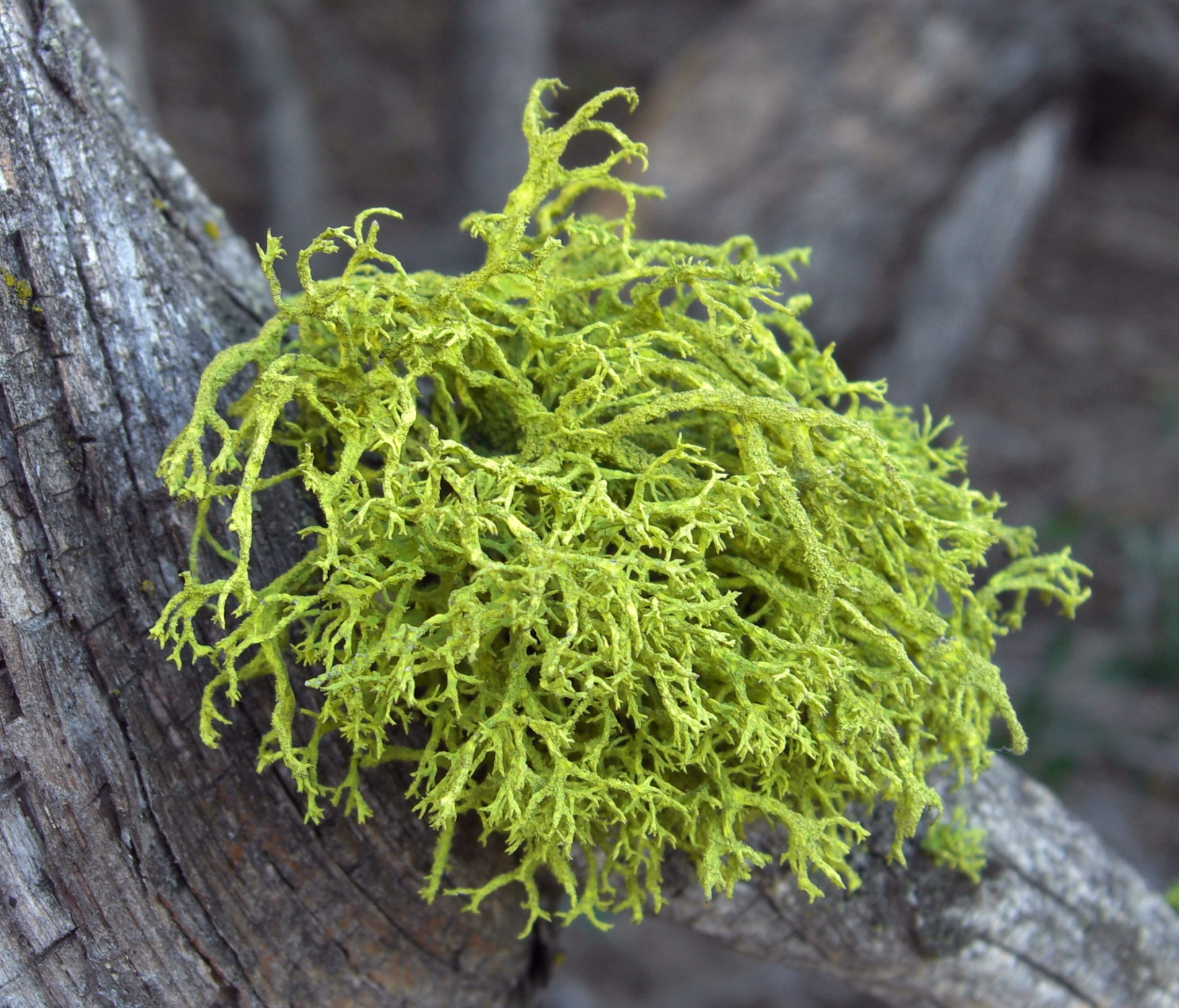
Letharia vulpina, wolf lichen, grows like a multiple-branched tuft or leafless mini-shrub, so it has a fruticose growth form.

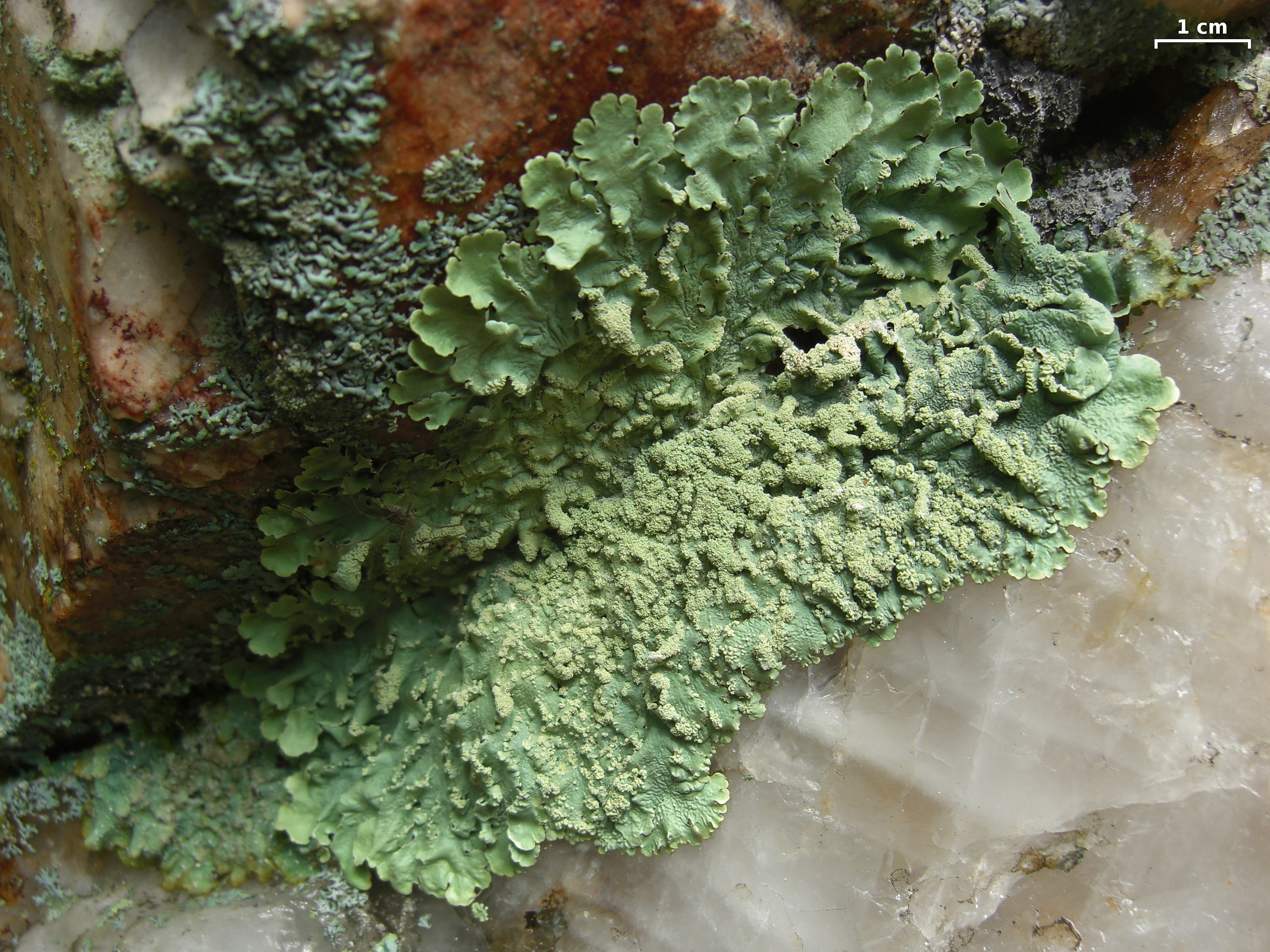
Flavoparmelia caperata has leaf-like structures, so it is foliose.

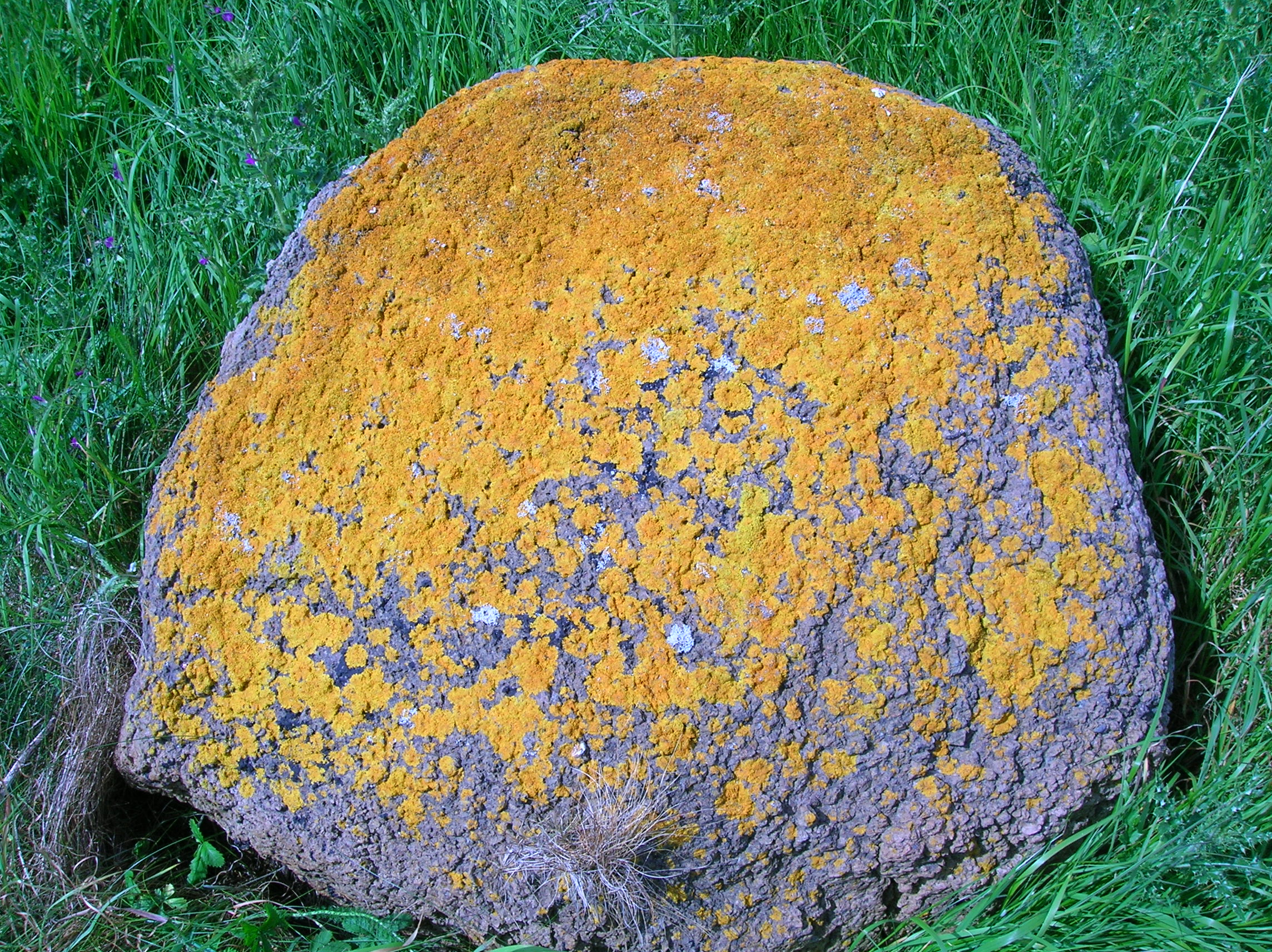
Caloplaca marina grows like an orange crust coating the rock, so it is crustose.

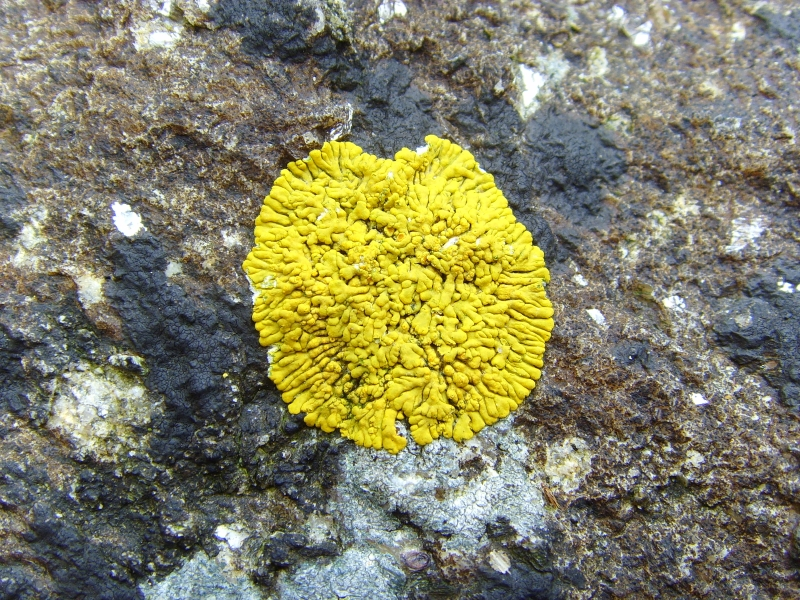
Variospora thallincola grows like a crust, and in a pattern that radiates outward from the center, so it has a crustose placodioid growth form.

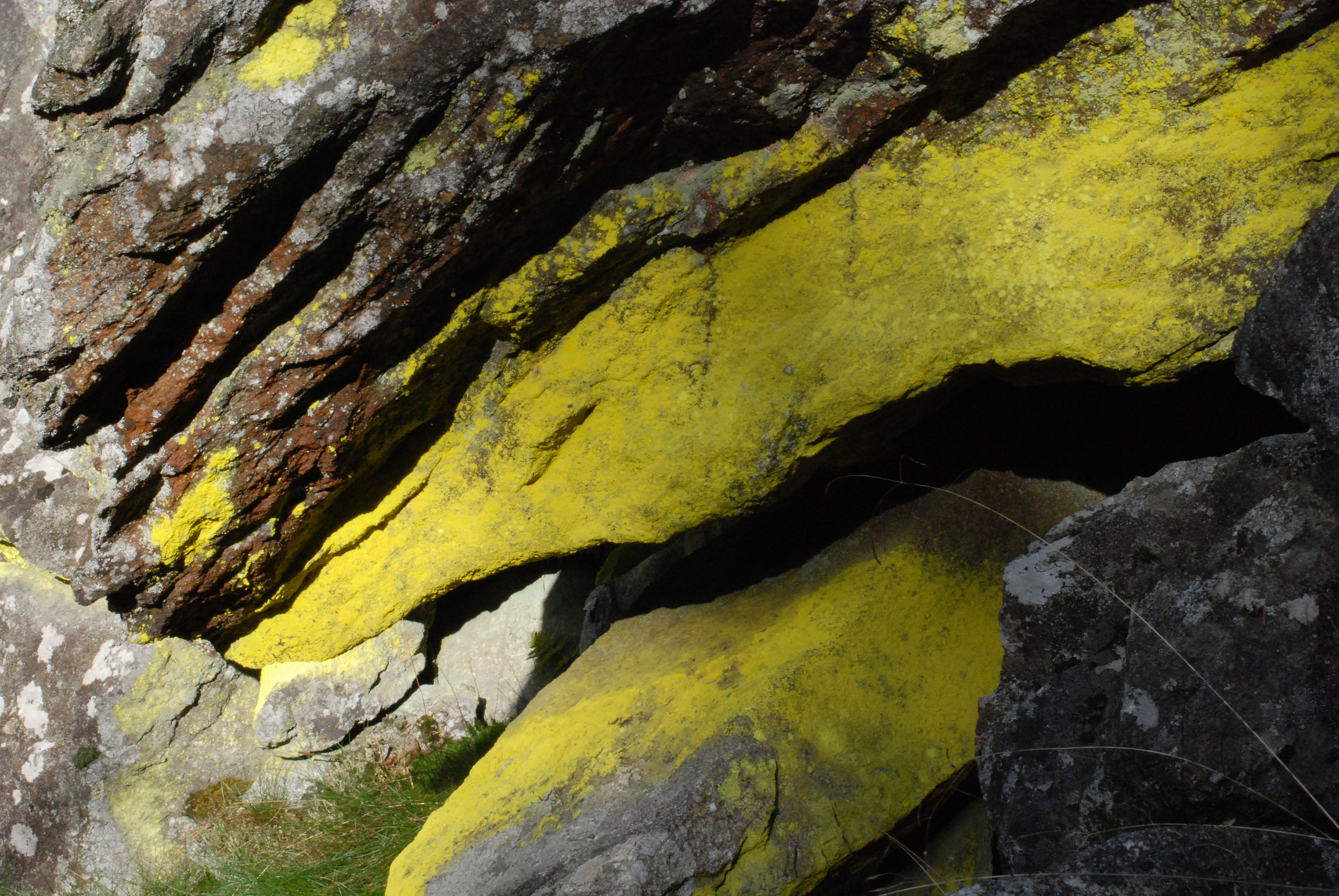
Chrysothrix chlorina grows like powder dusted on the rock, so it is leprose.

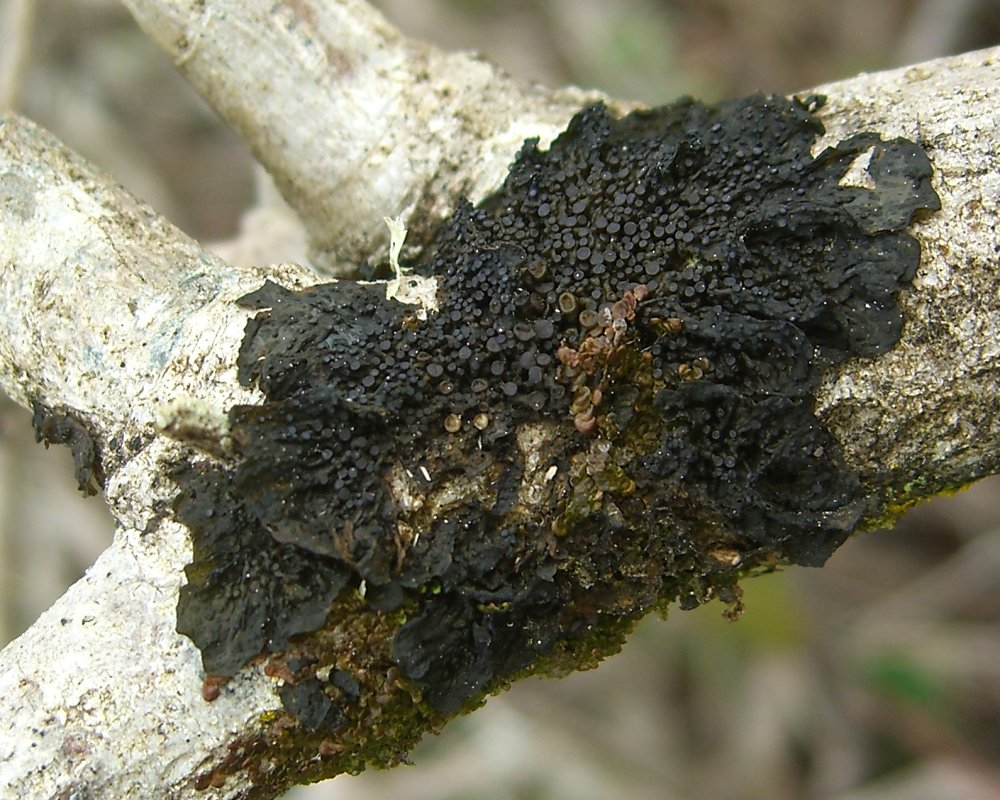
Collema nigrescens is gelatinous, without internal structure for its parts.

A tree covered with leafy foliose lichens and shrubby fruticose lichens

A lichen (/ˈlaɪkən/ LY-kən, UK also /ˈlɪtʃən/ LITCH-ən) is a hybrid colony of algae or cyanobacteria living symbiotically among filaments of multiple fungus species, along with bacteria embedded in the cortex, or "skin", in a mutualistic relationship. Lichens are the lifeform that first brought the term symbiosis (as Symbiotismus) into biological context.

Lichens have since been recognized as important actors in nutrient cycling and producers which many higher trophic feeders feed on, such as reindeer, gastropods, nematodes, mites, and springtails. Lichens have properties different from those of their component organisms. They come in many colors, sizes, and forms and are sometimes plant-like, but are not plants. They may have tiny, leafless branches (fruticose) or flat, leaf-like structures (foliose); they may grow crust-like, adhering tightly to a surface (substrate) like a thick coat of paint (crustose), have a powder-like appearance (leprose), or feature other growth forms.

A macrolichen is a lichen that is either bush-like or leafy; all other lichens are termed microlichens. Here, "macro" and "micro" do not refer to size, but to the growth form. Common names for lichens may contain the word moss (e.g., "reindeer moss", "Iceland moss"), and lichens may superficially look like and grow with mosses, but they are not closely related to mosses or any plant. Lichens do not have roots that absorb water and nutrients as plants do, but like plants, they produce their own energy by photosynthesis. When they grow on plants, they do not live as parasites, but instead use the plant's surface as a substrate.

Lichens occur from sea level to high alpine elevations, in many environmental conditions, and can grow on almost any surface. They are abundant growing on bark, leaves, mosses, or other lichens and hanging from branches "living on thin air" (epiphytes) in rainforests and in temperate woodland. They grow on rock, walls, gravestones, roofs, exposed soil surfaces, rubber, bones, and in the soil as part of biological soil crusts. Various lichens have adapted to survive in some of the most extreme environments on Earth: arctic tundra, hot dry deserts, rocky coasts, and toxic slag heaps. They can even live inside solid rock, growing between the grains (endolithic).

There are about 20,000 known species. Some lichens have lost the ability to reproduce sexually yet continue to speciate. They can be seen as being relatively self-contained miniature ecosystems, where the fungi, algae, or cyanobacteria have the potential to engage with other microorganisms in a functioning system that may evolve as an even more complex composite organism. Lichens may be long-lived, with some considered to be among the oldest living things. They are among the first living things to grow on fresh rock exposed after an event such as a landslide. The long life-span and slow and regular growth rate of some species can be used to date events (lichenometry). Lichens are a keystone species in many ecosystems and benefit trees and birds.

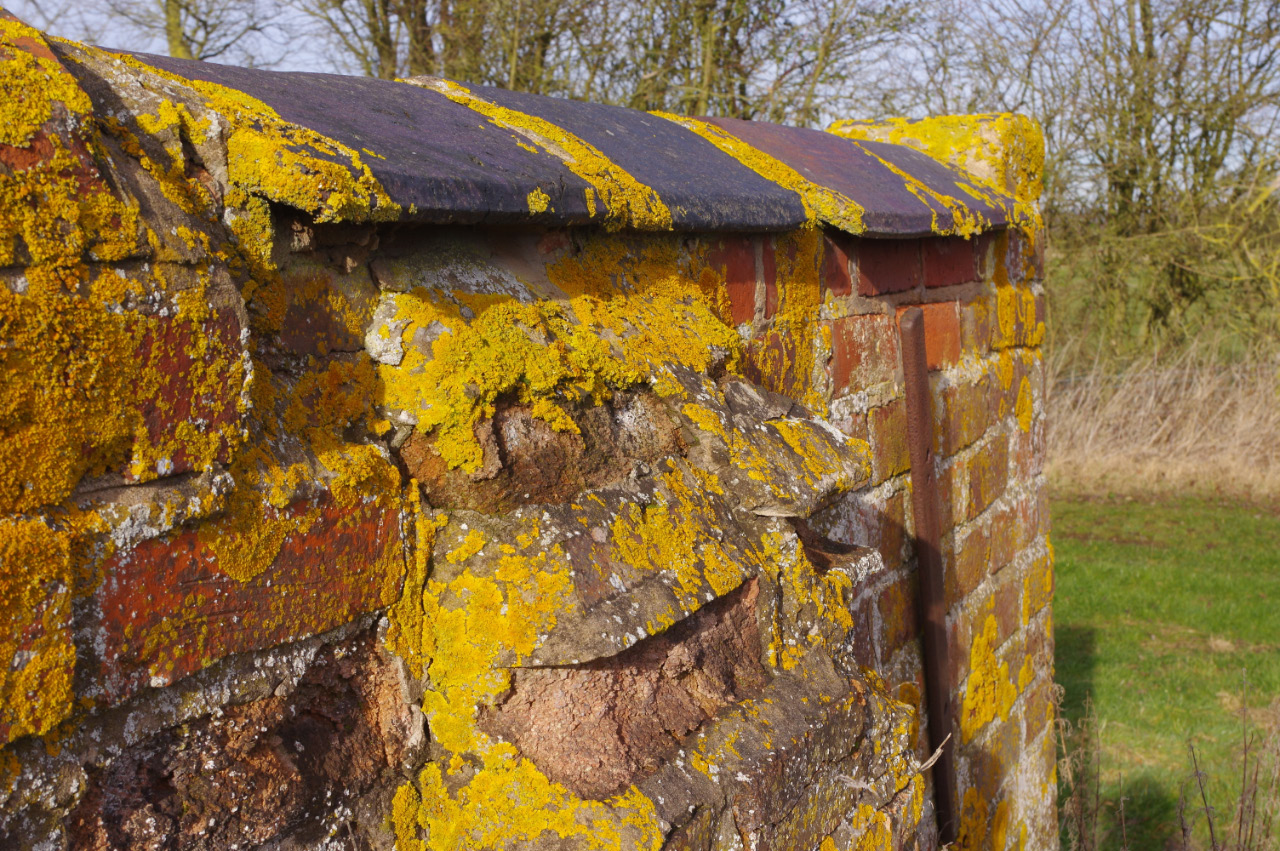
Lichen covering a brick wall

== Etymology and pronunciation ==
The English word lichen derives from the Greek λειχήν leichēn ('tree moss, lichen, lichen-like eruption on skin') via Latin lichen. The Greek noun, which literally means 'licker', derives from the verb λείχειν leichein, 'to lick'. In American English, "lichen" is pronounced the same as the verb "liken" (/ˈlaɪkən/). In British English, both this pronunciation and a less common one rhyming with "kitchen" (/ˈlɪtʃən/) are used.

== Anatomy and morphology ==
=== Growth forms ===
Lichens grow in a wide range of shapes and forms; this external appearance is known as their morphology. The shape of a lichen is usually determined by the organization of the fungal filaments. The nonreproductive tissues, or vegetative body parts, are called the thallus. Lichens are grouped by thallus type, since the thallus is usually the most visually prominent part of the lichen. Thallus growth forms typically correspond to a few basic internal structure types. Common names for lichens often come from a growth form or color that is typical of a lichen genus.

Common groupings of lichen thallus growth forms are:

1. fruticose – growing like a tuft or multiple-branched leafless mini-shrub, upright or hanging down, 3-dimensional branches with nearly round cross section (terete) or flattened
2. foliose – growing in 2-dimensional, flat, leaf-like lobes
3. crustose – crust-like, adhering tightly to a surface (substrate) like a thick coat of paint
4. squamulose – formed of small leaf-like scales crustose below but free at the tips
5. leprose – powdery
6. gelatinous – jelly-like
7. filamentous – stringy or like matted hair
8. byssoid – wispy, like teased wool
9. structureless

There are variations in growth types in a single lichen species, grey areas between the growth type descriptions, and overlapping between growth types, so some authors might describe lichens using different growth type descriptions.

When a crustose lichen gets old, the center may start to crack up like old-dried paint, old-broken asphalt paving, or like the polygonal "islands" of cracked-up mud in a dried lakebed. This is called being rimose or areolate, and the "island" pieces separated by the cracks are called areolas. The areolas appear separated, but are (or were) connected by an underlying prothallus or hypothallus. When a crustose lichen grows from a center and appears to radiate out, it is called crustose placodioid. When the edges of the areolas lift up from the substrate, it is called squamulose.

These growth form groups are not precisely defined. Foliose lichens may sometimes branch and appear to be fruticose. Fruticose lichens may have flattened branching parts and appear leafy. Squamulose lichens may appear where the edges lift up. Gelatinous lichens may appear leafy when dry.

The thallus is not always the part of the lichen that is most visually noticeable. Some lichens can grow inside solid rock between the grains (endolithic lichens), with only the sexual fruiting part visible growing outside the rock. These may be dramatic in color or appearance. Forms of these sexual parts are not in the above growth form categories. The most visually noticeable reproductive parts are often circular, raised, plate-like or disc-like outgrowths, with crinkly edges, and are described in sections below.

=== Color ===
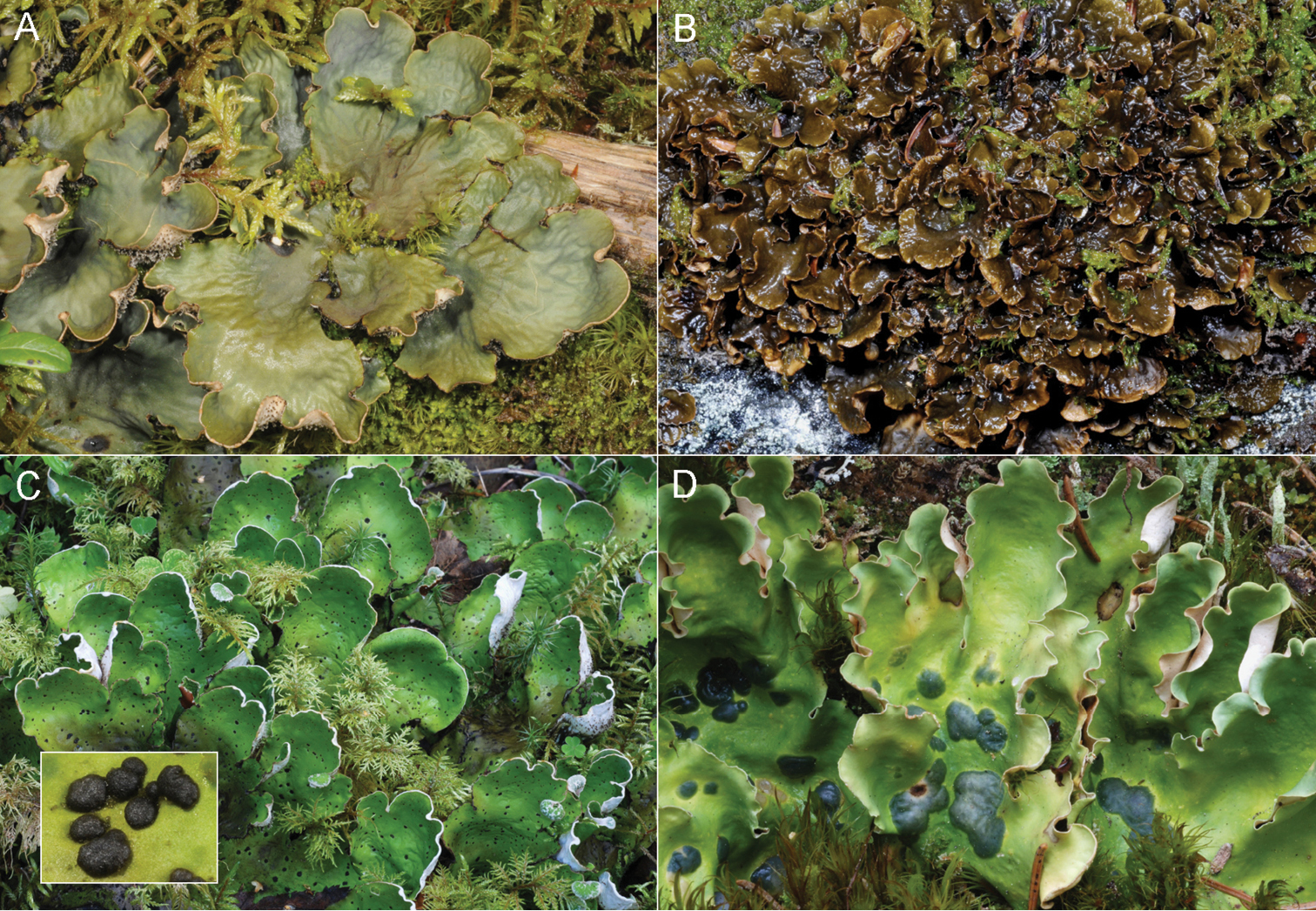
Lichens

Lichens come in many colors. Coloration is usually determined by the photosynthetic component. Special pigments, such as yellow usnic acid, give lichens a variety of colors, including reds, oranges, yellows, and browns, especially in exposed, dry habitats. In the absence of special pigments, lichens are usually bright green to olive gray when wet, gray or grayish-green to brown when dry. This is because moisture causes the surface skin (cortex) to become more transparent, exposing the green photobiont layer. Different colored lichens covering large areas of exposed rock surfaces, or lichens covering or hanging from bark can be a spectacular display when the patches of diverse colors "come to life" or "glow" in brilliant displays following rain.

Different colored lichens may inhabit different adjacent sections of a rock face, depending on the angle of exposure to light. Colonies of lichens may be spectacular in appearance, dominating much of the surface of the visual landscape in forests and natural places, such as the vertical "paint" covering the vast rock faces of Yosemite National Park.

Color is used in identification. The color of a lichen changes depending on whether the lichen is wet or dry. Color descriptions used for identification are based on the color that shows when the lichen is dry. Dry lichens with a cyanobacterium as the photosynthetic partner tend to be dark grey, brown, or black.

The underside of the leaf-like lobes of foliose lichens is a different color from the top side (dorsiventral), often brown or black, sometimes white. A fruticose lichen may have flattened "branches", appearing similar to a foliose lichen, but the underside of a leaf-like structure on a fruticose lichen is the same color as the top side. The leaf-like lobes of a foliose lichen may branch, giving the appearance of a fruticose lichen, but the underside will be a different color from the top side.

The sheen on some jelly-like gelatinous lichens is created by mucilaginous secretions.

=== Internal structure ===
Schematic cross section of foliose lichen: (a) The cortex is the outer layer of tightly woven fungus filaments (hyphae) (b) This photobiont layer has photosynthesizing green algae (c) Loosely packed hyphae in the medulla (d) A tightly woven lower cortex (e) Anchoring hyphae called rhizines where the fungus attaches to the substrate

A lichen consists of a simple photosynthesizing organism, usually a green alga or cyanobacterium, surrounded by filaments of a fungus. Generally, most of a lichen's bulk is made of interwoven fungal filaments, but this is reversed in filamentous and gelatinous lichens. The fungus is called a mycobiont. The photosynthesizing organism is called a photobiont. Algal photobionts are called phycobionts. Cyanobacteria photobionts are called cyanobionts.

The part of a lichen that is not involved in reproduction, the "body" or "vegetative tissue" of a lichen, is called the thallus. The thallus form is very different from any form where the fungus or alga are growing separately. The thallus is made up of filaments of the fungus called hyphae. The filaments grow by branching then rejoining to create a mesh, which is called being "anastomosed". The mesh of fungal filaments may be dense or loose.

Generally, the fungal mesh surrounds the algal or cyanobacterial cells, often enclosing them within complex fungal tissues that are unique to lichen associations. The thallus may or may not have a protective "skin" of densely packed fungal filaments, often containing a second fungal species, which is called a cortex. Fruticose lichens have one cortex layer wrapping around the "branches". Foliose lichens have an upper cortex on the top side of the "leaf", and a separate lower cortex on the bottom side. Crustose and squamulose lichens have only an upper cortex, with the "inside" of the lichen in direct contact with the surface they grow on (the substrate). Even if the edges peel up from the substrate and appear flat and leaf-like, they lack a lower cortex, unlike foliose lichens. Filamentous, byssoid, leprose, gelatinous, and other lichens do not have a cortex; in other words, they are ecorticate.

Fruticose, foliose, crustose, and squamulose lichens generally have up to three different types of tissue, differentiated by having different densities of fungal filaments. The top layer, where the lichen contacts the environment, is called a cortex. The cortex is made of densely tightly woven, packed, and glued together (agglutinated) fungal filaments. The dense packing makes the cortex act like a protective "skin", keeping other organisms out, and reducing the intensity of sunlight on the layers below. The cortex layer can be up to several hundred micrometers (μm) in thickness (less than a millimeter). The cortex may be further topped by an epicortex of secretions, not cells, 0.6–1 μm thick in some lichens. This secretion layer may or may not have pores.

Below the cortex layer is a layer called the photobiontic layer or symbiont layer. The symbiont layer has less densely packed fungal filaments, with the photosynthetic partner embedded in them. The less dense packing allows air circulation during photosynthesis, similar to the anatomy of a leaf. Each cell or group of cells of the photobiont is usually individually wrapped by hyphae, and in some cases penetrated by a haustorium. In crustose and foliose lichens, algae in the photobiontic layer are diffuse among the fungal filaments, decreasing in gradation into the layer below. In fruticose lichens, the photobiontic layer is sharply distinct from the layer below.

The layer beneath the symbiont layer is called the medulla. The medulla is less densely packed with fungal filaments than the layers above. In foliose lichens, as in Peltigera, there is usually another densely packed layer of fungal filaments called the lower cortex. Root-like fungal structures called rhizines (usually) grow from the lower cortex to attach or anchor the lichen to the substrate. Fruticose lichens have a single cortex wrapping all the way around the "stems" and "branches". The medulla is the lowest layer, and may form a cottony white inner core for the branchlike thallus, or it may be hollow. Crustose and squamulose lichens lack a lower cortex, and the medulla is in direct contact with the substrate that the lichen grows on.

In crustose areolate lichens, the edges of the areolas peel up from the substrate and appear leafy. In squamulose lichens the part of the lichen thallus that is not attached to the substrate may also appear leafy. But these leafy parts lack a lower cortex, which distinguishes crustose and squamulose lichens from foliose lichens. Conversely, foliose lichens may appear flattened against the substrate like a crustose lichen, but most of the leaf-like lobes can be lifted up from the substrate because it is separated from it by a tightly packed lower cortex.

Gelatinous, byssoid, and leprose lichens lack a cortex (are ecorticate), and generally have only undifferentiated tissue, similar to only having a symbiont layer.

In lichens that include both green algal and cyanobacterial symbionts, the cyanobacteria may be held on the upper or lower surface in small pustules called cephalodia.

Pruinia is a whitish coating on top of an upper surface. An epinecral layer is "a layer of horny dead fungal hyphae with indistinct lumina in or near the cortex above the algal layer".

In August 2016, it was reported that some macrolichens have more than one species of fungus in their tissues.

== Physiology ==
=== Symbiotic relation ===
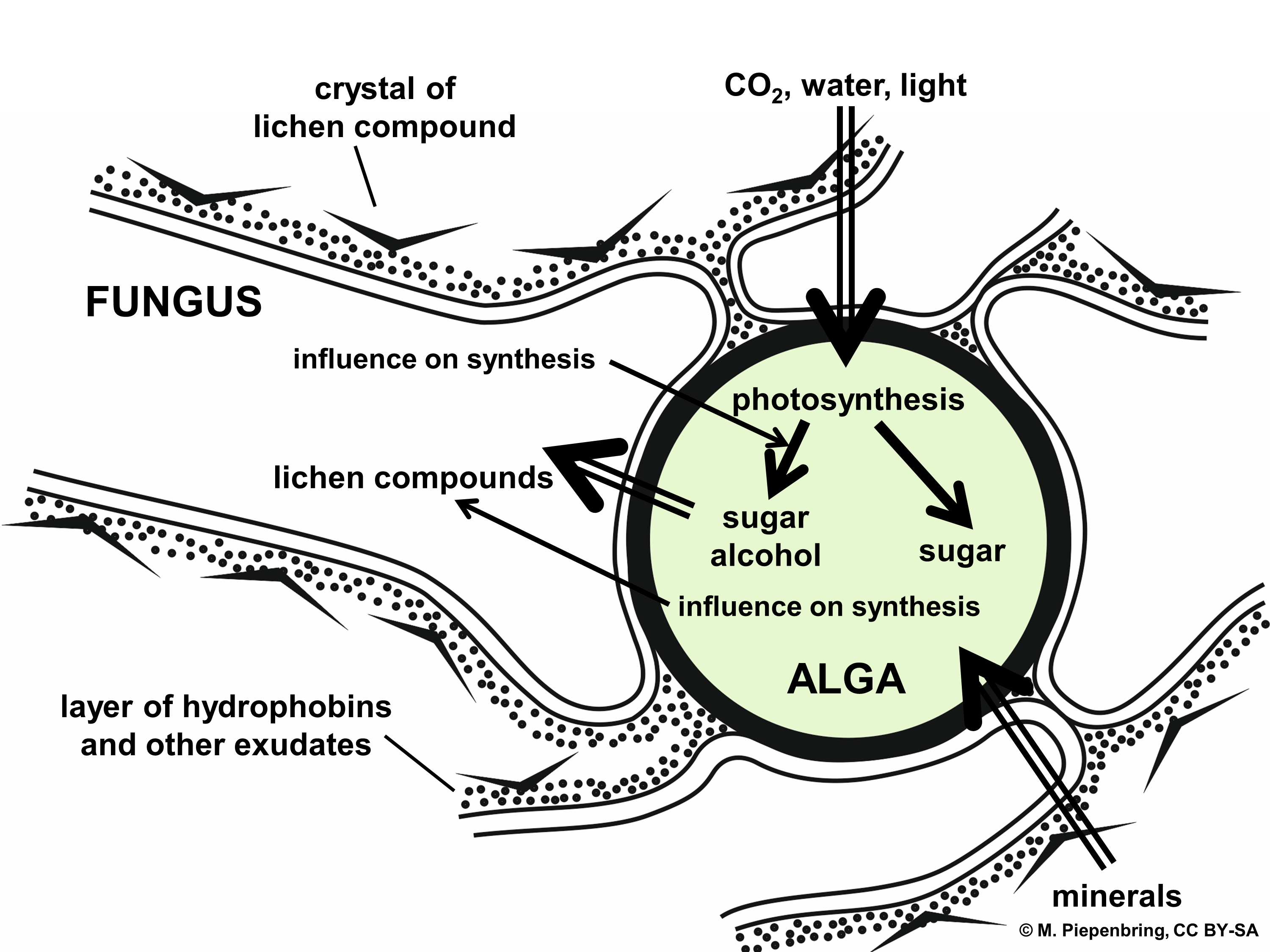
Lichens interaction

A lichen is a composite organism that emerges from algae or cyanobacteria living among the filaments (hyphae) of the fungi in a mutually beneficial symbiotic relationship. The fungi benefit from the carbohydrates produced by the algae or cyanobacteria via photosynthesis. The algae or cyanobacteria benefit by being protected from the environment by the filaments of the fungi, which also gather moisture and nutrients from the environment, and (usually) provide an anchor to it. Although some photosynthetic partners in a lichen can survive outside the lichen, the lichen symbiotic association extends the ecological range of both partners, whereby most descriptions of lichen associations describe them as symbiotic. Both partners gain water and mineral nutrients mainly from the atmosphere, through rain and dust. The fungal partner protects the alga by retaining water, serving as a larger capture area for mineral nutrients and, in some cases, provides minerals obtained from the substrate. If a cyanobacterium is present, as a primary partner or another symbiont in addition to a green alga as in certain tripartite lichens, it can fix atmospheric nitrogen, complementing the activities of the green alga.

In three different lineages the fungal partner has independently lost the mitochondrial gene atp9, which has key functions in mitochondrial energy production. The loss makes the fungi completely dependent on their symbionts.

The algal or cyanobacterial cells are photosynthetic and, as in plants, they reduce atmospheric carbon dioxide into organic carbon sugars to feed both symbionts. Phycobionts (algae) produce sugar alcohols (ribitol, sorbitol, and erythritol), which are absorbed by the mycobiont (fungus). Cyanobionts produce glucose. Lichenized fungal cells can make the photobiont "leak" out the products of photosynthesis, where they can then be absorbed by the fungus.

It appears many, probably the majority, of lichens also live in a symbiotic relationship with an order of basidiomycete yeasts called Cyphobasidiales. The absence of this third partner could explain why growing lichen in the laboratory is difficult. The yeast cells are responsible for the formation of the characteristic cortex of the lichen thallus, and could also be important for its shape. An example of this lichen-yeast symbiosis is the North American beard-like lichens.

The lichen combination of alga or cyanobacterium with a fungus has a very different form (morphology), physiology, and biochemistry than the component fungus, alga, or cyanobacterium growing by itself, naturally or in culture. The body (thallus) of most lichens is different from those of either the fungus or alga growing separately. When grown in the laboratory in the absence of its photobiont, a lichen fungus develops as a structureless, undifferentiated mass of fungal filaments (hyphae). If combined with its photobiont under appropriate conditions, its characteristic form associated with the photobiont emerges, in the process called morphogenesis. In a few remarkable cases, a single lichen fungus can develop into two very different lichen forms when associating with either a green algal or a cyanobacterial symbiont. Quite naturally, these alternative forms were at first considered to be different species, until they were found growing in a conjoined manner.

Evidence that lichens are examples of successful symbiosis is the fact that lichens can be found in almost every habitat and geographic area on the planet. Two species in two genera of green algae are found in over 35% of all lichens, but can only rarely be found living on their own outside of a lichen.

In a case where one fungal partner simultaneously had two green algae partners that outperform each other in different climates, this might indicate that having more than one photosynthetic partner at the same time might enable the lichen to exist in a wider range of habitats and geographic locations.

Phycobionts can have a net output of sugars with only water vapour. The thallus must be saturated with liquid water for cyanobionts to photosynthesise.

Algae produce sugars that are absorbed by the fungus by diffusion into special fungal hyphae called appressoria or haustoria in contact with the wall of the algal cells. The appressoria or haustoria may produce a substance that increases permeability of the algal cell walls, and may penetrate the walls. The algae may contribute up to 80% of their sugar production to the fungus.

=== Ecology ===
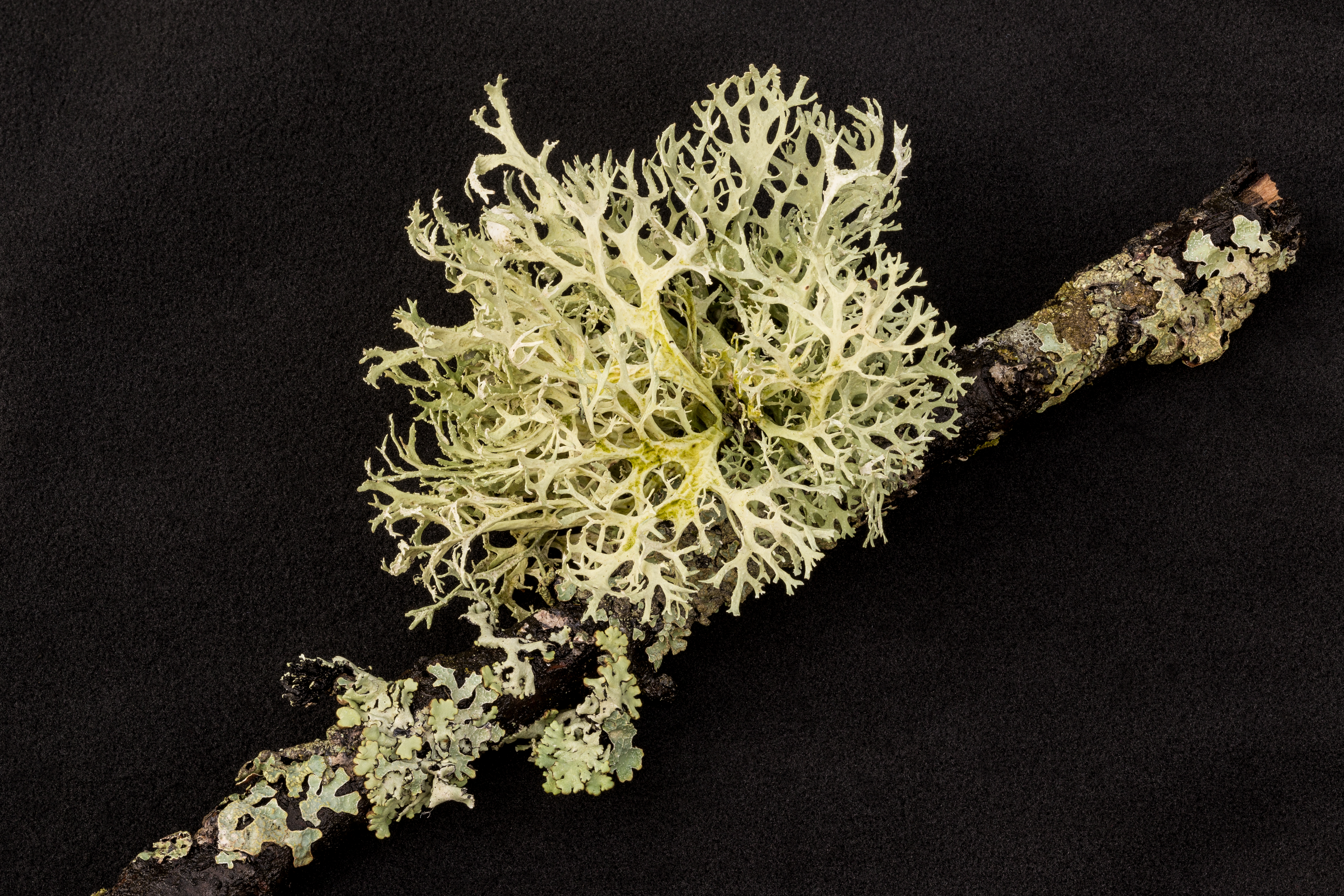
Lichens considered to be example of mutualistic symbiosis

Lichen associations may be examples of mutualism or commensalism, but the lichen relationship can be considered parasitic under circumstances where the photosynthetic partner can exist in nature independently of the fungal partner, but not vice versa. Photobiont cells are routinely destroyed in the course of nutrient exchange. The association continues because reproduction of the photobiont cells matches the rate at which they are destroyed. The fungus surrounds the algal cells, often enclosing them within complex fungal tissues unique to lichen associations. In many species the fungus penetrates the algal cell wall, forming penetration pegs (haustoria) similar to those produced by pathogenic fungi that feed on a host. Cyanobacteria in laboratory settings can grow faster when they are alone rather than when they are part of a lichen.

==== Miniature ecosystem and holobiont theory ====
Symbiosis in lichens is so well-balanced that lichens have been considered to be relatively self-contained miniature ecosystems in and of themselves. It is thought that lichens may be even more complex symbiotic systems that include non-photosynthetic bacterial communities performing other functions as partners in a holobiont.

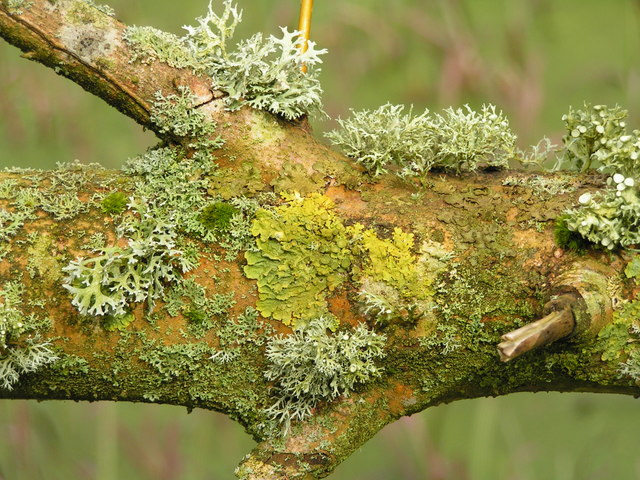
Lichens on a branch

Many lichens are very sensitive to environmental disturbances and can be used to cheaply assess air pollution, ozone depletion, and metal contamination. Lichens have been used in making dyes, perfumes (oakmoss), and in traditional medicines. A few lichen species are eaten by insects or larger animals, such as reindeer. Lichens are widely used as environmental indicators or bio-indicators. When air is very badly polluted with sulphur dioxide, there may be no lichens present; only some green algae can tolerate those conditions. If the air is clean, then shrubby, hairy and leafy lichens become abundant. A few lichen species can tolerate fairly high levels of pollution, and are commonly found in urban areas, on pavements, walls and tree bark. The most sensitive lichens are shrubby and leafy, while the most tolerant lichens are all crusty in appearance. Since industrialisation, many of the shrubby and leafy lichens such as Ramalina, Usnea and Lobaria species have very limited ranges, often being confined to the areas which have the cleanest air.

==== Lichenicolous fungi ====
Some fungi can only be found living on lichens as obligate parasites. These are referred to as lichenicolous fungi, and are a different species from the fungus living inside the lichen; thus they are not considered to be part of the lichen.

=== Reaction to water ===
Moisture makes the cortex become more transparent. This way, the algae can conduct photosynthesis when moisture is available, and is protected at other times. When the cortex is more transparent, the algae show more clearly and the lichen looks greener.

=== Metabolites, metabolite structures and bioactivity ===
Lichens can show intense antioxidant activity. Secondary metabolites are often deposited as crystals in the apoplast. Secondary metabolites are thought to play a role in preference for some substrates over others.

=== Growth rate ===
Lichens often have a regular but very slow growth rate of less than a millimeter per year.

In crustose lichens, the area along the margin is where the most active growth is taking place. Most crustose lichens grow only 1–2 mm in diameter per year.

=== Life span ===
Lichens may be long-lived, with some considered to be among the oldest living organisms. Lifespan is difficult to measure because what defines the "same" individual lichen is not precise. Lichens grow by vegetatively breaking off a piece, which may or may not be defined as the "same" lichen, and two lichens can merge, then becoming the "same" lichen. One specimen of Rhizocarpon geographicum on East Baffin Island has an estimated age of 9500 years. Thalli of Rhizocarpon geographicum and Rhizocarpon eupetraeoides/inarense in the central Brooks Range of northern Alaska have been given a maximum possible age of 10,000–11,500 years.

=== Response to environmental stress ===
Unlike simple dehydration in plants and animals, lichens may experience a complete loss of body water in dry periods. Lichens are capable of surviving extremely low levels of water content (poikilohydric). They quickly absorb water when it becomes available again, becoming soft and fleshy.

In tests, lichen survived and showed remarkable results on the adaptation capacity of photosynthetic activity within the simulation time of 34 days under Martian conditions in the Mars Simulation Laboratory (MSL) maintained by the German Aerospace Center (DLR).

The European Space Agency has discovered that lichens can survive unprotected in space. In an experiment led by Leopoldo Sancho from the Complutense University of Madrid, two species of lichen—Rhizocarpon geographicum and Rusavskia elegans—were sealed in a capsule and launched on a Russian Soyuz rocket 31 May 2005. Once in orbit, the capsules were opened and the lichens were directly exposed to the vacuum of space with its widely fluctuating temperatures and cosmic radiation. After 15 days, the lichens were brought back to earth and were found to be unchanged in their ability to photosynthesize.

== Reproduction and dispersal ==
=== Vegetative reproduction ===
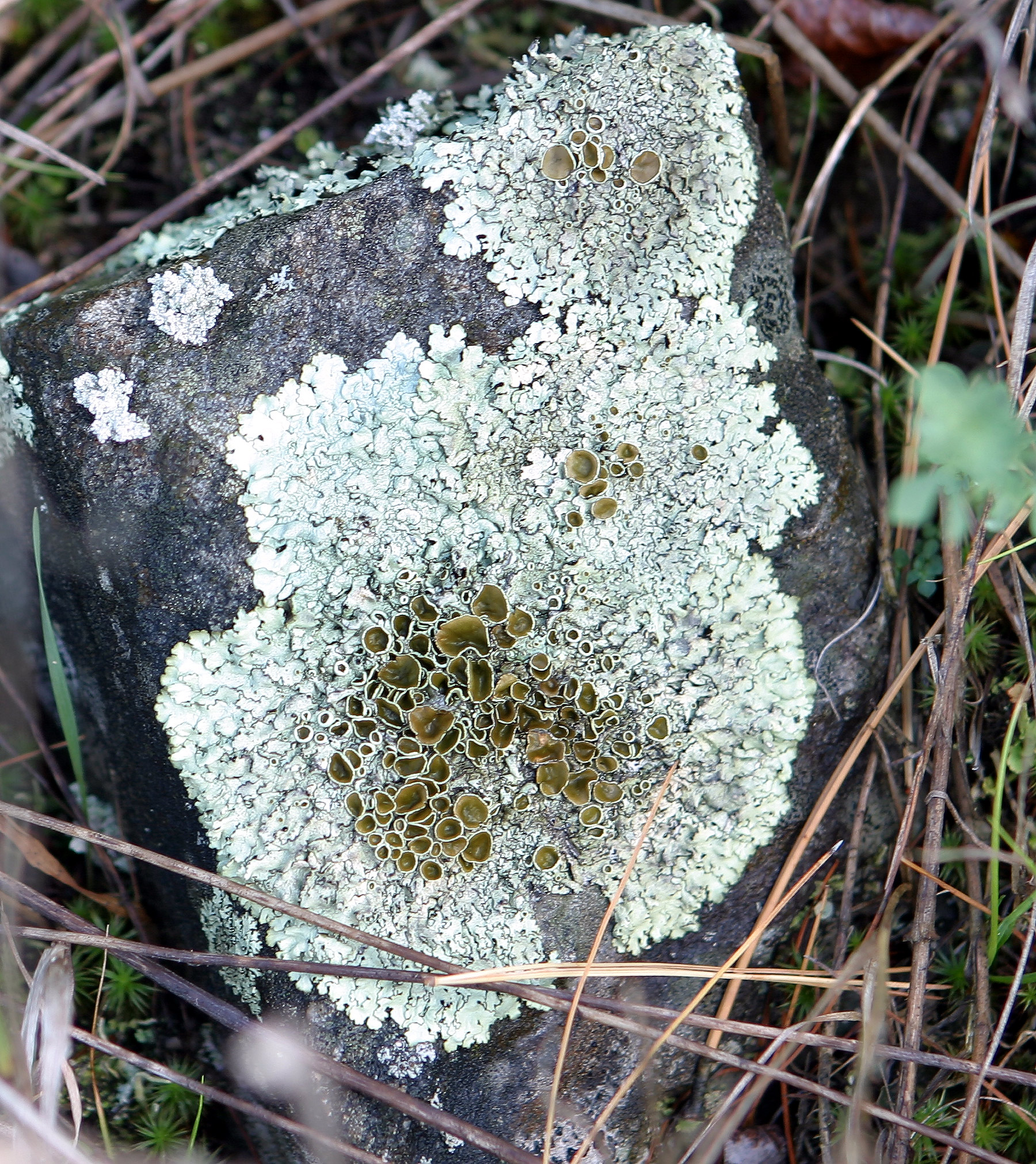
Xanthoparmelia sp. with dark-colored reproductive structures (disc-like apothecia) at center, surrounded by a pale coloured vegetative thallus.

Many lichens reproduce asexually, either by a piece breaking off and growing on its own (vegetative reproduction) or through the dispersal of diaspores containing a few algal cells surrounded by fungal cells. Because of the relative lack of differentiation in the thallus, the line between diaspore formation and vegetative reproduction is often blurred. Fruticose lichens can fragment, and new lichens can grow from the fragment (vegetative reproduction). Many lichens break up into fragments when they dry, dispersing themselves by wind action, to resume growth when moisture returns. Soredia (singular: "soredium") are small groups of algal cells surrounded by fungal filaments that form in structures called soralia, from which the soredia can be dispersed by wind. Isidia (singular: "isidium") are branched, spiny, elongated, outgrowths from the thallus that break off for mechanical dispersal. Lichen propagules (diaspores) typically contain cells from both partners, although the fungal components of so-called "fringe species" rely instead on algal cells dispersed by the "core species".

=== Sexual reproduction ===
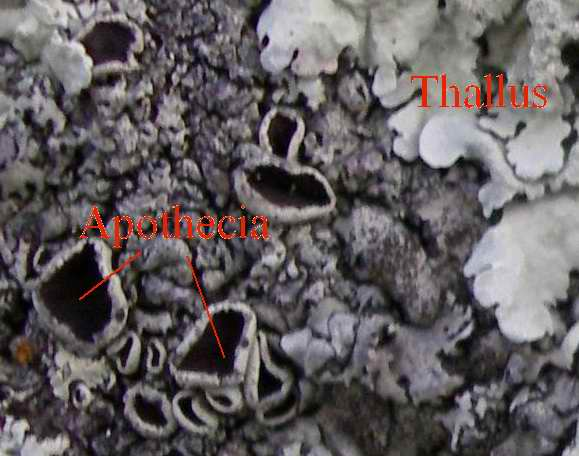
Disc-like apothecia (left) and thallus (right) on a foliose lichen

Structures involved in reproduction often appear as discs, bumps, or squiggly lines on the surface of the thallus. Though it has been argued that sexual reproduction in photobionts is selected against, there is strong evidence for meiotic activities (sexual reproduction) in Trebouxia. Many lichen fungi reproduce sexually like other fungi, producing spores formed by meiosis and fusion of gametes. Following dispersal, such fungal spores must meet with a compatible algal partner before a functional lichen can form.

Some lichen fungi belong to the phylum Basidiomycota (basidiolichens) and produce mushroom-like reproductive structures resembling those of their nonlichenized relatives.

Most lichen fungi belong to Ascomycetes (ascolichens). Among the ascolichens, spores are produced in spore-producing structures called ascomata. The most common types of ascomata are the apothecium (plural: apothecia) and perithecium (plural: perithecia). Apothecia are usually cups or plate-like discs located on the top surface of the lichen thallus. When apothecia are shaped like squiggly line segments instead of like discs, they are called lirellae. Perithecia are shaped like flasks that are immersed in the lichen thallus tissue, which has a small hole for the spores to escape the flask, and appear like black dots on the lichen surface.

The three most common spore body types are raised discs called apothecia (singular: apothecium), bottle-like cups with a small hole at the top called perithecia (singular: perithecium), and pycnidia (singular: pycnidium), shaped like perithecia but without asci (an ascus is the structure that contains and releases the sexual spores in fungi of the Ascomycota).

The apothecium has a layer of exposed spore-producing cells called asci (singular: ascus), and is usually a different color from the thallus tissue. When the apothecium has an outer margin, the margin is called the exciple. When the exciple has a color similar to colored thallus tissue the apothecium or lichen is called lecanorine, meaning similar to members of the genus Lecanora. When the exciple is blackened like carbon it is called lecideine meaning similar to members of the genus Lecidea. When the margin is pale or colorless it is called biatorine.

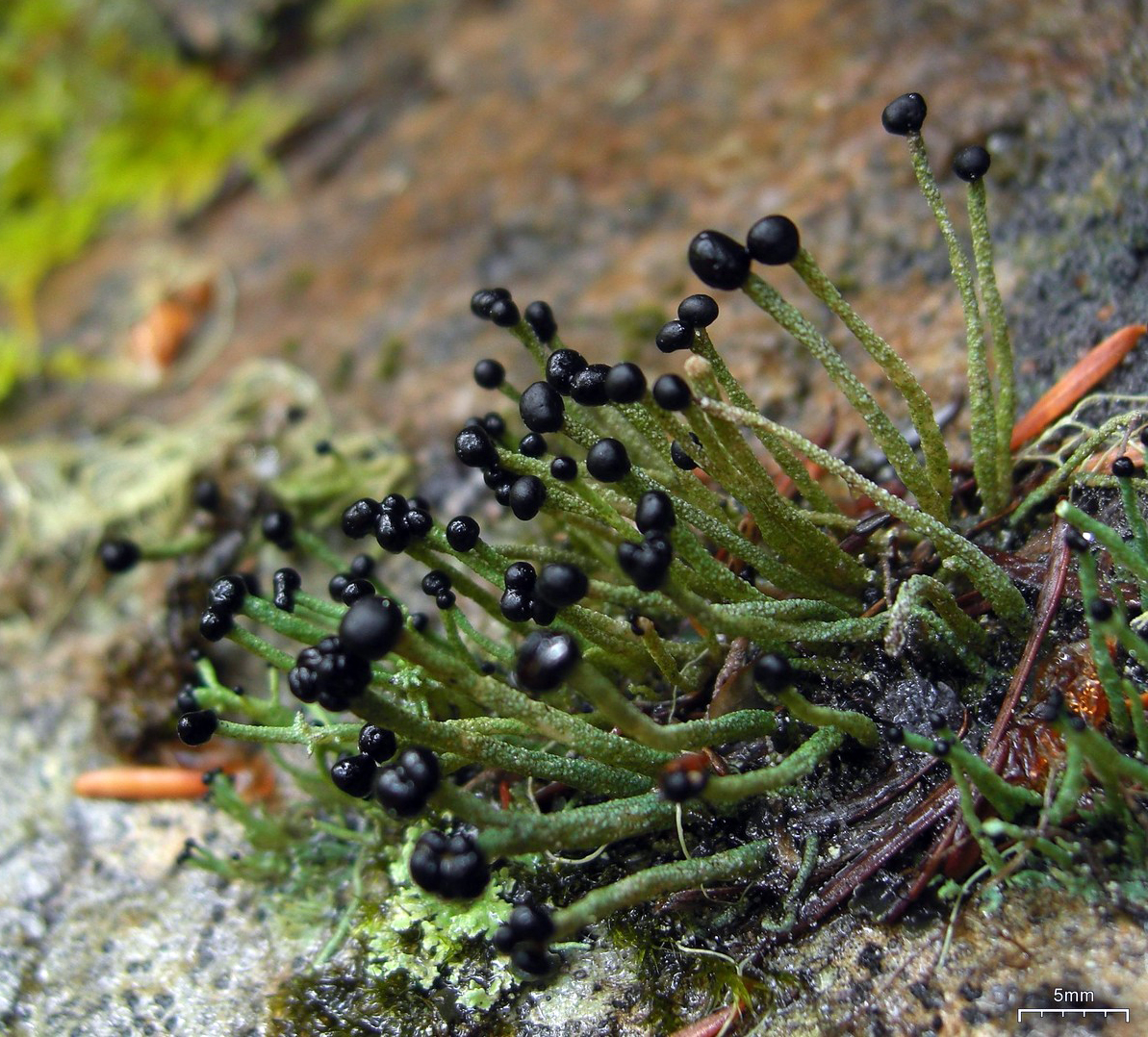
Crust-like thallus with pseudopodetia

A "podetium" (plural: podetia) is a lichenized stalk-like structure of the fruiting body rising from the thallus, associated with some fungi that produce a fungal apothecium. Since it is part of the reproductive tissue, podetia are not considered part of the main body (thallus), but may be visually prominent. The podetium may be branched, and sometimes cup-like. They usually bear the fungal pycnidia or apothecia or both. Many lichens have apothecia that are visible to the naked eye.

Most lichens produce abundant sexual structures. Many species appear to disperse only by sexual spores. For example, the crustose lichens Graphis scripta and Ochrolechia parella produce no symbiotic vegetative propagules. Instead, the lichen-forming fungi of these species reproduce sexually by self-fertilization (i.e. they are homothallic). This breeding system may enable successful reproduction in harsh environments.

Mazaedia (singular: mazaedium) are apothecia shaped like a dressmaker's pin in pin lichens, where the fruiting body is a brown or black mass of loose ascospores enclosed by a cup-shaped exciple, which sits on top of a tiny stalk.

== Taxonomy and classification ==
Lichens are classified by the fungal component. Lichen species are given the same scientific name (binomial name) as the fungus species in the lichen. Lichens are being integrated into the classification schemes for fungi. The alga bears its own scientific name, which bears no relationship to that of the lichen or fungus. There are about 20,000 identified lichen species, and taxonomists have estimated that the total number of lichen species (including those yet undiscovered) might be as high as 28,000. Nearly 20% of known fungal species are associated with lichens.

"Lichenized fungus" may refer to the entire lichen, or to just the fungus. This may cause confusion without context. A particular fungus species may form lichens with different algae species, giving rise to what appear to be different lichen species, but which are still classified (as of 2014) as the same lichen species.

Formerly, some lichen taxonomists placed lichens in their own division, the Mycophycophyta, but this practice is no longer accepted because the components belong to separate lineages. Neither the ascolichens nor the basidiolichens form monophyletic lineages in their respective fungal phyla, but they do form several major solely or primarily lichen-forming groups within each phylum. Even more unusual than basidiolichens is the fungus Geosiphon pyriforme, a member of the Glomeromycota that is unique in that it encloses a cyanobacterial symbiont inside its cells. Geosiphon is not usually considered to be a lichen, and its peculiar symbiosis was not recognized for many years. The genus is more closely allied to endomycorrhizal genera. Fungi from Verrucariales also form marine lichens with the brown algae Petroderma maculiforme, and have a symbiotic relationship with seaweed (such as rockweed) and Blidingia minima, where the algae are the dominant components. The fungi is thought to help the rockweeds to resist desiccation when exposed to air. In addition, lichens can also use yellow-green algae (Heterococcus) as their symbiotic partner.

Lichens independently emerged from fungi associating with algae and cyanobacteria multiple times throughout history.

=== Fungi ===
The fungal component of a lichen is called the mycobiont. The mycobiont may be an Ascomycete or Basidiomycete. The associated lichens are called either ascolichens or basidiolichens, respectively. Living as a symbiont in a lichen appears to be a successful way for a fungus to derive essential nutrients, since about 20% of all fungal species have acquired this mode of life.

Thalli produced by a given fungal symbiont with its differing partners may be similar, and the secondary metabolites identical, indicating that the fungus has the dominant role in determining the morphology of the lichen. But the same mycobiont with different photobionts may also produce very different growth forms. Lichens are known in which there is one fungus associated with multiple photobionts, such as a species of alga and a cyanobacteria involved in the same relationship, or multiple genotypes of the same alga.

Although each lichen thallus generally appears homogeneous, some evidence seems to suggest that the fungal component may consist of more than one genetic individual of that species.

Two or more fungal species can interact to form a lichen assemblage.

=== Photobionts ===
The photosynthetic partner in a lichen is called a photobiont. The photobionts in lichens come from a variety of simple prokaryotic and eukaryotic organisms. In the majority of lichens the photobiont is a green alga (Chlorophyta) or a cyanobacterium. In some lichens both types are present; in such cases, the alga is typically the primary partner, with the cyanobacteria being located in cryptic pockets. Algal photobionts are called phycobionts, while cyanobacterial photobionts are called cyanobionts. About 90% of all known lichens have phycobionts, and about 10% have cyanobionts. Approximately 100 species of photosynthetic partners from 40 genera and five distinct classes (prokaryotic: Cyanophyceae; eukaryotic: Trebouxiophyceae, Phaeophyceae, Chlorophyceae) have been found to associate with the lichen-forming fungi.

Common algal photobionts are from the genera Trebouxia, Trentepohlia, Pseudotrebouxia, or Myrmecia. Trebouxia is the most common genus of green algae in lichens, occurring in about 40% of all lichens. "Trebouxioid" means either a photobiont that is in the genus Trebouxia, or resembles a member of that genus, and is therefore presumably a member of the class Trebouxiophyceae. The second most commonly represented green alga genus is Trentepohlia. Overall, about 100 species of eukaryotes are known to occur as photobionts in lichens. All the algae are probably able to exist independently in nature as well as in the lichen.

A "cyanolichen" is a lichen with a cyanobacterium as its main photosynthetic component (photobiont). Most cyanolichen are also ascolichens, but a few basidiolichen like Dictyonema and Acantholichen have cyanobacteria as their partner.

The most commonly occurring cyanobacterium genus is Nostoc. Other common cyanobacterium photobionts are from Scytonema. Many cyanolichens are small and black, and have limestone as the substrate. Another cyanolichen group, the jelly lichens of the genera Collema or Leptogium are gelatinous and live on moist soils. Another group of large and foliose species including Peltigera, Lobaria, and Degelia are grey-blue, especially when dampened or wet. Many of these characterize the Lobarion communities of higher rainfall areas in western Britain, e.g., in the Celtic rain forest. Strains of cyanobacteria found in various cyanolichens are often closely related to one another. They differ from the most closely related free-living strains.

The lichen association is a close symbiosis. It extends the ecological range of both partners but is not always obligatory for their growth and reproduction in natural environments, since many of the algal symbionts can live independently. A prominent example is the alga Trentepohlia, which forms orange-coloured populations on tree trunks and suitable rock faces. Lichen propagules (diaspores) typically contain cells from both partners, although the fungal components of so-called "fringe species" rely instead on algal cells dispersed by the "core species".

The same cyanobiont species can occur in association with different fungal species as lichen partners. The same phycobiont species can occur in association with different fungal species as lichen partners. More than one phycobiont may be present in a single thallus.

A single lichen may contain several algal genotypes. These multiple genotypes may better enable response to adaptation to environmental changes, and enable the lichen to inhabit a wider range of environments.

=== Controversy over classification method and species names ===
There are about 20,000 known lichen species. But what is meant by "species" is different from what is meant by biological species in plants, animals, or fungi, where being the same species implies that there is a common ancestral lineage. Because lichens are combinations of members of two or even three different biological kingdoms, these components must have a different ancestral lineage from each other. By convention, lichens are still called "species" anyway, and are classified according to the species of their fungus, not the species of the algae or cyanobacteria. Lichens are given the same scientific name (binomial name) as the fungus in them, which may cause some confusion. The alga bears its own scientific name, which has no relationship to the name of the lichen or fungus.

Depending on context, "lichenized fungus" may refer to the entire lichen, or to the fungus when it is in the lichen, which can be grown in culture in isolation from the algae or cyanobacteria. Some algae and cyanobacteria are found naturally living outside of the lichen. The fungal, algal, or cyanobacterial component of a lichen can be grown by itself in culture. When growing by themselves, the fungus, algae, or cyanobacteria have very different properties than those of the lichen. Lichen properties such as growth form, physiology, and biochemistry, are very different from the combination of the properties of the fungus and the algae or cyanobacteria.

The same fungus growing in combination with different algae or cyanobacteria, can produce lichens that are very different in most properties, meeting non-DNA criteria for being different "species". Historically, these different combinations were classified as different species. When the fungus is identified as being the same using modern DNA methods, these apparently different species get reclassified as the same species under the current (2014) convention for classification by fungal component. This has led to debate about this classification convention. These apparently different "species" have their own independent evolutionary history.

There is also debate as to the appropriateness of giving the same binomial name to the fungus, and to the lichen that combines that fungus with an alga or cyanobacterium (synecdoche). This is especially the case when combining the same fungus with different algae or cyanobacteria produces dramatically different lichen organisms, which would be considered different species by any measure other than the DNA of the fungal component. If the whole lichen produced by the same fungus growing in association with different algae or cyanobacteria, were to be classified as different "species", the number of "lichen species" would be greater.

=== Diversity ===
The largest number of lichenized fungi occur in the Ascomycota, with about 40% of species forming such an association. Some of these lichenized fungi occur in orders with nonlichenized fungi that live as saprotrophs or plant parasites (for example, the Leotiales, Dothideales, and Pezizales). Other lichen fungi occur in only five orders in which all members are engaged in this habit (Orders Graphidales, Gyalectales, Peltigerales, Pertusariales, and Teloschistales). Overall, about 98% of lichens have an ascomycetous mycobiont. Next to the Ascomycota, the largest number of lichenized fungi occur in the unassigned fungi imperfecti, a catch-all category for fungi whose sexual form of reproduction has never been observed. Comparatively few basidiomycetes are lichenized, but these include agarics, such as species of Lichenomphalia, clavarioid fungi, such as species of Multiclavula, and corticioid fungi, such as species of Dictyonema.

=== Identification methods ===
Lichen identification uses growth form, microscopy and reactions to chemical tests.

The outcome of the "Pd test" is called "Pd", which is also used as an abbreviation for the chemical used in the test, para-phenylenediamine. If putting a drop on a lichen turns an area bright yellow to orange, this helps identify it as belonging to either the genus Cladonia or Lecanora.

== Evolution and paleontology ==
The fossil record for lichens is poor. The extreme habitats that lichens dominate, such as tundra, mountains, and deserts, are not ordinarily conducive to producing fossils. There are fossilized lichens embedded in amber. The fossilized Anzia is found in pieces of amber in northern Europe and dates back approximately 40 million years. Lichen fragments are also found in fossil leaf beds, such as Lobaria from Trinity County in northern California, US, dating back to the early to middle Miocene.

The oldest fossil lichen in which both symbiotic partners have been recovered is Winfrenatia, an early zygomycetous (Glomeromycotan) lichen symbiosis that may have involved controlled parasitism, is permineralized in the Rhynie Chert of Scotland, dating from early Early Devonian, about 400 million years ago. The slightly older fossil Spongiophyton has also been interpreted as a lichen on morphological and isotopic grounds, although the isotopic basis is decidedly shaky. It has been suggested that Silurian-Devonian fossils Nematothallus and Prototaxites were lichenized. However, as of 2026, Prototaxites is shown to have structures unlike any known fungus or plant, and may represent a separate extinct Eukaryotic kingdom. Thus lichenized Ascomycota and Basidiomycota were a component of Early Silurian-Devonian terrestrial ecosystems. Newer research suggests that lichen evolved after the evolution of land plants.

The ancestral ecological state of both Ascomycota and Basidiomycota was probably saprobism, and independent lichenization events may have occurred multiple times. In 1995, Gargas and colleagues proposed that there were at least five independent origins of lichenization; three in the basidiomycetes and at least two in the Ascomycetes. Lutzoni et al. (2001) suggest lichenization probably evolved earlier and was followed by multiple independent losses. Some non-lichen-forming fungi may have secondarily lost the ability to form a lichen association. As a result, lichenization has been viewed as a highly successful nutritional strategy.

Lichenized Glomeromycota may extend well back into the Precambrian. Lichen-like fossils consisting of coccoid cells (cyanobacteria?) and thin filaments (mucoromycotinan Glomeromycota?) are permineralized in marine phosphorite of the Doushantuo Formation in southern China. These fossils are thought to be 551 to 635 million years old or Ediacaran. Ediacaran acritarchs also have many similarities with Glomeromycotan vesicles and spores. It has also been claimed that Ediacaran fossils including Dickinsonia, were lichens, though this claim is widely rejected. Endosymbiotic Glomeromycota comparable with living Geosiphon may extend back into the Proterozoic in the form of 1500 million year old Horodyskia and 2200 million year old Diskagma. Discovery of these fossils suggest that fungi developed symbiotic partnerships with photoautotrophs long before the evolution of vascular plants, though the Ediacaran lichen hypothesis is largely rejected due to an inappropriate definition of lichens based on taphonomy and substrate ecology. However, a 2019 study by the same scientist who rejected the Ediacaran lichen hypothesis, Nelsen, used new time-calibrated phylogenies to conclude that there is no evidence of lichen before the existence of vascular plants.

Lecanoromycetes, one of the most common classes of lichen-forming fungi, diverged from its ancestor, which may have also been lichen forming, around 258 million years ago, during the late Paleozoic period. However, the closely related clade Euritiomycetes appears to have become lichen-forming only 52 million years ago, during the early Cenozoic period.

== Ecology and interactions with environment ==
=== Substrates and habitats ===
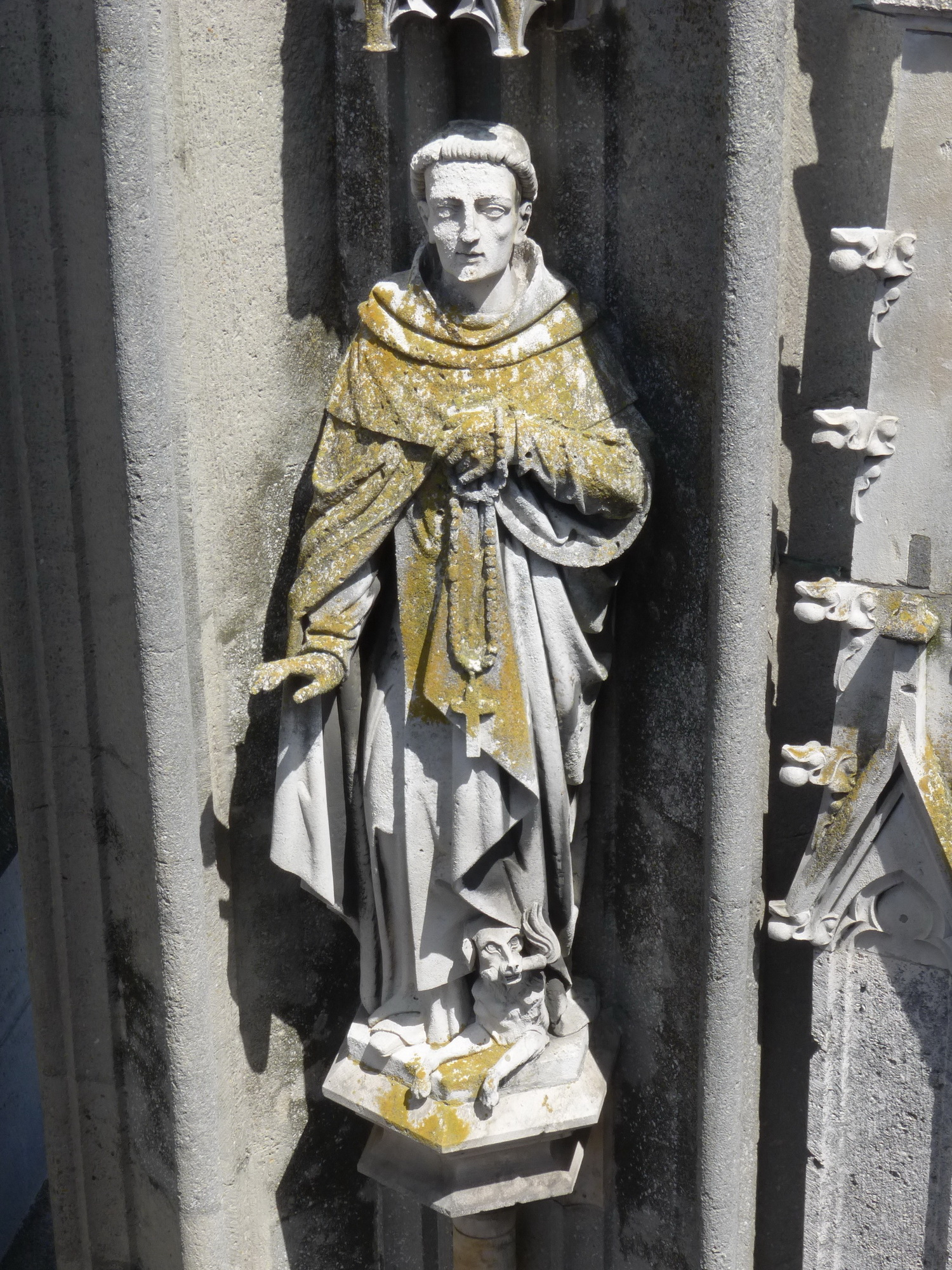
Lichens on a limestone statue on a tower of Regensburg Cathedral

Lichens grow on and in a wide range of substrates and habitats, including some of the most extreme conditions on earth. They are abundant growing on bark, leaves, and hanging from epiphyte branches in rain forests and in temperate woodland. They grow on bare rock, walls, gravestones, roofs, and exposed soil surfaces. They can survive in some of the most extreme environments on Earth: arctic tundra, hot dry deserts, rocky coasts, and toxic slag heaps. They can live inside solid rock, growing between the grains, and in the soil as part of a biological soil crust in arid habitats such as deserts. Some lichens do not grow on anything, living out their lives blowing about the environment.

When growing on mineral surfaces, some lichens slowly decompose their substrate by chemically degrading and physically disrupting the minerals, contributing to the process of weathering by which rocks are gradually turned into soil. While this contribution to weathering is usually benign, it can cause problems for artificial stone structures. For example, there is an ongoing lichen growth problem on Mount Rushmore National Memorial that requires the employment of mountain-climbing conservators to clean the monument.

Lichens are not parasites on the plants they grow on, but only use them as a substrate. The fungi of some lichen species may "take over" the algae of other lichen species. Lichens make their own food from their photosynthetic parts and by absorbing minerals from the environment. Lichens growing on leaves may have the appearance of being parasites on the leaves, but they are not. Some lichens in Diploschistes parasitise other lichens. Diploschistes muscorum starts its development in the tissue of a host Cladonia species.

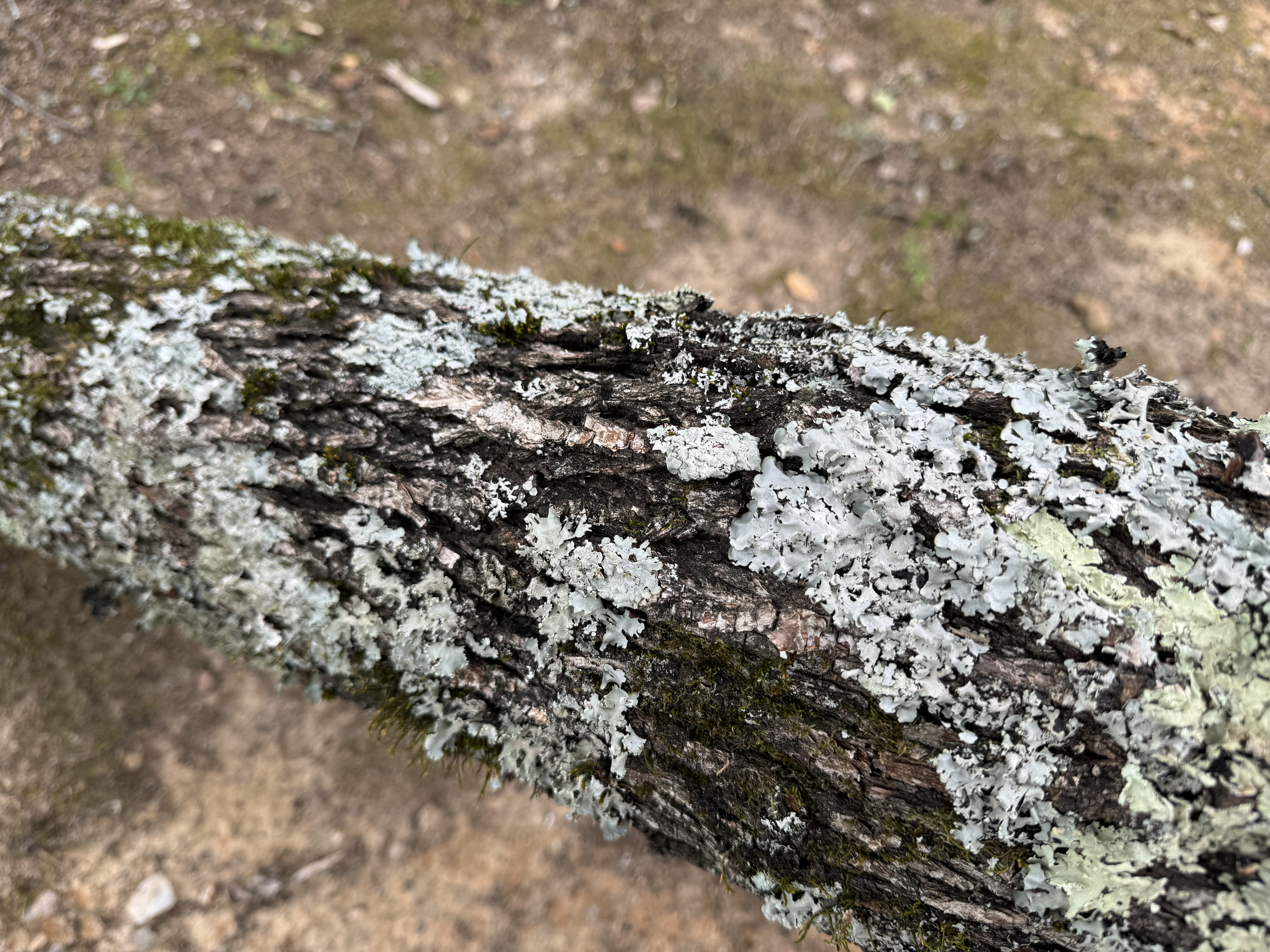
Lichen on a fallen branch

In the arctic tundra, lichens, together with mosses and liverworts, make up the majority of the ground cover, which helps insulate the ground and may provide forage for grazing animals. An example is "reindeer moss", which is a lichen, not a moss.

There are only two species of known permanently submerged lichens; Hydrothyria venosa is found in fresh water environments, and Verrucaria serpuloides is found in marine environments.

A crustose lichen that grows on rock is called a saxicolous lichen. Crustose lichens that grow on the rock are epilithic, and those that grow immersed inside rock, growing between the crystals with only their fruiting bodies exposed to the air, are called endolithic lichens. A crustose lichen that grows on bark is called a corticolous lichen. A lichen that grows on wood from which the bark has been stripped is called a lignicolous lichen. Lichens that grow immersed inside plant tissues are called endophloidic lichens or endophloidal lichens. Lichens that use leaves as substrates, whether the leaf is still on the tree or on the ground, are called epiphyllous or foliicolous. A terricolous lichen grows on the soil as a substrate. Many squamulose lichens are terricolous. Umbilicate lichens are foliose lichens that are attached to the substrate at only one point. A vagrant lichen is not attached to a substrate at all, and lives its life being blown around by the wind.

=== Lichens and soils ===
In addition to distinct physical mechanisms by which lichens break down raw stone, studies indicate lichens attack stone chemically, entering newly chelated minerals into the ecology. The substances exuded by lichens, known for their strong ability to bind and sequester metals, along with the common formation of new minerals, especially metal oxalates, and the traits of the substrates they alter, all highlight the important role lichens play in the process of chemical weathering. Over time, this activity creates new fertile soil from stone.

Lichens may be important in contributing nitrogen to soils in some deserts through being eaten, along with their rock substrate, by snails, which then defecate, putting the nitrogen into the soils. Lichens help bind and stabilize soil sand in dunes. In deserts and semi-arid areas, lichens are part of extensive, living biological soil crusts, essential for maintaining the soil structure.

=== Ecological interactions ===
Lichens are pioneer species, among the first living things to grow on bare rock or areas denuded of life by a disaster. Lichens may have to compete with plants for access to sunlight, but because of their small size and slow growth, they thrive in places where higher plants have difficulty growing. Lichens are often the first to settle in places lacking soil, constituting the sole vegetation in some extreme environments such as those found at high mountain elevations and at high latitudes. Some survive in the tough conditions of deserts, and others on frozen soil of the Arctic regions.

A major ecophysiological advantage of lichens is that they are poikilohydric (poikilo- variable, hydric- relating to water), meaning that though they have little control over the status of their hydration, they can tolerate irregular and extended periods of severe desiccation. Like some mosses, liverworts, ferns and a few resurrection plants, upon desiccation, lichens enter a metabolic suspension or stasis (known as cryptobiosis) in which the cells of the lichen symbionts are dehydrated to a degree that halts most biochemical activity. In this cryptobiotic state, lichens can survive wider extremes of temperature, radiation and drought in the harsh environments they often inhabit.

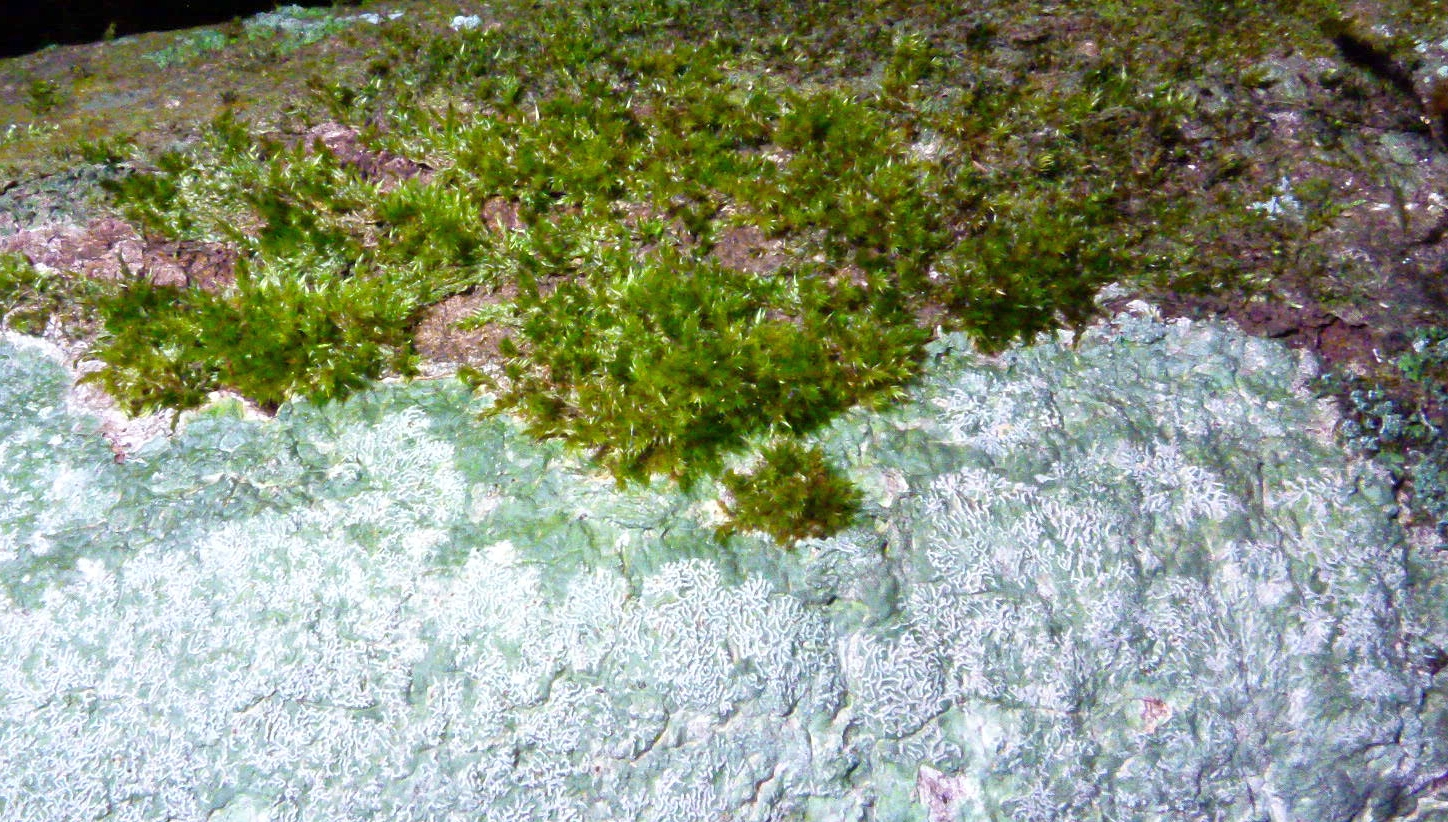
Lichens suppress the growth of mosses and higher plants around them

Lichens do not have roots and do not need to tap continuous reservoirs of water like most higher plants, thus they can grow in locations impossible for most plants, such as bare rock, sterile soil or sand, and various artificial structures such as walls, roofs, and monuments. Many lichens also grow as epiphytes (epi- on the surface, phyte- plant) on plants, particularly on the trunks and branches of trees. When growing on plants, lichens are not parasites; they do not consume any part of the plant nor poison it. Lichens produce allelopathic chemicals that inhibit the growth of mosses. Some ground-dwelling lichens, such as members of the subgenus Cladina (reindeer lichens), produce allelopathic chemicals that leach into the soil and inhibit the germination of seeds, spruce and other plants. Stability (that is, longevity) of their substrate is a major factor of lichen habitats. Most lichens grow on stable rock surfaces or the bark of old trees, but many others grow on soil and sand. In these latter cases, lichens are often an important part of soil stabilization; indeed, in some desert ecosystems, vascular (higher) plant seeds cannot become established except in places where lichen crusts stabilize the sand and help retain water.

Lichens may be eaten by some animals, such as reindeer, living in arctic regions. The larvae of a number of Lepidoptera species feed exclusively on lichens. These include common footman and marbled beauty. They are very low in protein and high in carbohydrates, making them unsuitable for some animals. The Northern flying squirrel uses it for nesting, food and winter water.

=== Effects of air pollution ===
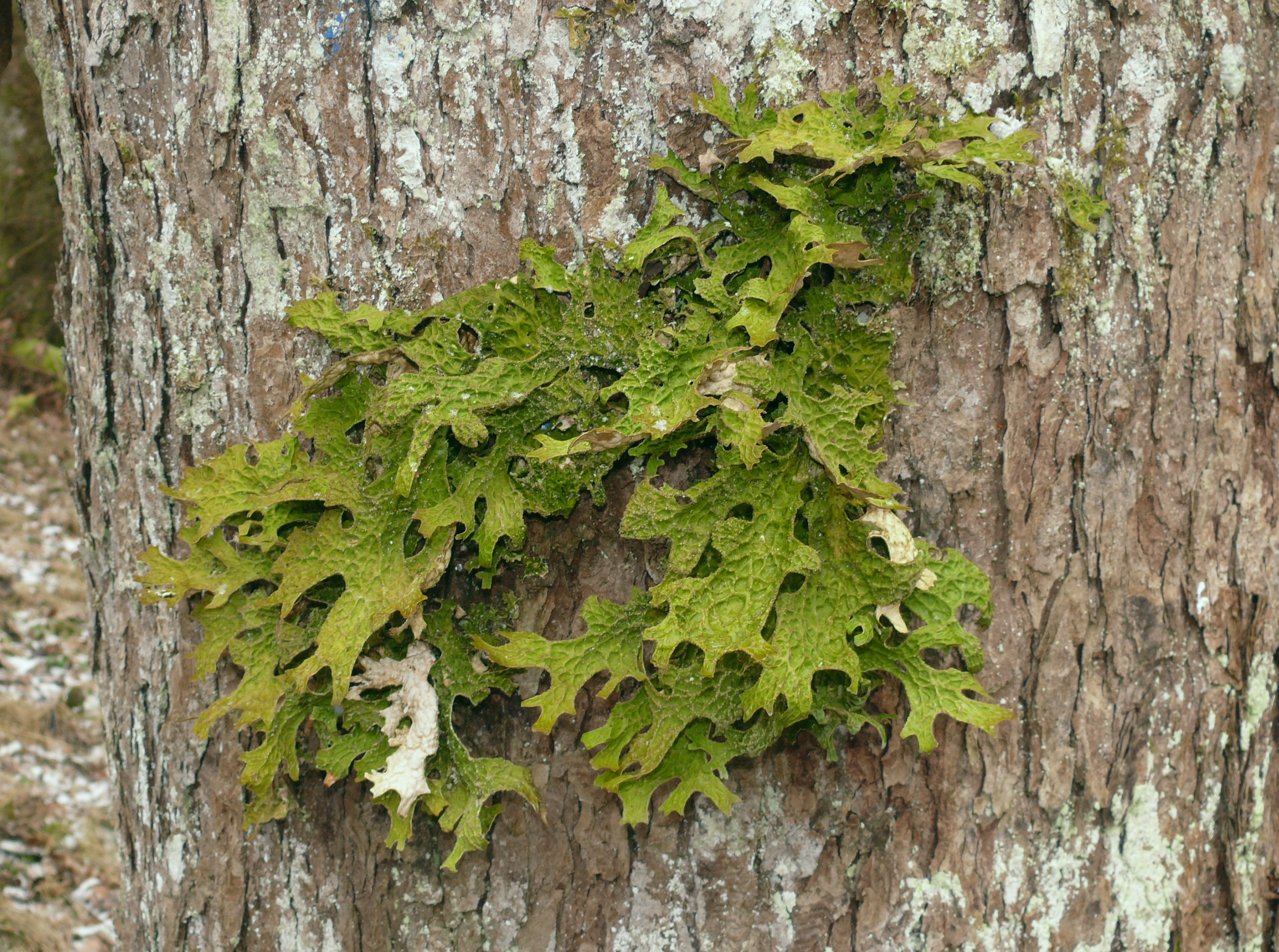
Some lichens, like the foliose Lobaria pulmonaria, are sensitive to air pollution.

If lichens are exposed to air pollutants at all times, without any deciduous parts, they are unable to avoid the accumulation of pollutants. Also lacking stomata and a cuticle, lichens may absorb aerosols and gases over the entire thallus surface from which they may readily diffuse to the photobiont layer. Because lichens do not possess roots, their primary source of most elements is the air, and therefore elemental levels in lichens often reflect the accumulated composition of ambient air. The processes by which atmospheric deposition occurs include fog and dew, gaseous absorption, and dry deposition. Consequently, environmental studies with lichens emphasize their feasibility as effective biomonitors of atmospheric quality.

Not all lichens are equally sensitive to air pollutants, so different lichen species show different levels of sensitivity to specific atmospheric pollutants. The sensitivity of a lichen to air pollution is directly related to the energy needs of the mycobiont, so that the stronger the dependency of the mycobiont on the photobiont, the more sensitive the lichen is to air pollution. Upon exposure to air pollution, the photobiont may use metabolic energy for repair of its cellular structures that would otherwise be used for maintenance of its photosynthetic activity, therefore leaving less metabolic energy available for the mycobiont. The alteration of the balance between the photobiont and mycobiont can lead to the breakdown of the symbiotic association. Therefore, lichen decline may result not only from the accumulation of toxic substances, but also from altered nutrient supplies that favor one symbiont over the other.

This interaction between lichens and air pollution has been used as a means of monitoring air quality since 1859, with more systematic methods developed by William Nylander in 1866.

== Human use ==
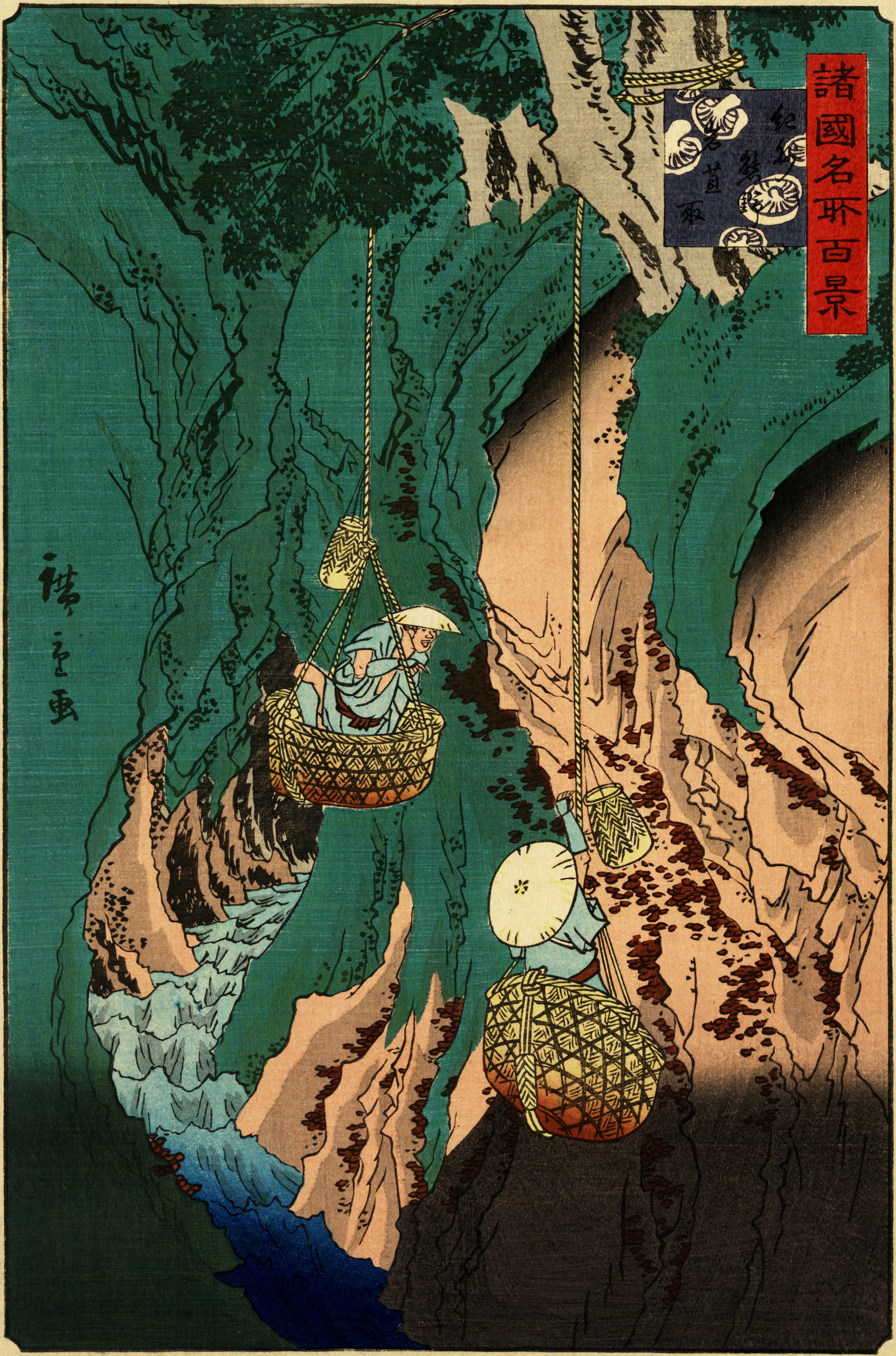
Iwatake (Umbilicaria esculenta) gathering at Kumano in Kishū, by Hiroshige II

=== Food ===
Lichens are eaten by many different cultures across the world. Although some lichens are only eaten in times of famine, others are a staple food or even a delicacy. Two obstacles are often encountered when eating lichens: lichen polysaccharides are generally indigestible to humans, and lichens usually contain mildly toxic secondary compounds that should be removed before eating. Very few lichens are poisonous, but those high in vulpinic acid or usnic acid are toxic. Most poisonous lichens are yellow.

In the past, Iceland moss (Cetraria islandica) was an important source of food for humans in northern Europe, and was cooked as a bread, porridge, pudding, soup, or salad. It is also fed to cattle, pigs and ponies. Bryoria fremontii (edible horsehair lichen) was an important food in parts of North America, where it was usually pitcooked. Northern peoples in North America and Siberia traditionally eat the partially digested reindeer lichen (Cladina spp.) after they remove it from the rumen of caribou or reindeer that have been killed. Rock tripe (Umbilicaria spp. and Lasalia spp.) is a lichen that has frequently been used as an emergency food in North America, and one species, Umbilicaria esculenta, (iwatake in Japanese) is used in a variety of traditional Korean and Japanese foods.

=== Lichenometry ===
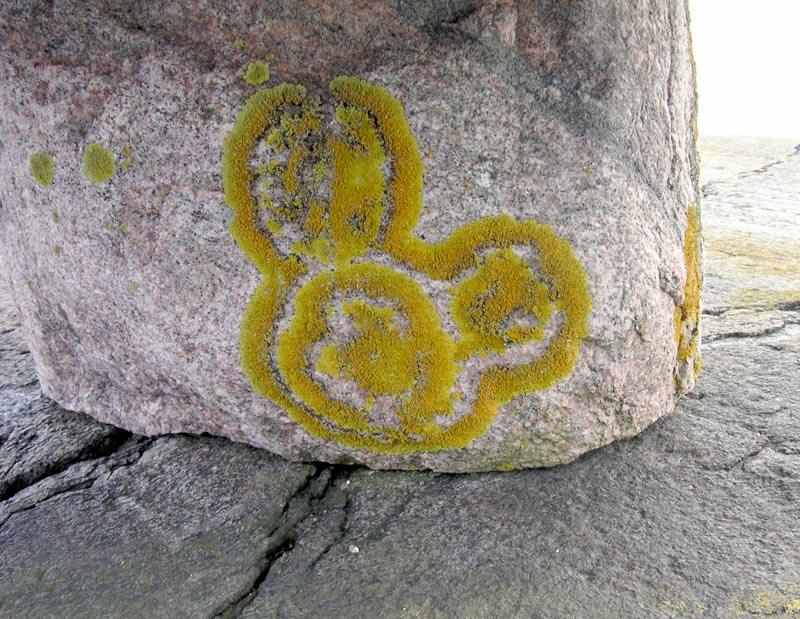
Lichen grown in a Mickey Mouse shape

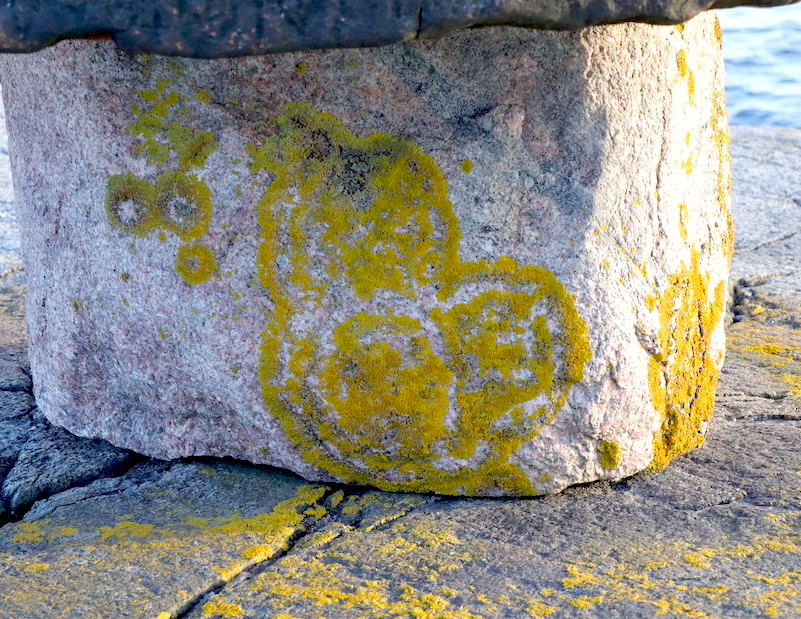
13 years later

Lichenometry is a technique used to determine the age of exposed rock surfaces based on the size of lichen thalli. Introduced by Beschel in the 1950s, the technique has found many applications. it is used in archaeology, palaeontology, and geomorphology. It uses the presumed regular but slow rate of lichen growth to determine the age of exposed rock. Measuring the diameter (or other size measurement) of the largest lichen of a species on a rock surface indicates the length of time since the rock surface was first exposed. Lichen can be preserved on old rock faces for up to 10,000 years, providing the maximum age limit of the technique, though it is most accurate (within 10% error) when applied to surfaces that have been exposed for less than 1,000 years. Lichenometry is especially useful for dating surfaces less than 500 years old, as radiocarbon dating techniques are less accurate over this period. The lichens most commonly used for lichenometry are those of the genera Rhizocarpon (e.g. the species Rhizocarpon geographicum, map lichen) and Xanthoria.

=== Biodegradation ===
Lichens have been shown to degrade polyester resins, as can be seen in archaeological sites in the Roman city of Baelo Claudia in Spain. Lichens can accumulate several environmental pollutants such as lead, copper, and radionuclides. Some species of lichen, such as Parmelia sulcata (called a hammered shield lichen, among other names) and Lobaria pulmonaria (lung lichen), and many in the Cladonia genus, have been shown to produce serine proteases capable of the degradation of pathogenic forms of prion protein (PrP), which may be useful in treating contaminated environmental reservoirs.

=== Dyes ===
Many lichens produce secondary compounds, including pigments that reduce harmful amounts of sunlight and powerful toxins that deter herbivores or kill bacteria. These compounds are very useful for lichen identification, and have had economic importance as dyes such as cudbear or primitive antibiotics.

A pH indicator (which can indicate acidic or basic substances) called litmus is a dye extracted from the lichen Roccella tinctoria ("dyer's weed") by boiling. It gives its name to the well-known litmus test.

Traditional dyes of the Scottish Highlands for Harris tweed and other traditional cloths were made from lichens, including the orange Xanthoria parietina ("common orange lichen") and the grey foliaceous Parmelia saxatilis common on rocks and known colloquially as "crottle".

There are reports dating almost 2,000 years old of lichens being used to make purple and red dyes. Of great historical and commercial significance are lichens belonging to the family Roccellaceae, commonly called orchella weed or orchil. Orcein and other lichen dyes have largely been replaced by synthetic versions.

=== Traditional medicine and research ===
Historically, in traditional medicine of Europe, Lobaria pulmonaria was collected in large quantities as "lungwort", due to its lung-like appearance (the "doctrine of signatures" suggesting that herbs can treat body parts that they physically resemble). Similarly, Peltigera leucophlebia ("ruffled freckled pelt") was used as a supposed cure for thrush, due to the resemblance of its cephalodia to the appearance of the disease.

Lichens produce metabolites being researched for their potential therapeutic or diagnostic value. Some metabolites produced by lichens are structurally and functionally similar to broad-spectrum antibiotics while few are associated respectively to antiseptic similarities. Usnic acid is the most commonly studied metabolite produced by lichens. It is also under research as a bactericidal agent against Escherichia coli and Staphylococcus aureus.

=== Recreational and entheogenic use ===
There are reports that some lichen, for instance those growing on volcanic rocks in Iceland, are hallucinogenic. These lichen have been reported to be consumed by locals for recreational purposes, with the preparation referred to as "rock soup". Other reportedly hallucinogenic lichen, such as Dictyonema huaorani, which may contain the serotonergic psychedelic psilocybin, have also been described.

=== Aesthetic appeal ===
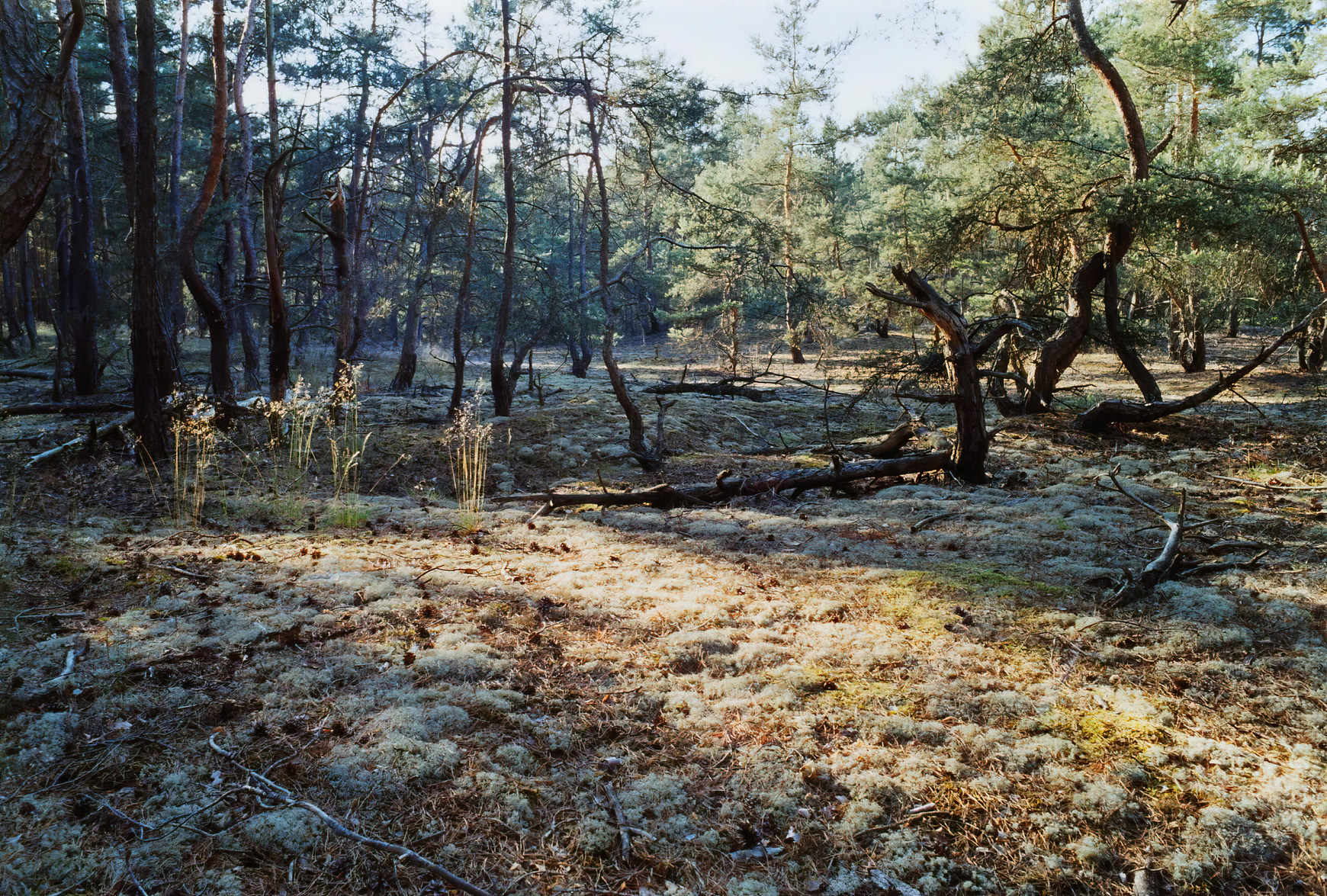
Pine forest with Cladonia lichen ground-cover

Colonies of lichens may be spectacular in appearance, dominating the surface of the visual landscape as part of the aesthetic appeal to visitors of Yosemite National Park, Sequoia National Park, and the Bay of Fires. Orange and yellow lichens add to the ambience of desert trees, tundras, and rocky seashores. Intricate webs of lichens hanging from tree branches add a mysterious aspect to forests. Fruticose lichens are used in model railroading and other modeling hobbies as a material for making miniature trees and shrubs.

=== In literature ===
In early Midrashic literature, the Hebrew word "vayilafeth" in Ruth 3:8 is explained as referring to Ruth entwining herself around Boaz like lichen. The 10th century Arab physician Al-Tamimi mentions lichens dissolved in vinegar and rose water being used in his day for the treatment of skin diseases and rashes.

The plot of John Wyndham's science fiction novel Trouble with Lichen revolves around an anti-aging chemical extracted from a lichen.

== History ==
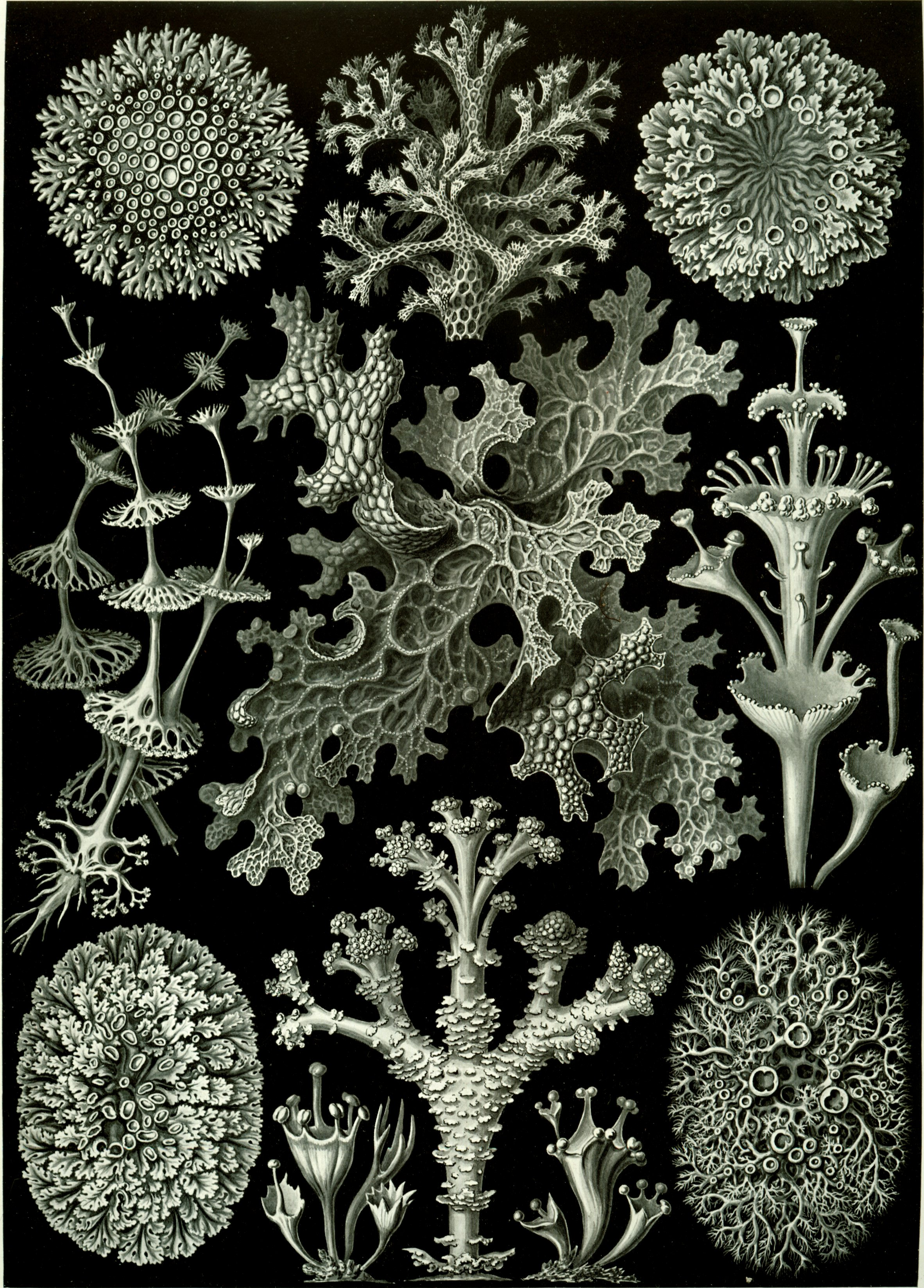
"Lichenes" fancifully drawn by Ernst Haeckel to emphasize his ideas of symmetry in his Artforms of Nature, 1904

Although lichens had been recognized as organisms for quite some time, it was not until 1867, when Swiss botanist Simon Schwendener proposed his dual theory of lichens, that lichens are a combination of fungi with algae or cyanobacteria, whereby the true nature of the lichen association began to emerge. Schwendener's hypothesis, which at the time lacked experimental evidence, arose from his extensive analysis of the anatomy and development in lichens, algae, and fungi using a light microscope. Many of the leading lichenologists at the time, such as James Crombie and Nylander, rejected Schwendener's hypothesis because the consensus was that all living organisms were autonomous.

Other prominent biologists, such as Heinrich Anton de Bary, Albert Bernhard Frank, Beatrix Potter, Melchior Treub and Hermann Hellriegel, were not so quick to reject Schwendener's ideas and the concept soon spread into other areas of study, such as microbial, plant, animal and human pathogens. When the complex relationships between pathogenic microorganisms and their hosts were finally identified, Schwendener's hypothesis began to gain popularity. Further experimental proof of the dual nature of lichens was obtained when Eugen Thomas published his results in 1939 on the first successful re-synthesis experiment.

In the 2010s, a new facet of the fungi–algae partnership was discovered. Toby Spribille and colleagues found that many types of lichen that were long thought to be ascomycete–algae pairs were actually ascomycete–basidiomycete–algae trios. The third symbiotic partner in many lichens is a basidiomycete yeast.

== Gallery ==
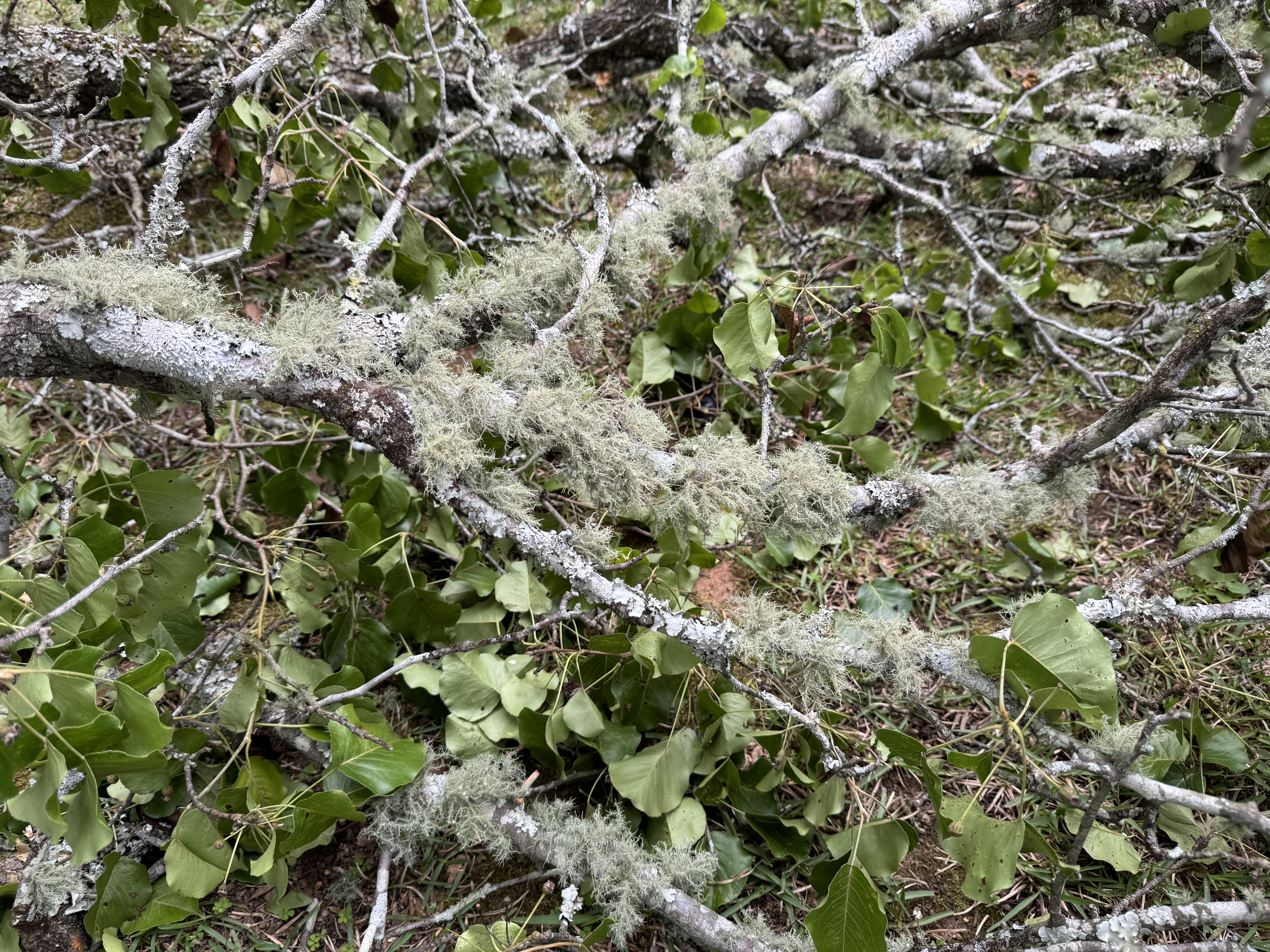

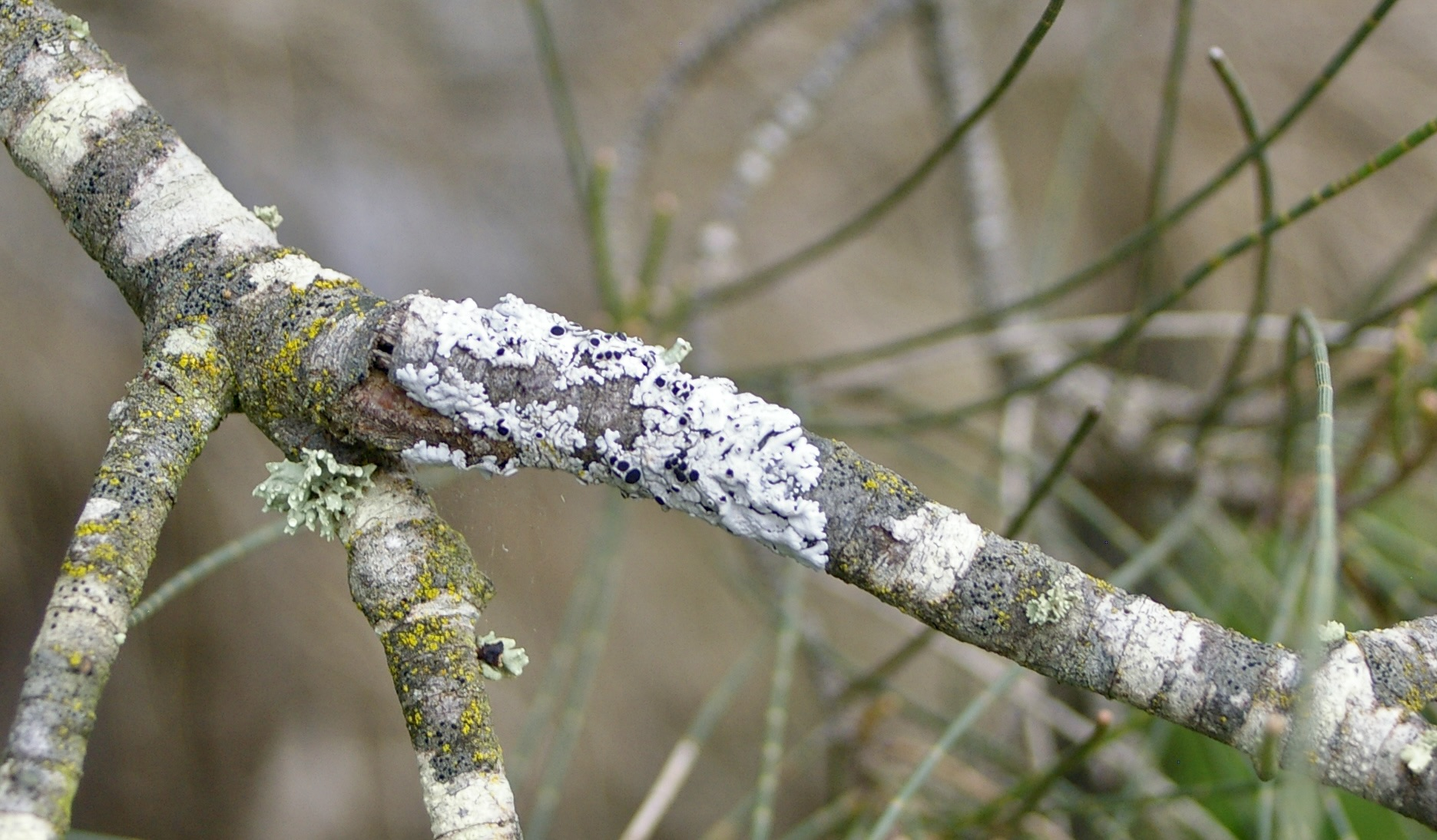

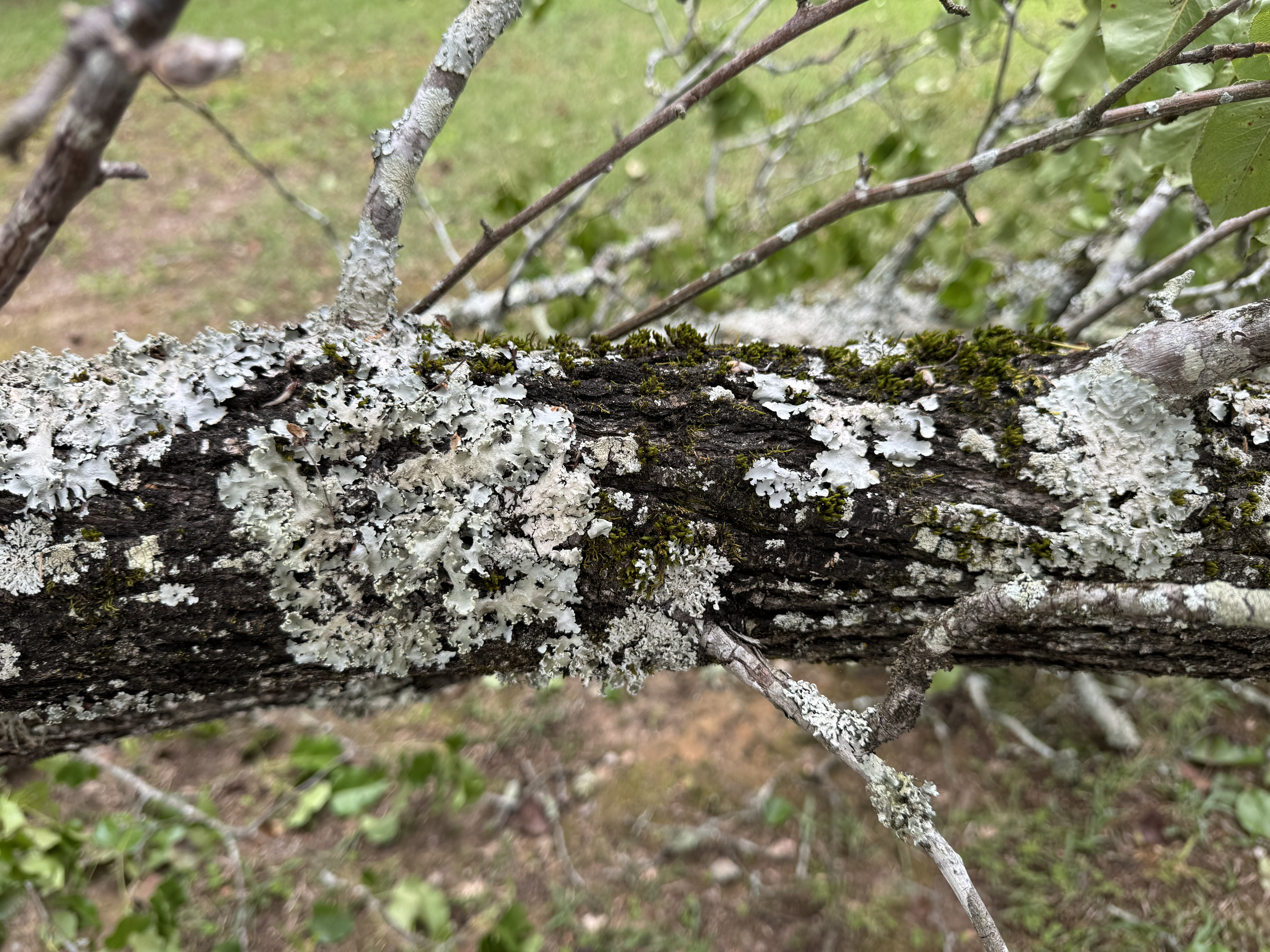

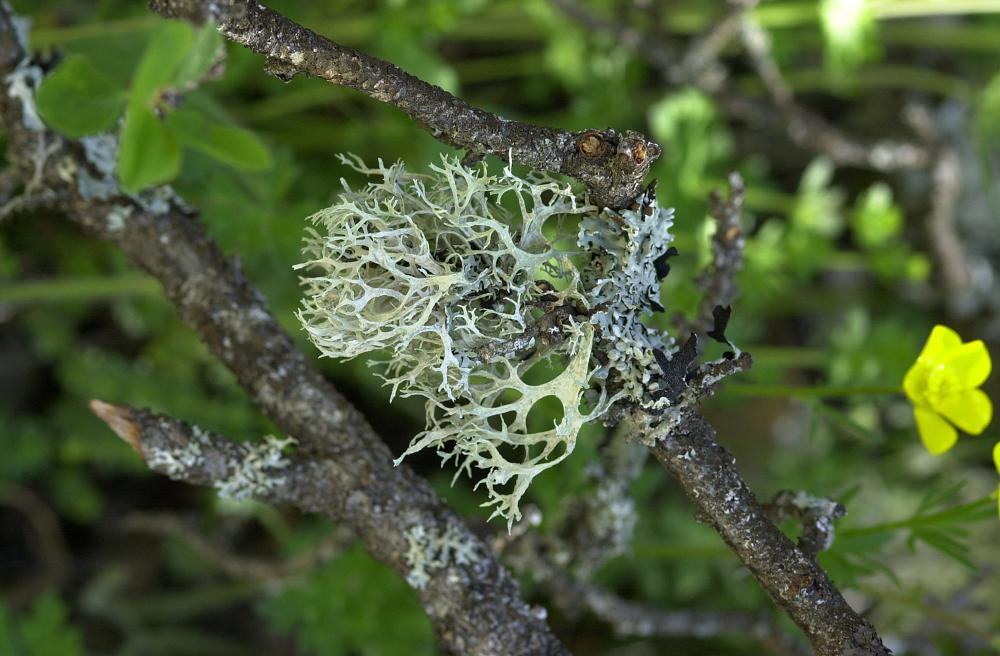

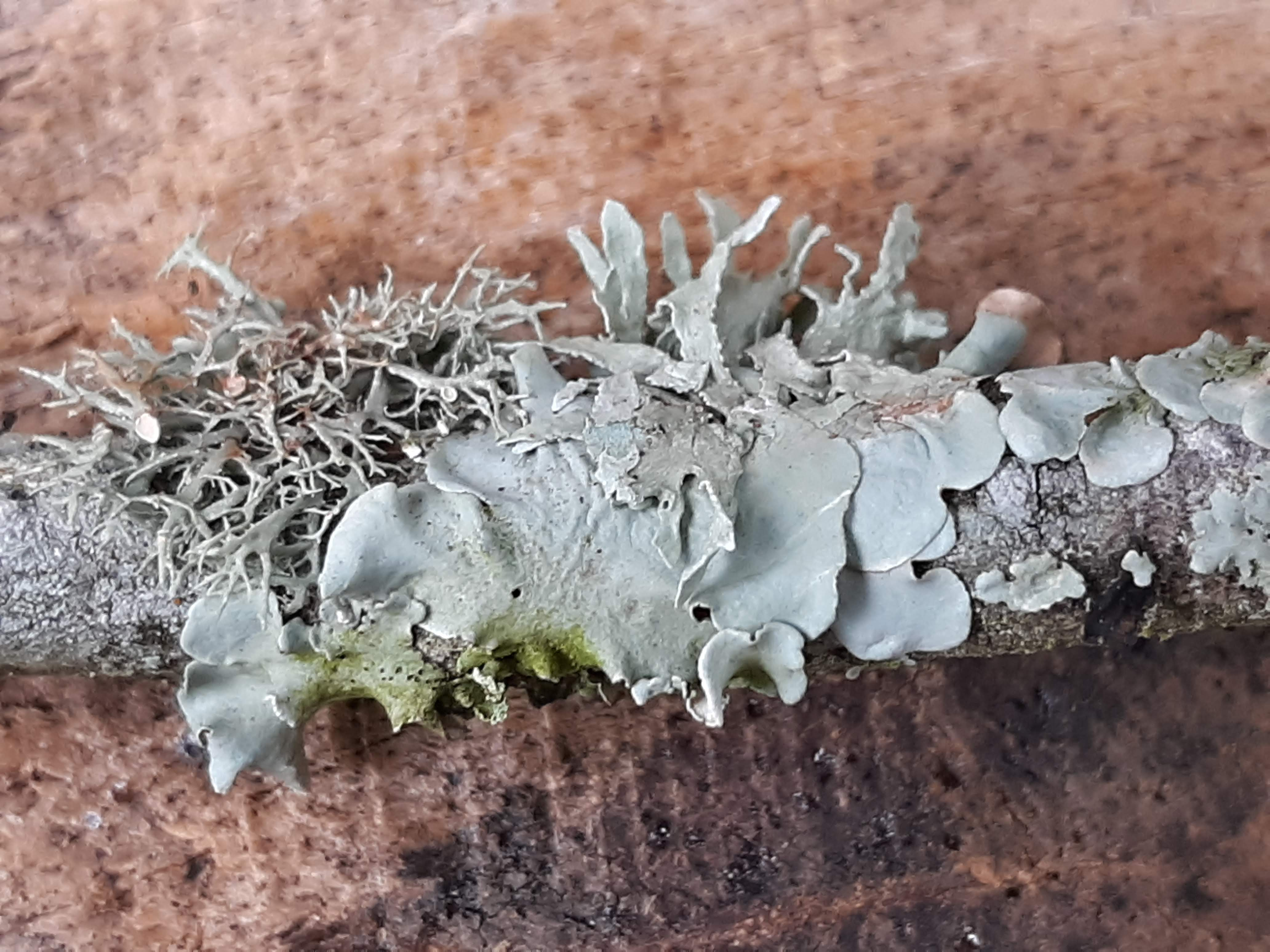

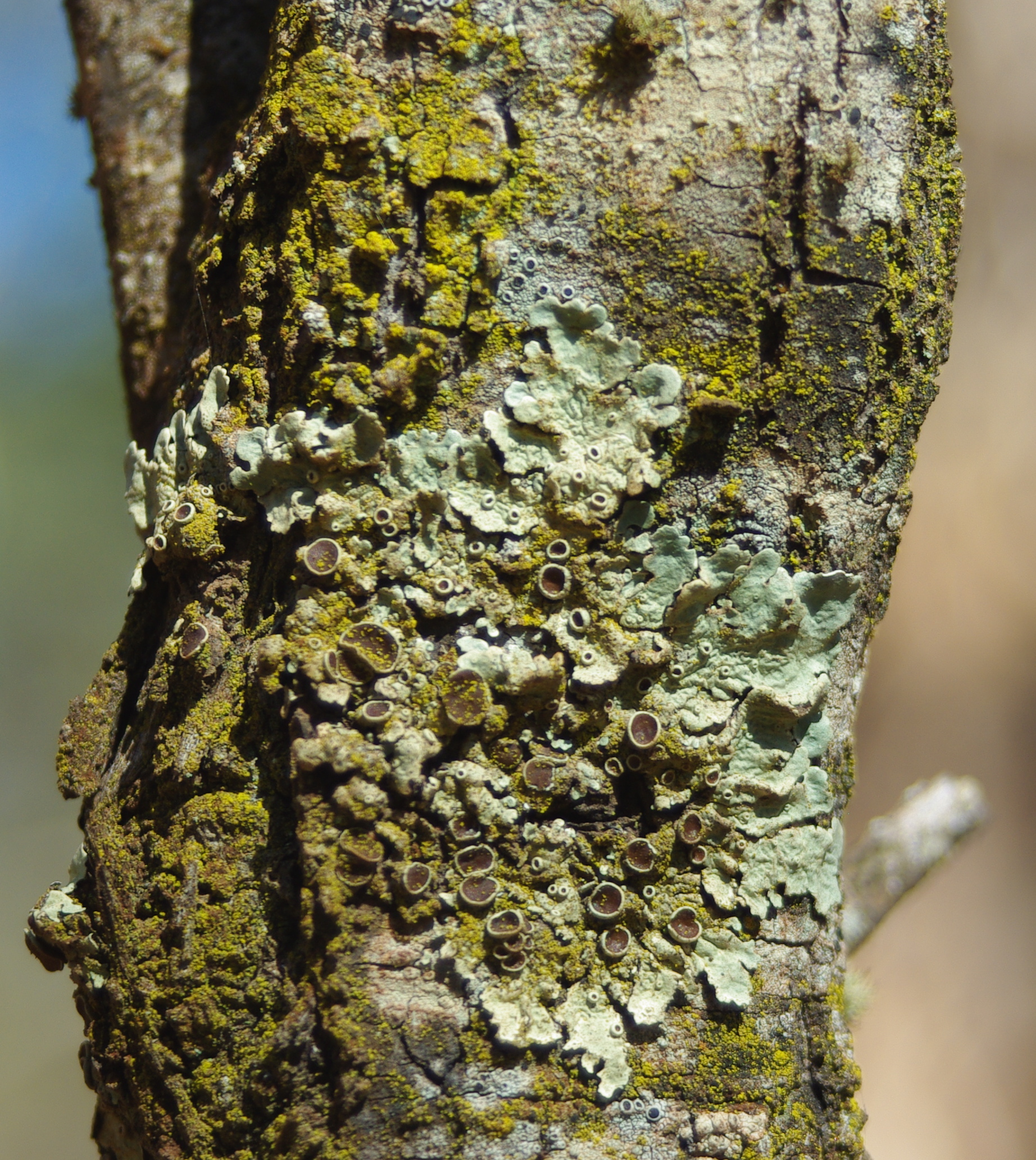

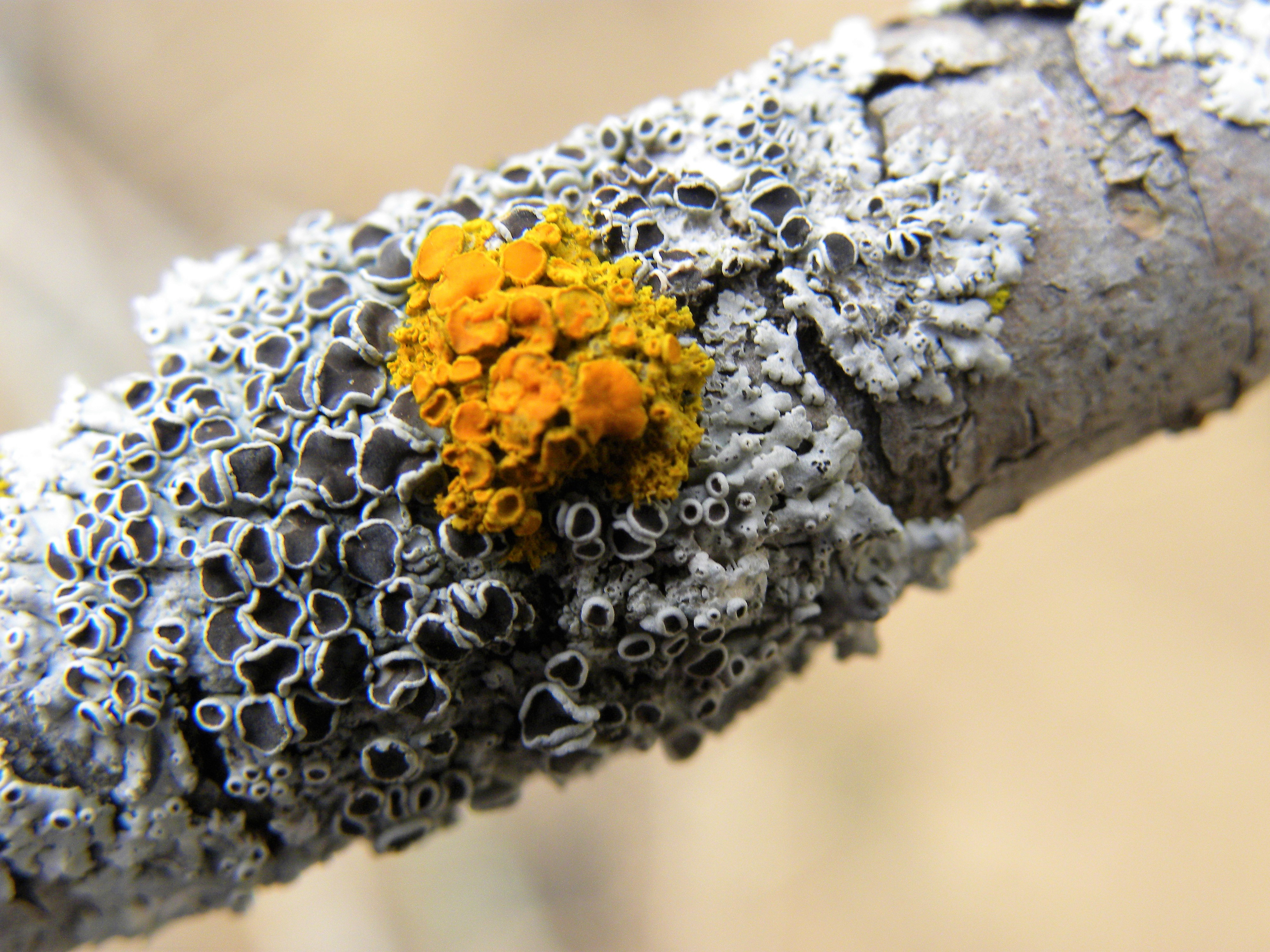

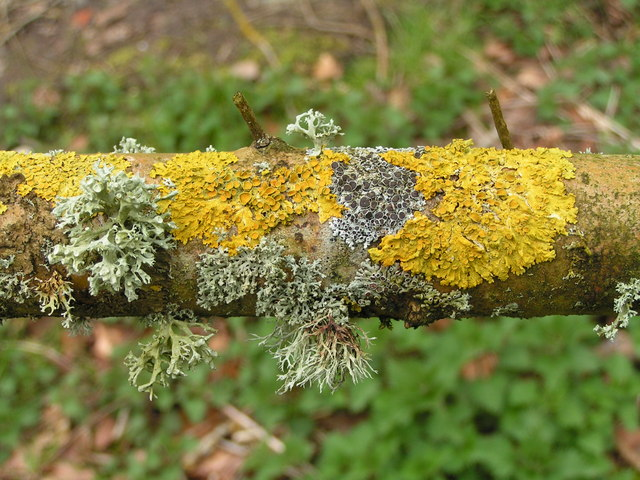

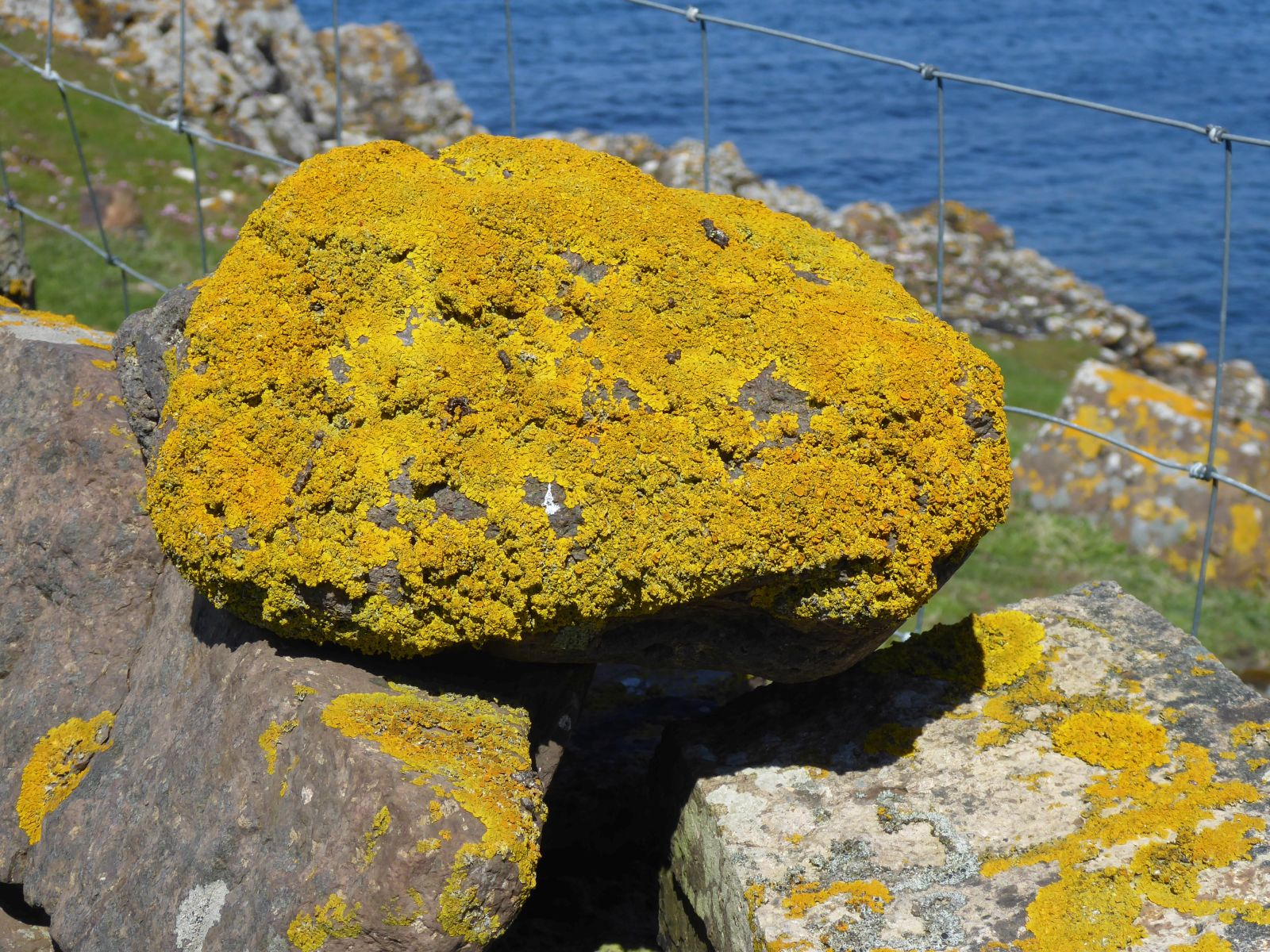

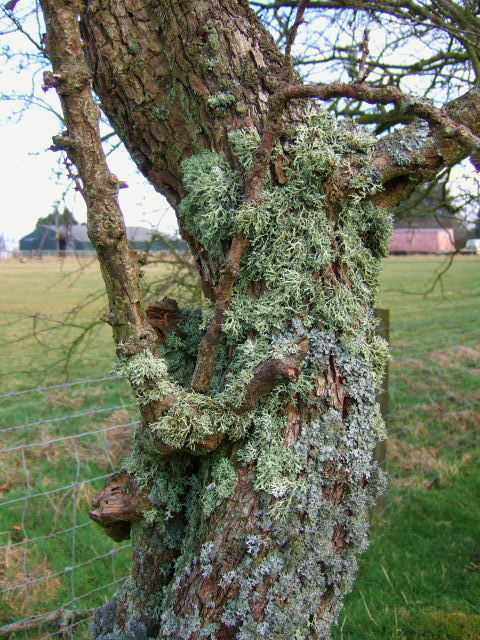

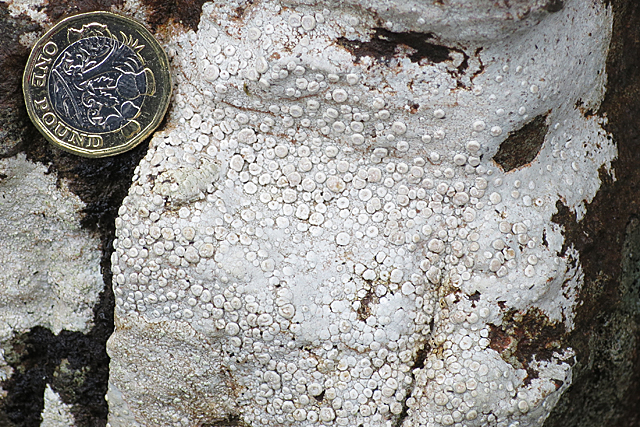

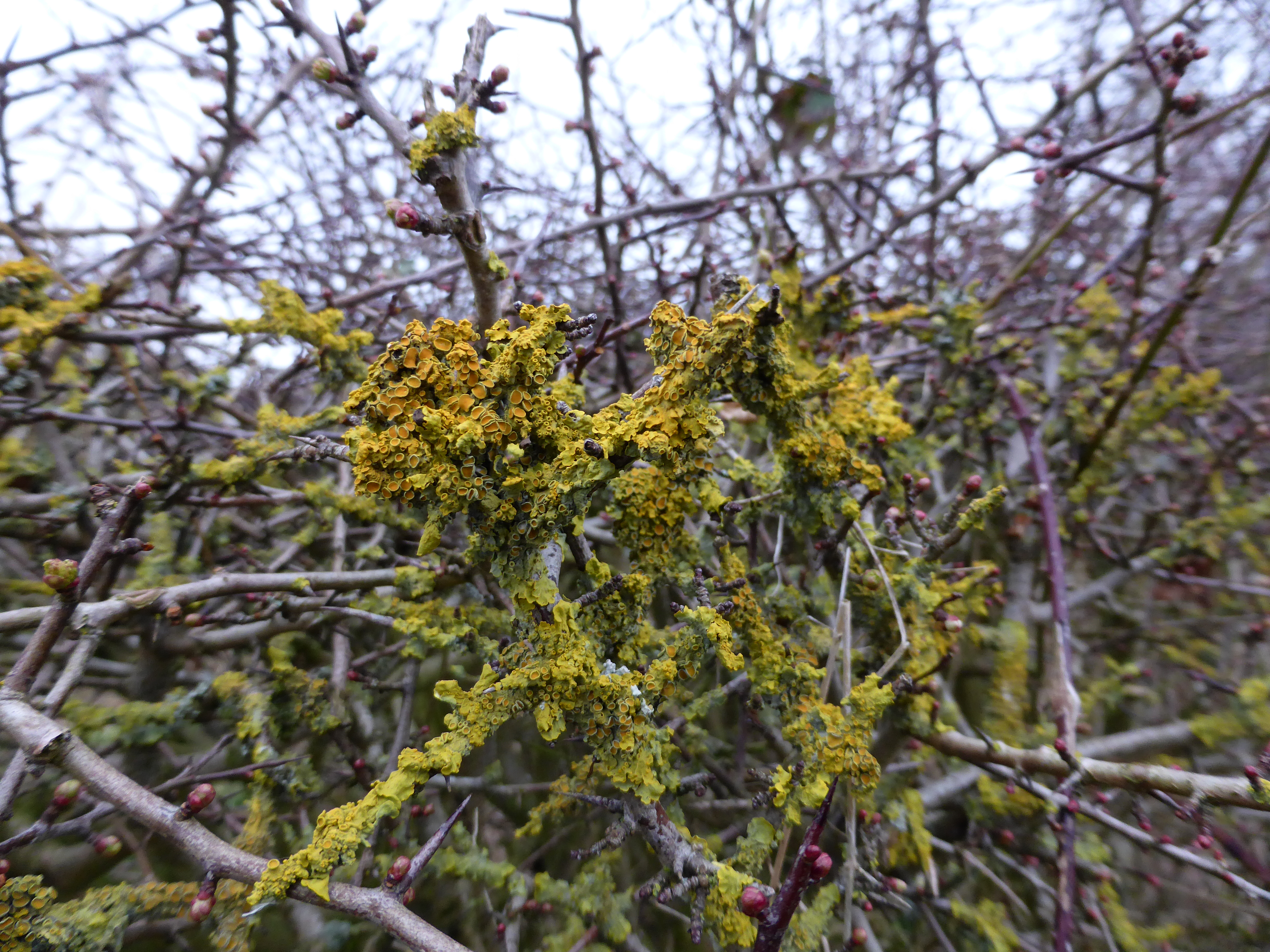

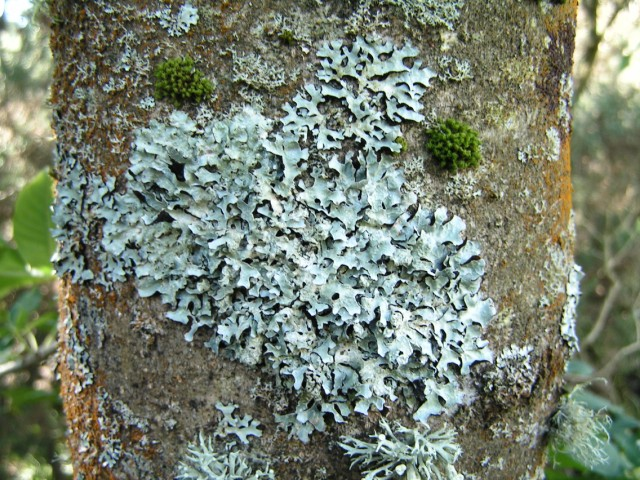

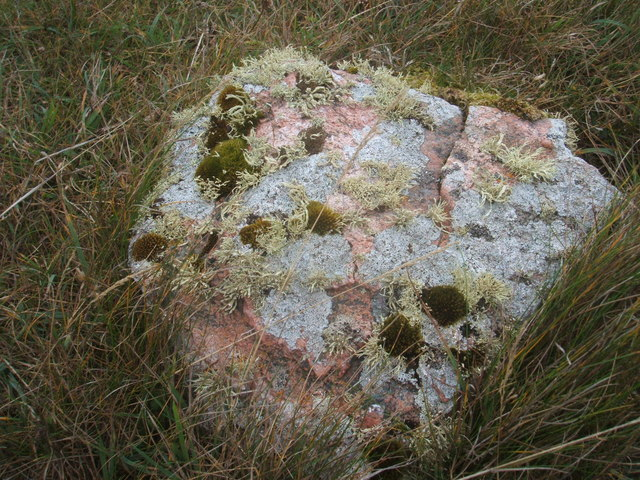

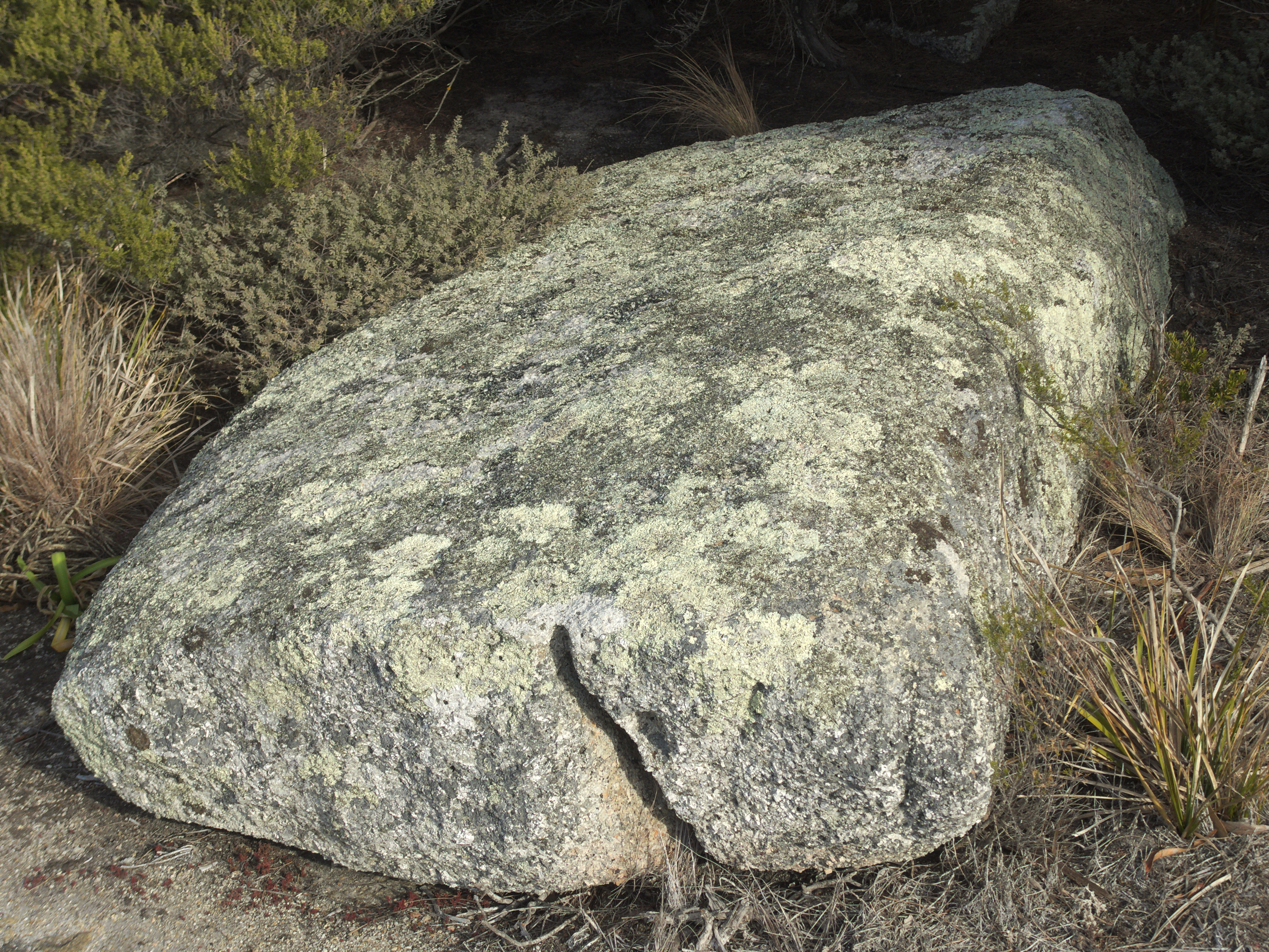

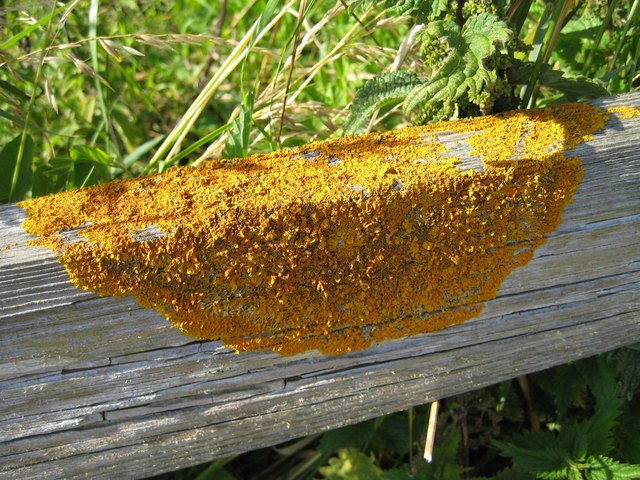

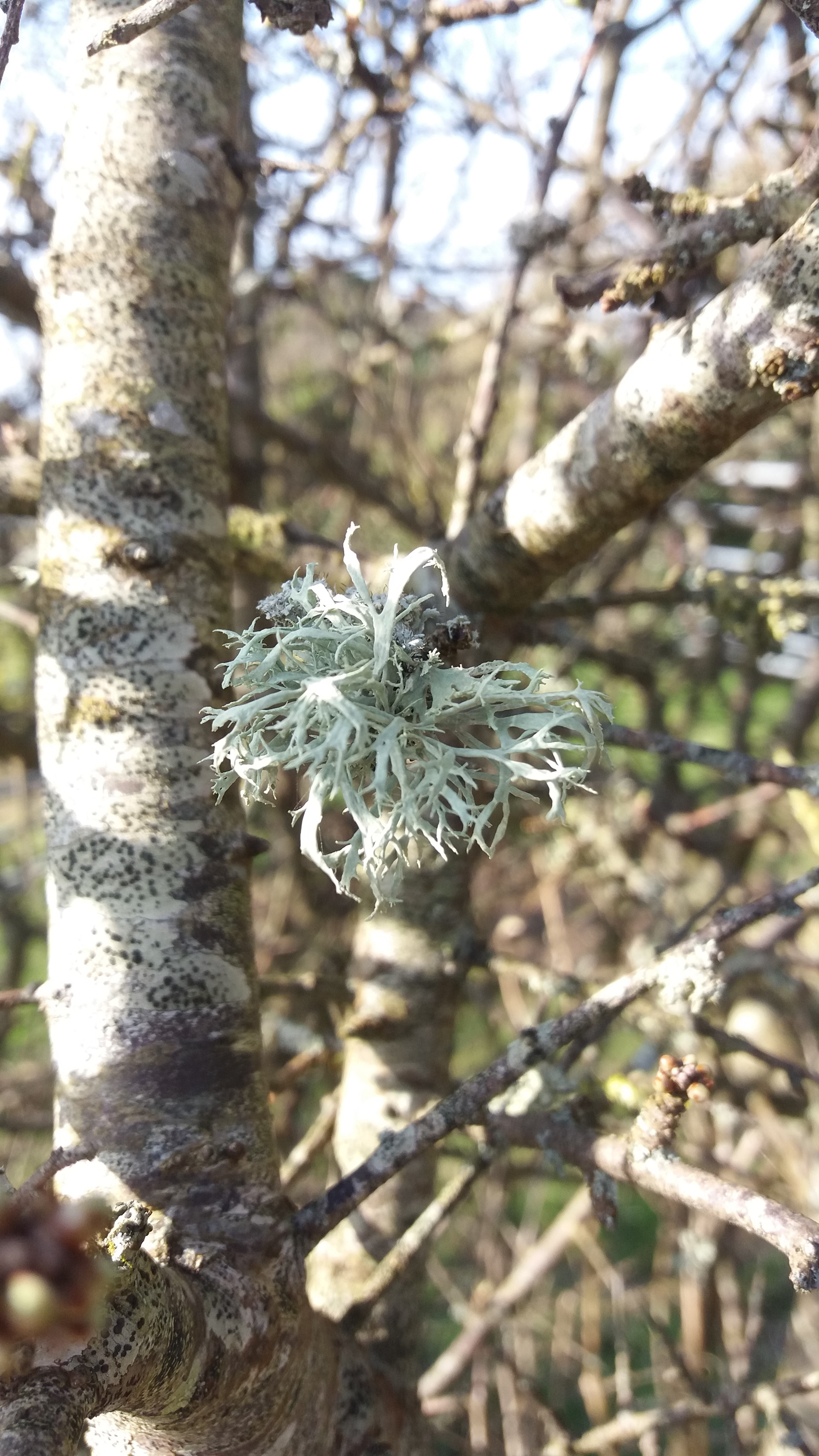

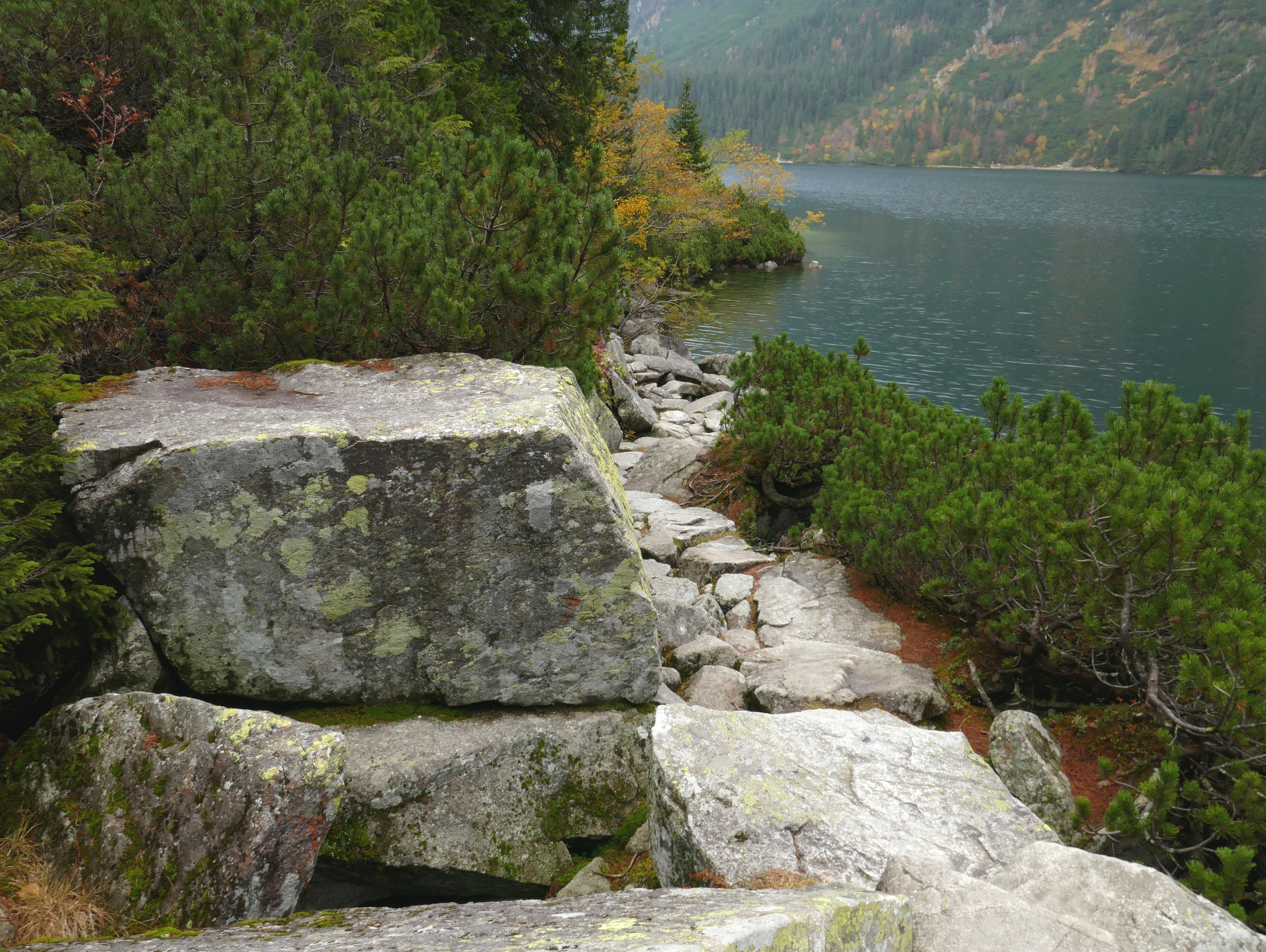

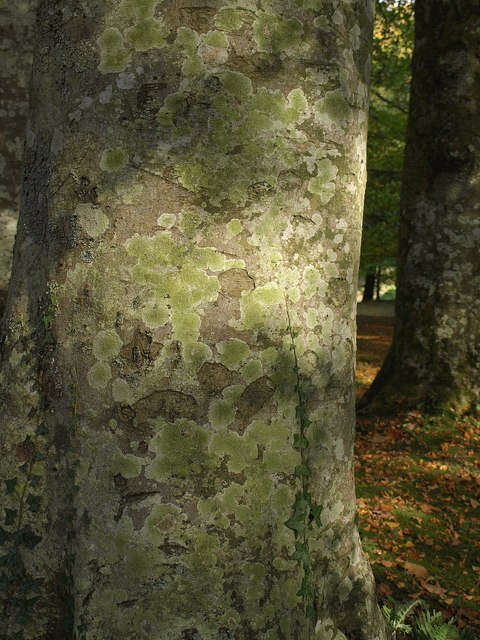

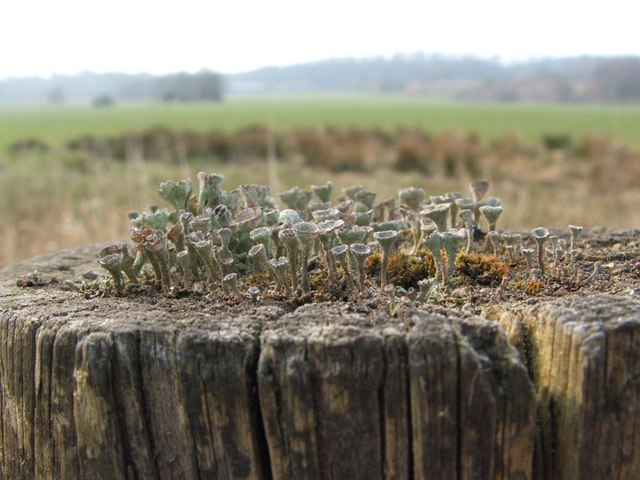

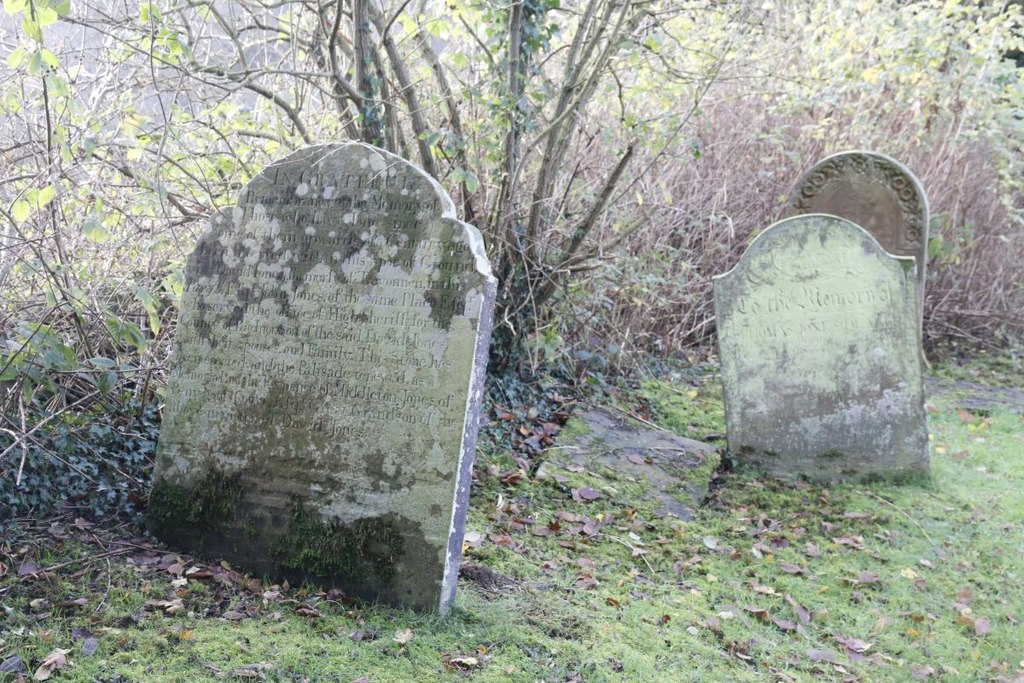

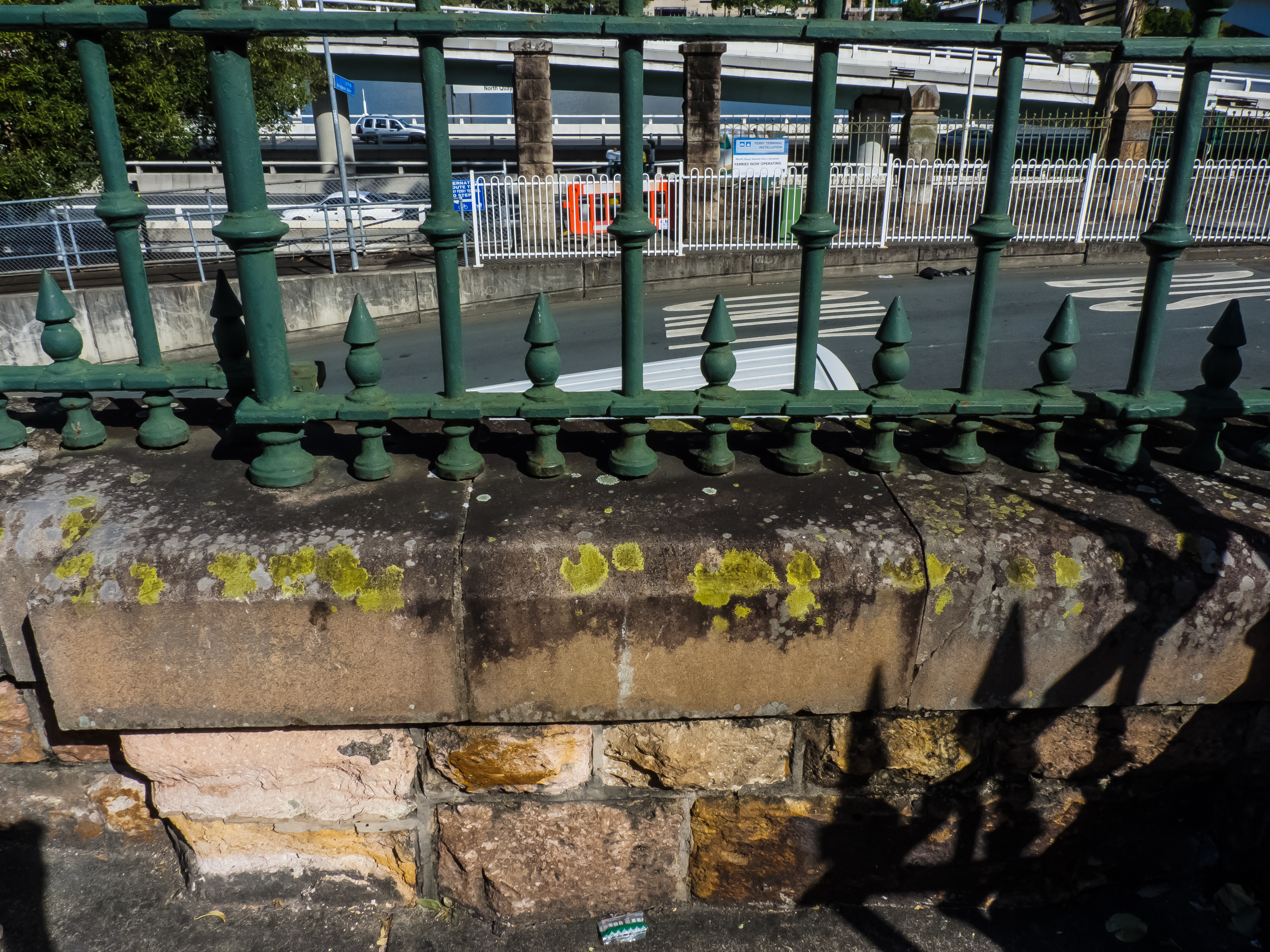

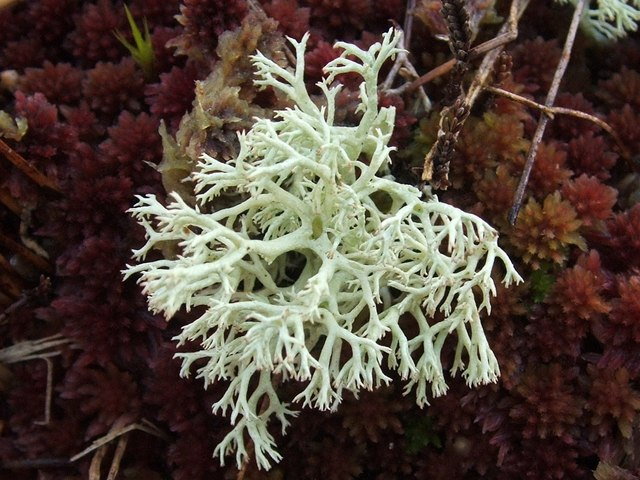

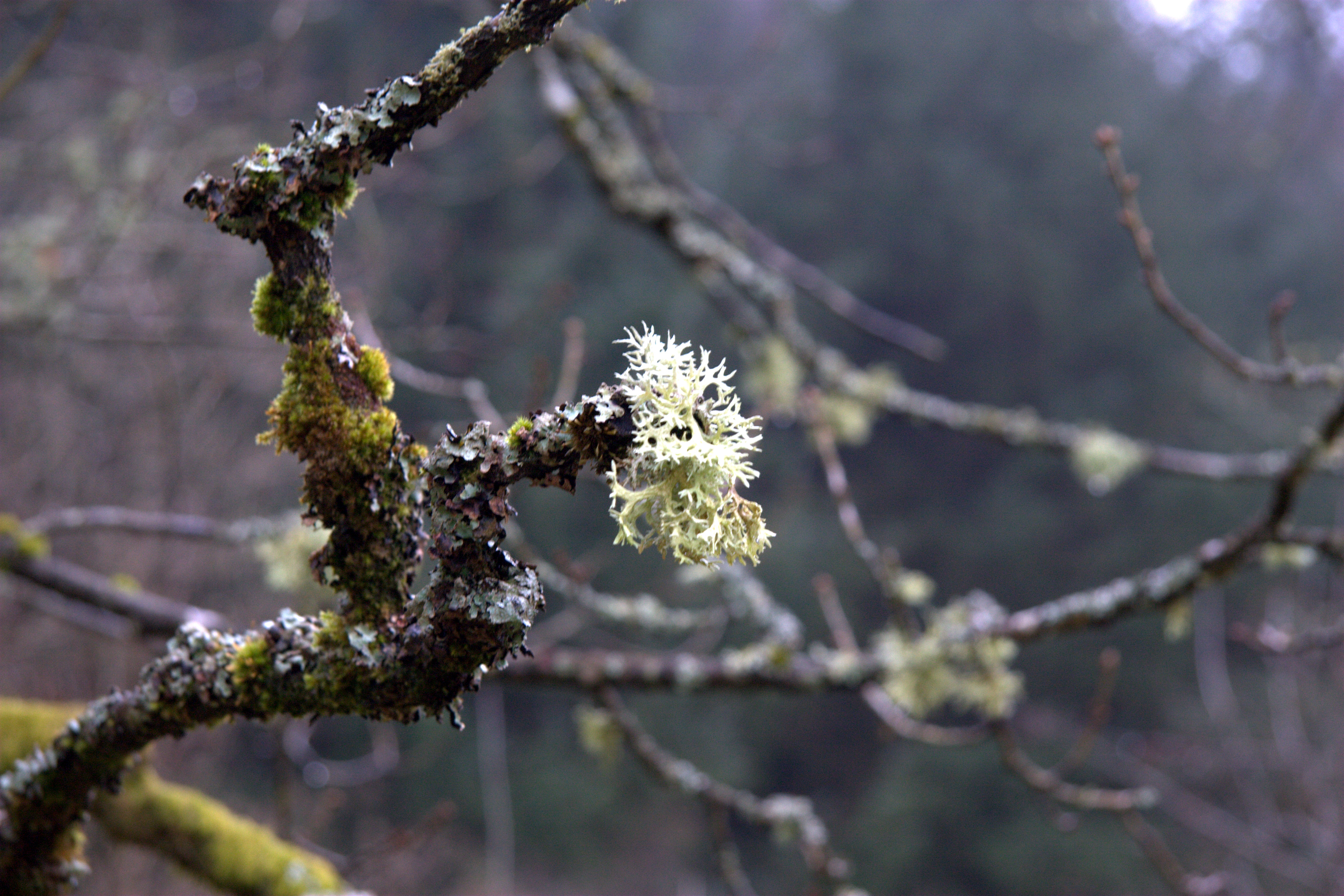

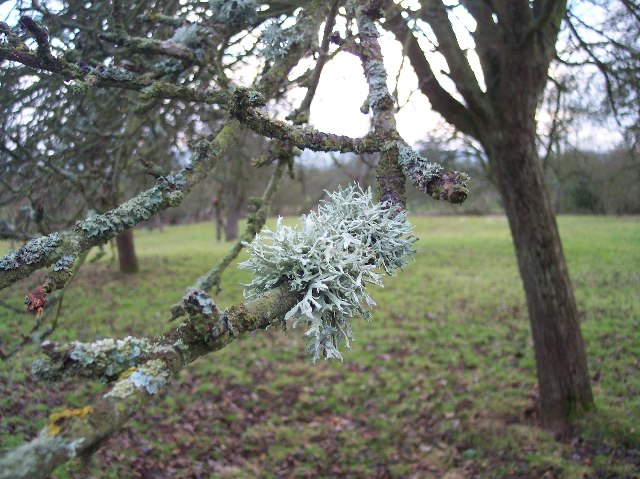

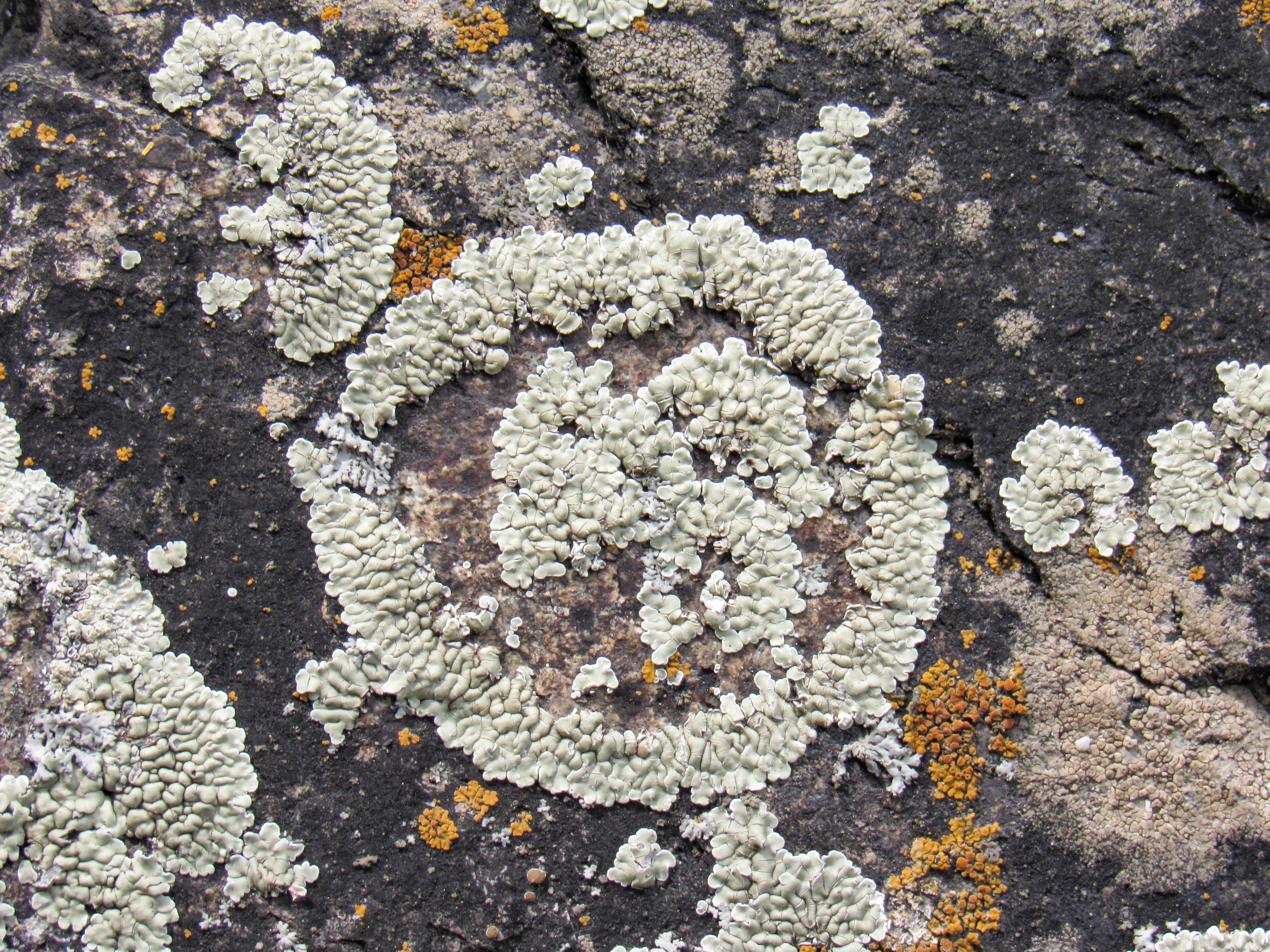

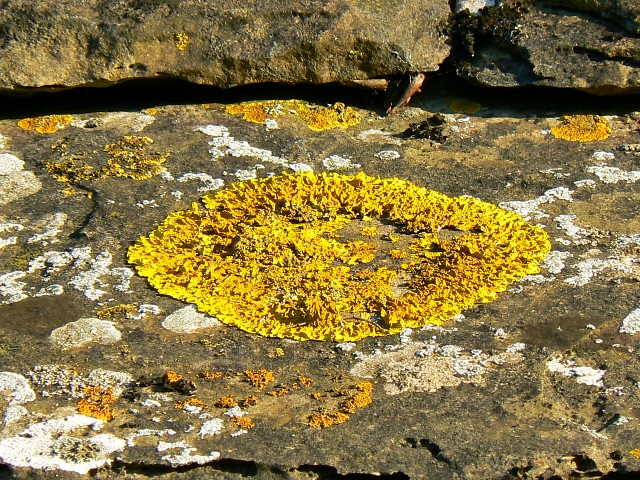

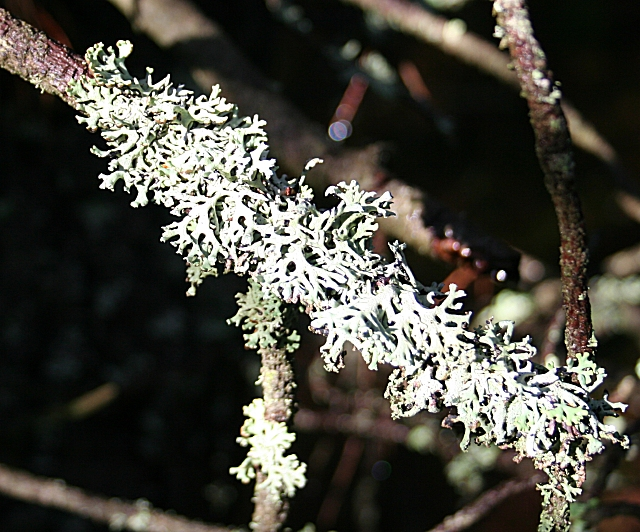

== See also ==
- International Association for Lichenology
- Lichenology
- Lichens and nitrogen cycling
- Mycophycobiosis - a symbiosis where a fungus lives in the macroscopic thallus of fresh water and marine algae; technically not a lichen but a similar phenomenon where fungi and algae are in symbiosis
