= Phytoclast =

Microscopic plant fragments in fossil

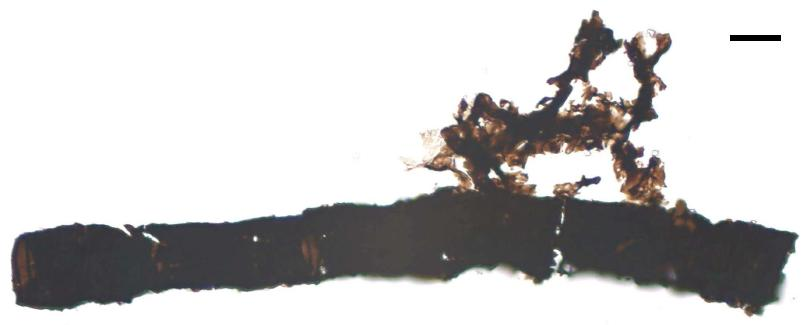
A banded tube from the late Silurian/early Devonian. The bands are difficult to see on this specimen, as an opaque carbonaceous coating conceals much of the tube. Bands are just visible in places on the left half of the image – click on the image for a larger view. Scale bar: 20 μm

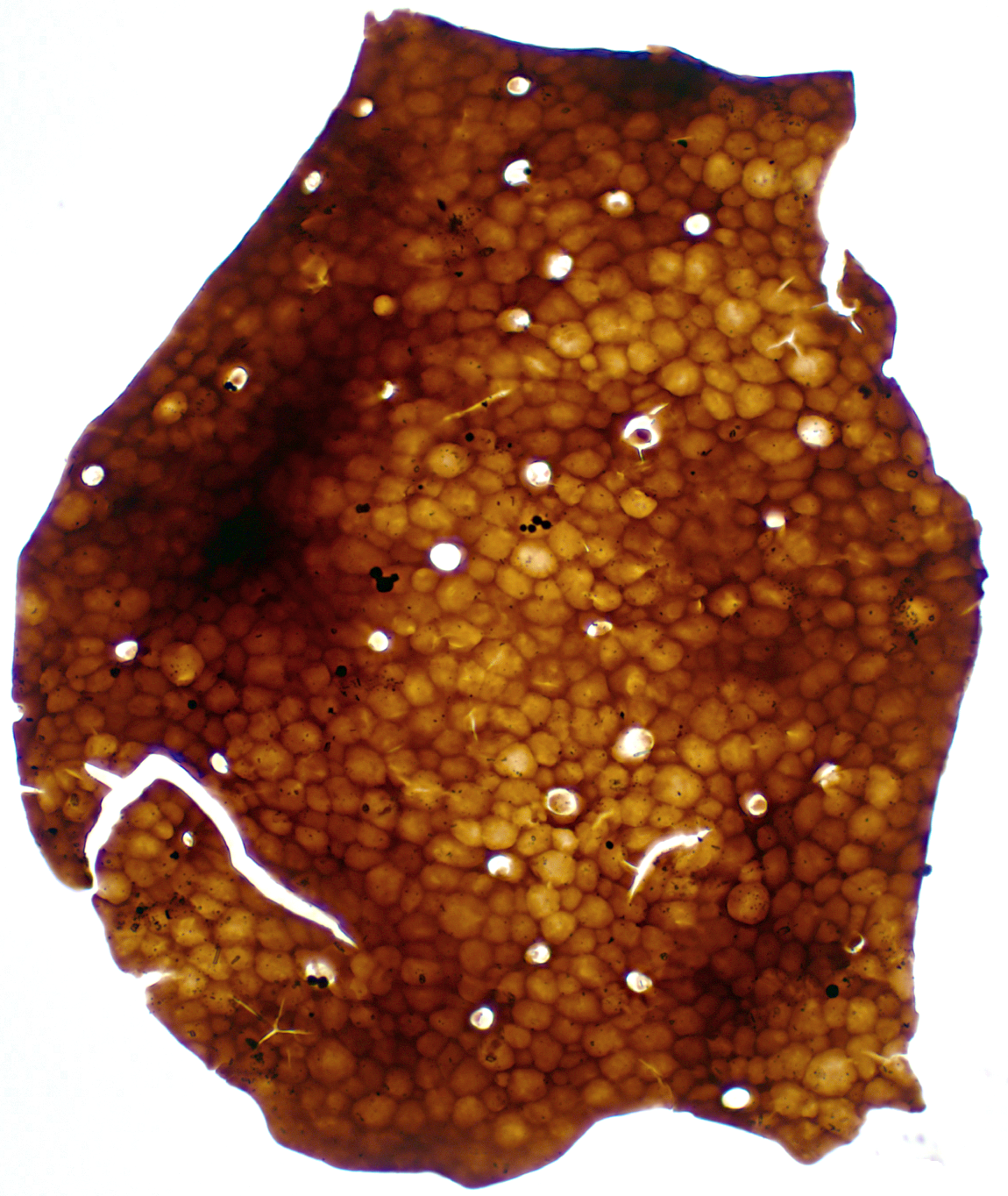
Cuticle of Cosmochlaina, retrieved from the Burgsvik beds by acid maceration. Cells about 12 μm in diameter.

Phytoclasts are microscopic plant fragments present in the fossil record, usually found in palynological preparations and acid macerations, and include banded tubes and various nematophytes.
