= Banded tube =

Type of fossil plant fragment

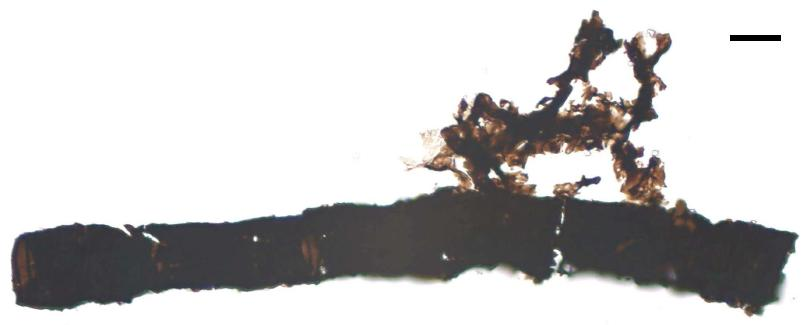
A banded tube from the late Silurian – early Devonian. The bands are difficult to see on this specimen, as an opaque carbonaceous coating conceals much of the tube. Bands are just visible in places on the left half of the image. Scale bar is 20 μm

Banded tubes are a type of phytoclast consisting of micrometre-scale tubes with a banded internal ornamentation, and known from terrestrial and freshwater settings from the Early Silurian onwards.

The bands on the walls were an early improvisation to aid the easy flow of water, and served as tracheids, although they are not equivalent in their construction. Banded tubes were lignified, giving them a more rigid structure than hydroids, allowing them to cope with higher levels of water pressure.

Banded tubes have a markedly different ultrastructure from plant tracheids, and display a wide variety of wall structures, which implies that they were produced by a variety of different organisms, or perhaps were widely variable within a single nematophyte-like organism.

Proposed functions include water transport, feeding (cf. fungal hyphae), and anchorage (cf. rhizoids).

Some banded tubes can be assigned to genera such as Nematoplexus and Nematasketum; in the case of the latter, which is probably fungal, they occur in bundles alongside other tubes.
