= Evolution of fungi =

Origin and diversification of fungi through geologic time

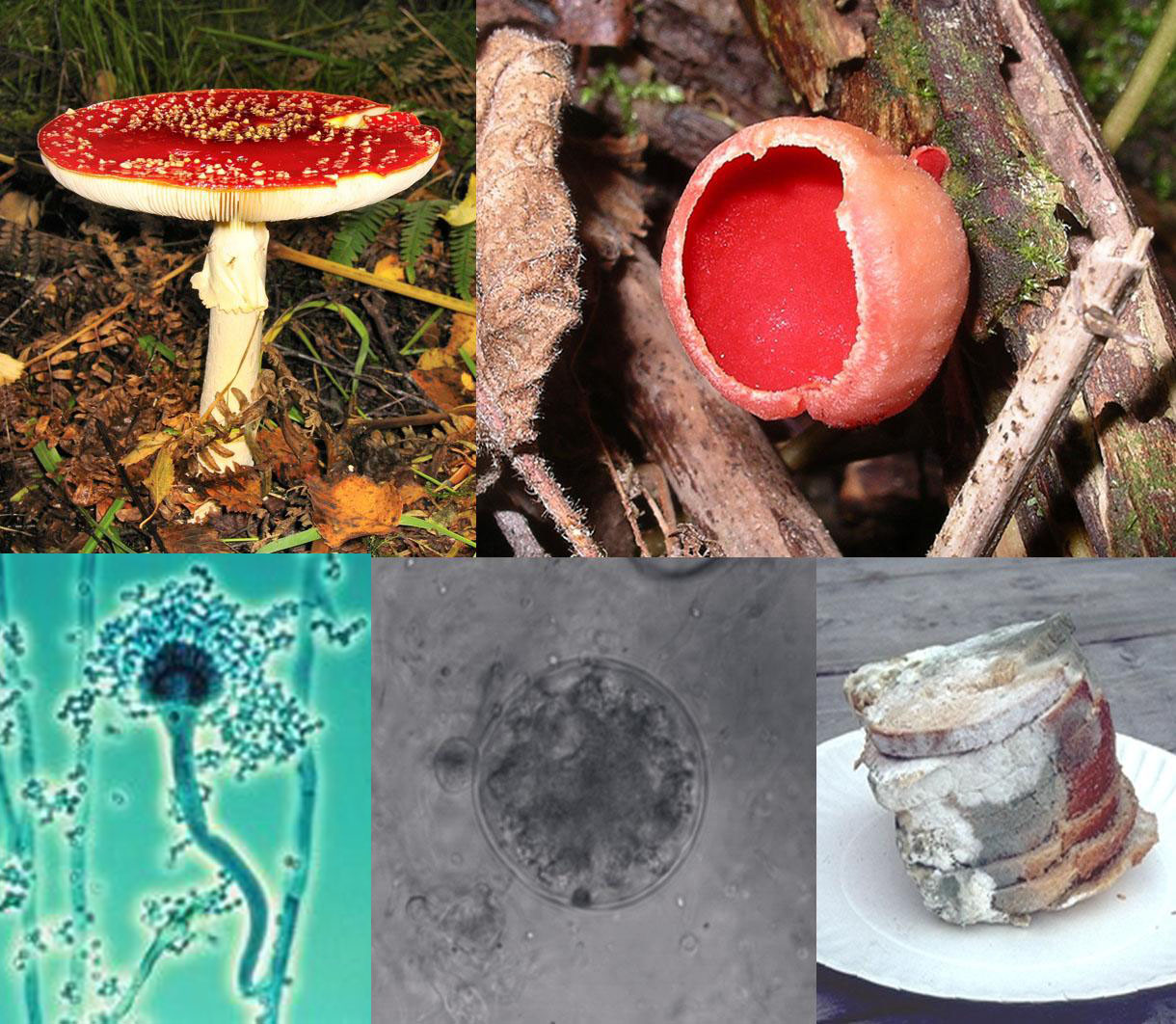
Different species of fungus. Clockwise from top left: Amanita muscaria, a basidiomycete; Sarcoscypha coccinea, an ascomycete; bread covered in mold; a chytrid; an Aspergillus conidiophore.

Fungi diverged from other life around 1.5 billion years ago, with the glomaleans branching from the "higher fungi" (dikaryans) at ~570 million years ago, according to DNA analysis. (Schüssler et al., 2001; Tehler et al., 2000) Fungi probably colonized the land during the Cambrian, over 500 million years ago, (Taylor & Osborn, 1996), and possibly 635 million years ago during the Ediacaran, but terrestrial fossils only become uncontroversial and common during the Devonian, 400 million years ago.

== Early evolution ==
Evidence from DNA analysis suggests that all fungi are descended from a most recent common ancestor that lived at least 1.2 to 1.5 billion years ago. It is probable that these earliest fungi lived in water, and had flagella.

However, a 2.4-billion-year-old basalt from the Palaeoproterozoic Ongeluk Formation in South Africa containing filamentous fossils in vesicles and fractures, that form mycelium-like structures may push back the origin of the Kingdom over one billion years before.

The earliest terrestrial fungus fossils, or at least fungus-like fossils, have been found in South China from around 635 million years ago. The researchers who reported on these fossils suggested that these fungus-like organisms may have played a role in oxygenating Earth's atmosphere in the aftermath of the Cryogenian glaciations.

About 250 million years ago fungi became abundant in many areas, based on the fossil record, and could even have been the dominant form of life on the earth at that time.

== Fossil record ==
A rich diversity of fungi is known from the lower Devonian Rhynie chert; an earlier record is absent. Since fungi do not biomineralise, they do not readily enter the fossil record; there are only three claims of early fungi. One from the Ordovician has been dismissed on the grounds that it lacks any distinctly fungal features, and is held by many to be contamination; the position of a "probable" Proterozoic fungus is still not established, and it may represent a stem group fungus. There is also a case for a fungal affinity for the enigmatic microfossil Ornatifilum. Since the fungi form a sister group to the animals, the two lineages must have diverged before the first animal lineages, which are known from fossils as early as the Ediacaran.

In contrast to plants and animals, the early fossil record of the fungi is meager. Factors that likely contribute to the under-representation of fungal species among fossils include the nature of fungal fruiting bodies, which are soft, fleshy, and easily degradable tissues and the microscopic dimensions of most fungal structures, which therefore are not readily evident. Fungal fossils are difficult to distinguish from those of other microbes, and are most easily identified when they resemble extant fungi. Often recovered from a permineralized plant or animal host, these samples are typically studied by making thin-section preparations that can be examined with light microscopy or transmission electron microscopy. Compression fossils are studied by dissolving the surrounding matrix with acid and then using light or scanning electron microscopy to examine surface details.

The earliest fossils possessing features typical of fungi date to the Paleoproterozoic era, some 2,400 million years ago (Ma); these multicellular benthic organisms had filamentous structures capable of anastomosis, in which hyphal branches recombine. Other recent studies (2009) estimate the arrival of fungal organisms at about 760–1060 Ma on the basis of comparisons of the rate of evolution in closely related groups. For much of the Paleozoic Era (542–251 Ma), the fungi appear to have been aquatic and consisted of organisms similar to the extant Chytrids in having flagellum-bearing spores. Phylogenetic analyses suggest that the flagellum was lost early in the evolutionary history of the fungi, and consequently, the majority of fungal species lack a flagellum. The evolutionary adaptation from an aquatic to a terrestrial lifestyle necessitated a diversification of ecological strategies for obtaining nutrients, including parasitism, saprobism, and the development of mutualistic relationships such as mycorrhiza and lichenization. Recent (2009) studies suggest that the ancestral ecological state of the Ascomycota was saprobism, and that independent lichenization events have occurred multiple times.

In May 2019, scientists reported the discovery of a fossilized fungus, named Ourasphaira giraldae, in the Canadian Arctic, that may have grown on land a billion years ago, well before plants were living on land. Earlier, it had been presumed that the fungi colonized the land during the Cambrian (542–488.3 Ma), also long before land plants. Fossilized hyphae and spores recovered from the Ordovician of Wisconsin (460 Ma) resemble modern-day Glomerales, and existed at a time when the land flora likely consisted of only non-vascular bryophyte-like plants; but these have been dismissed as contamination. Prototaxites, which was probably a fungus or lichen, would have been the tallest organism of the late Silurian. Fungal fossils do not become common and uncontroversial until the early Devonian (416–359.2 Ma), when they are abundant in the Rhynie chert, mostly as Zygomycota and Chytridiomycota. At about this same time, approximately 400 Ma, the Ascomycota and Basidiomycota diverged, and all modern classes of fungi were present by the Late Carboniferous (Pennsylvanian, 318.1–299 Ma).

Lichen-like fossils have been found in the Doushantuo Formation in southern China dating back to 635–551 Ma. Lichens were a component of the early terrestrial ecosystems, and the estimated age of the oldest terrestrial lichen fossil is 400 Ma; this date corresponds to the age of the oldest known sporocarp fossil, a Paleopyrenomycites species found in the Rhynie Chert. The oldest fossil with microscopic features resembling modern-day basidiomycetes is Palaeoancistrus, found permineralized with a fern from the Pennsylvanian. Rare in the fossil record are the homobasidiomycetes (a taxon roughly equivalent to the mushroom-producing species of the agaricomycetes). Two amber-preserved specimens provide evidence that the earliest known mushroom-forming fungi (the extinct species Archaeomarasmius legletti) appeared during the mid-Cretaceous, 90 Ma.

Some time after the Permian-Triassic extinction event (251.4 Ma), a fungal spike (originally thought to be an extraordinary abundance of fungal spores in sediments) formed, suggesting that fungi were the dominant life form at this time, representing nearly 100% of the available fossil record for this period. However, the proportion of fungal spores relative to spores formed by algal species is difficult to assess, the spike did not appear worldwide, and in many places it did not fall on the Permian-Triassic boundary.

Approximately 66 million years ago, immediately after the Cretaceous-Tertiary (K-T) extinction, there was a dramatic increase in evidence of fungi. Fungi appear to have had the chance to flourish due to the extinction of most plant and animal species, and the resultant fungal bloom has been described as like "a massive compost heap". The lack of K-T extinction in fungal evolution is also supported by molecular data. Phylogenetic comparative analyses of a tree consisting of 5,284 agaricomycete species do not show signal for a mass extinction event around the Cretaceous-Tertiary boundary.
