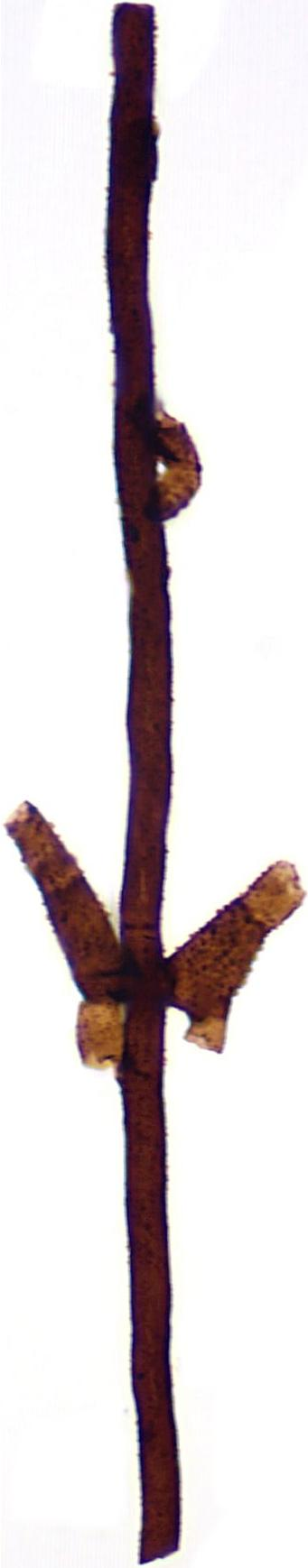
- A leading filament of T. protuberans with primary branches and nascent secondary branches. 250 μm long.
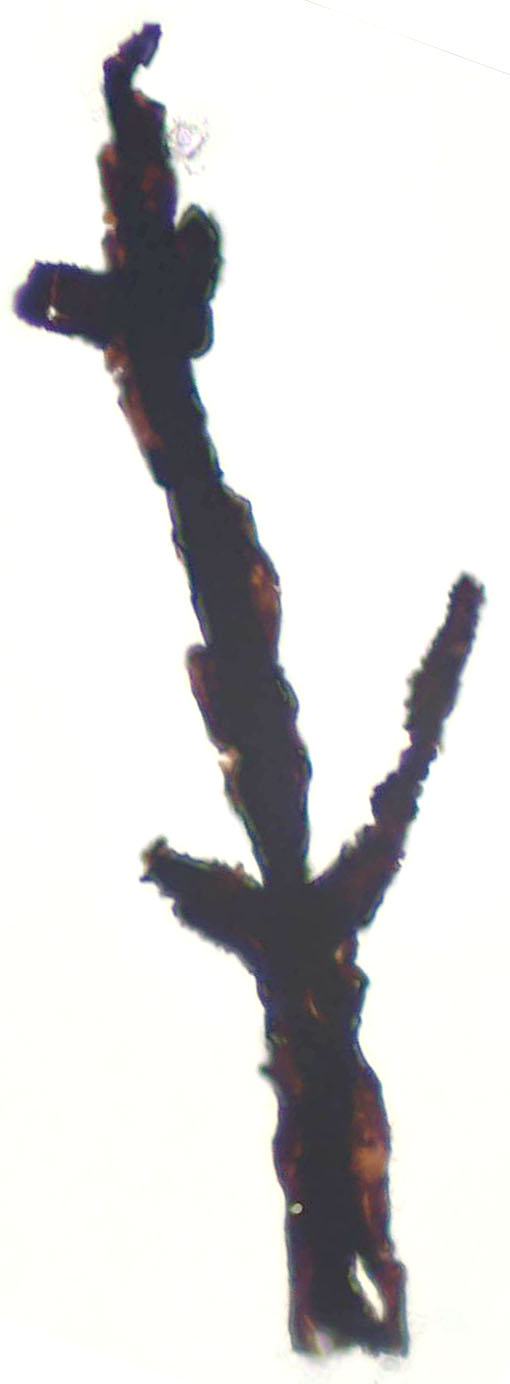
- T. protuberans from the Silurian of Kerrera, Scotland, with the main filament beginning to be covered by secondary branches and a surrounding envelope. 200 μm long.

Scientific classification
- Kingdom: Fungi
- Subkingdom: Dikarya
- Genus: Tortotubus Johnson, 1985

Species
- T. protuberans

= Tortotubus =

Tortotubus Temporal range: Hirnantian–Givetian

Extinct genus of fungi

Tortotubus is an early (Ordovician to Devonian) terrestrial fungus. Its growth trajectory can be ascertained from its fossils, which occur across the globe from the Ordovician to the Devonian. These fossils document foraging activities of slender, cell-wide exploratory hyphae; when these hit a source of food, they produced secondary branches that grew back down the original filament, covered themselves with an envelope, and served as pipes to shuttle nutrients to other parts of the organism. Today, mycelium with this growth pattern is observed in the mushroom-forming fungi.

== Background ==
The form genus Ornatifilum was erected by Burgess and Edwards in 1991 to describe tubular fossils retrieved by acid maceration from the late Silurian. It was originally intended as a form genus, to facilitate stratigraphy and environmental reconstruction; the fossils do not display enough features to classify them confidently, even at a kingdom level.

Fossils first described as Ornatifilum lornensis correspond to the foraging hyphae of Tortotubus. They are tubes of around 10 μm diameter, with an ornamented, granular surface texture. These fossils were compared to late Silurian (Ludlow epoch) fossils retrieved from the Burgsvik beds by Sherwood-Pike and Gray, and the genus was used when similar fossils were recovered from the Scottish island of Kerrera by Charles Wellman ten years later. Similar, unornamented filaments are known from the USA. They have a complex appearance: surface ornament – which covers most of the surface uniformly – takes an array of forms, with "grana, coni, spinae verrucae and occasionally plia" (Note: grana: small grains; coni: small cones; spinae verrucae: Spiny warts; plia: small streaky knobs.) present. Further, side-branches and the flask-shaped protuberances occasionally protrude from the tubes, on which the ornament is larger (2.5 μm rather than ~1 μm). Such branching typically occurs in pairs across the main thread.

Fossils originally referred to Tortotubus protuberans represent the mature cords of the fungus, composed of a braid of simple filaments that have merged into one another and formed an outer envelope with a distinctive pustular texture.

A fungal affinity is further established by the presence of punctate spores, which restricts their affinities to the red algae and fungi. The structure of the cell wall is also fungus-like.

Further circumstantial evidence may corroborate a fungal affinity: some fossils have been found in association with fungal spores, and they occur only in settings with a strong terrestrial influence.

In March 2016, scientists from the University of Cambridge found examples of Tortotubus on Gotland, Sweden and Kerrera in the Inner Hebrides, which at 440 million years-old are the oldest examples of a land-dwelling species ever found.

== Other early fungi ==
A rich diversity of fungi is known from the lower Devonian Rhynie chert, but the previous record is absent. Since fungi don't biomineralise, they do not readily enter the fossil record; aside from Ornatifilum, there are only two other claims of early fungi. One from the Ordovician has been dismissed on the grounds that it lacks any distinctly fungal features, and is held by many to be contamination; the position of a "probable" Proterozoic fungus is still not established, and it may represent a stem group fungus. If the case for Ornatifilum's fungal affinity were affirmed, that would make it the oldest known fossil fungus – although, since the fungi form a sister group to the animals, the two lineages must have diverged before the first animal lineages, which are known from fossils as early as the Ediacaran.
