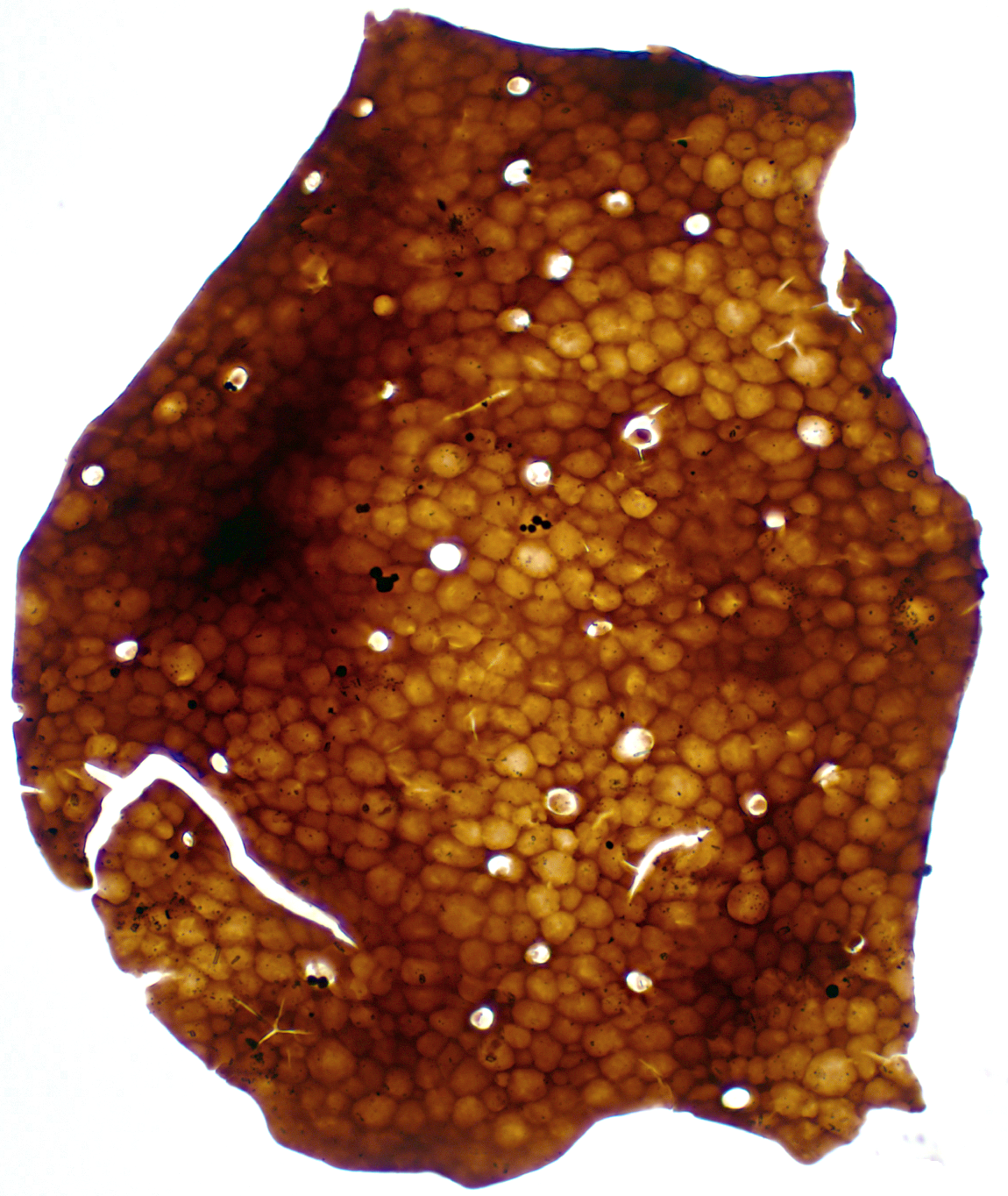
- Cuticle of Cosmochlaina, retrieved from the Burgsvik beds by acid maceration. Cells about 12 μm in diameter.

Scientific classification
- Kingdom: Plantae (?)
- Phylum: †"Nematophyta"; Lang, 1937

Families and genera
- Family Nematothallaceae: Nematothallus Lang, 1937; Cosmochlaina Edwards, 1986; Family Nematophytaceae: Nematoplexus Lyon, 1962; Nematasketum Burgess and Edwards, 1988; Prototaxites Dawson, 1859

= Nematophyta =

Nematophyta Temporal range: Upper Silurian– Famennian

Phylum of land organisms

The Nematophyta or nematophytes were a paraphyletic group of land organisms, probably including some plants as well as algae known only from the fossil record, from the Silurian period until the early Devonian Rhynie chert. The type genus Nematothallus, which typifies the group, was first described by Lang in 1937, who envisioned it being a thallose plant with tubular features and sporophytes, covered by a cuticle which preserved impressions of the underlying cells. He had found abundant disaggregated remains of all three features, none of which were connected to another, leaving his reconstruction of the phytodebris as parts of a single organism highly conjectural. No reproductive or vegetative structures common to the land plants are known, and certain members of the nematophyte plexus (including Nemataplexus, axial conjugations of banded and branching tubes) seem to belong to the fungi.

The lack of a clear definition of the nematophytes has led to it being used as a wastebasket taxon, with all manner of tubes and cell-patterned cuticles from around the Silurian being dubbed "nematophytic" more as a statement of ignorance than as a scientifically meaningful statement.

Nematophytes, including cuticle and banded tubes, have been found in coprolites that were apparently produced by millipedes.
