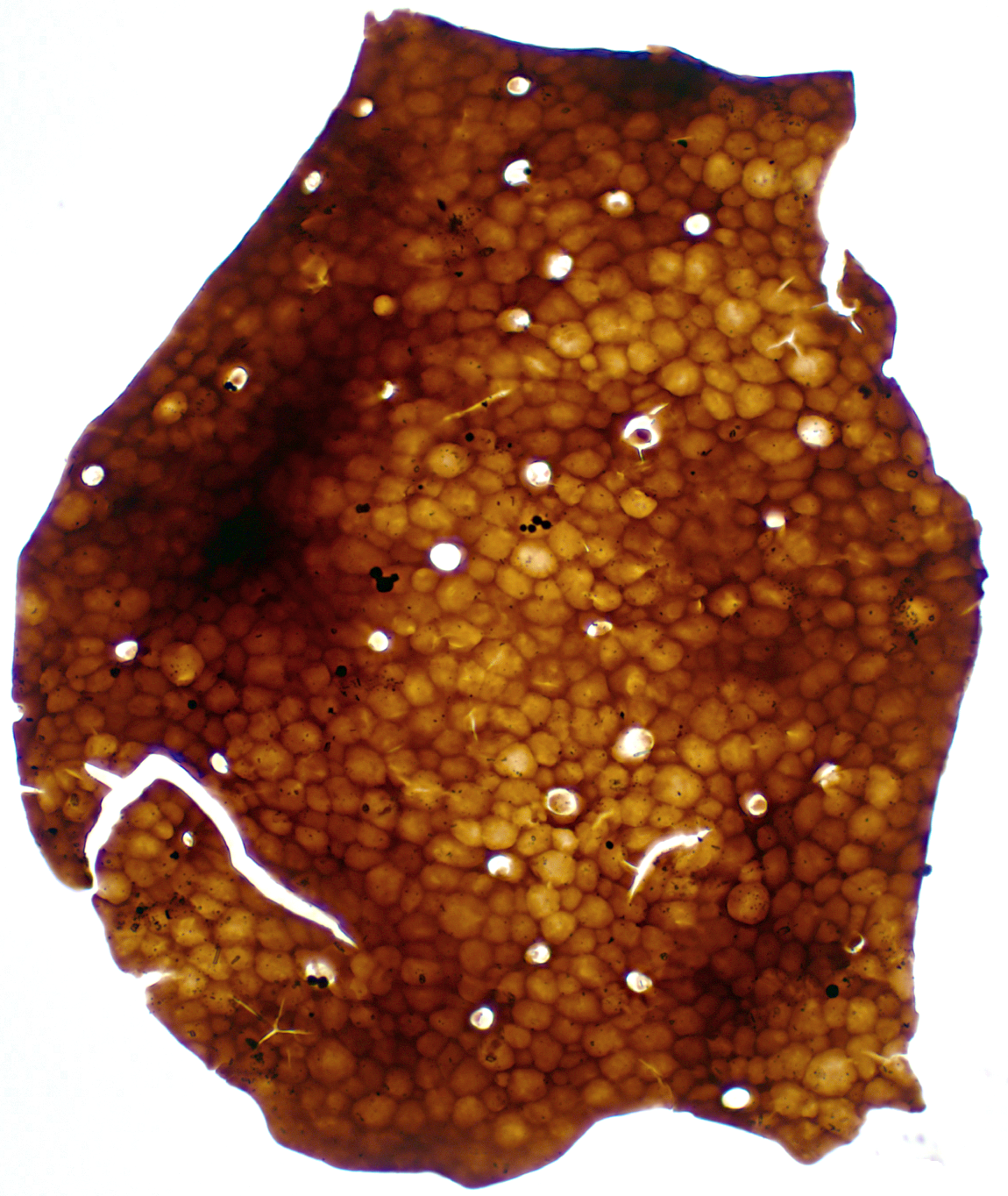
- Cuticle of Cosmochlaina, retrieved from the Burgsvik beds by acid maceration. Cells about 12 μm in diameter.

Scientific classification
- Kingdom: Plantae (?)
- Phylum: †"Nematophyta"
- Class: †Nematophytina
- Order: †Nematophytales
- Family: †Nematothalaceae; Strother 1993
- Genus: †Cosmochlaina; Edwards 1986

Species
- C. verruculosus; (May be a typo, in Taylor 1988): C. verrucosa (Type); C. maculata; C. physema; C. Versiformis; (All defined by Edwards 1986)

= Cosmochlaina =

Cosmochlaina Temporal range: Late Silurian–Early Devonian

Extinct genus of Devonian plants

Cosmochlaina (from Greek: kosmos=ornament; xlaina=wrapper/cloak) is a form genus of nematophyte – an early (Silurian – Devonian) plant known only from fossil cuticles, often found in association with tubular structures. The form genus was put forwards by Dianne Edwards, and is diagnosed by inwards-pointing flanges and randomly oriented pseudo-cellular units. Projections on the outer surface are always present, and sometimes also appear on the inner surface; however, the surface of the cuticle itself is always smooth. The holes in the cuticle are often covered by round flaps, loosely attached along a side.

Where Nematothallus was sometimes used to relate only to tube-like structures, Cosmochlaina was used in reference to the cuticle fragments. Material discovered later revealed its internal anatomy, which comprises a lichen-like mat of 'hyphae'.

It has been suggested that the pores of Cosmochlaina represent broken-off rhizoids, on the basis that rotting and acid treatment of extant liverworts produces a similar perforated texture. However, the status of this form genus in any one kingdom is not secure; members could, for example, represent arthropod cuticle. Alternatively, different species may in fact represent different parts of the same organism. Based on the more recent material, a lichen affinity seems most plausible.

== See also ==
- Nematothallus, a closely related sister taxon
- Evolutionary history of plants
