= Seal Cove =

Seal Cove may refer to:

- Battle of Seal Cove, a minor naval action west of Lively Island during the 1982 Falklands war
- Seal Cove (Conception Bay South), Newfoundland and Labrador, Canada
- Seal Cove (Fortune Bay), Newfoundland and Labrador, Canada
- Seal Cove (White Bay), Newfoundland and Labrador, Canada
- Seal Cove River, Quebec, Canada
- Seal Cove Elementary School, a public elementary school in Prince Rupert, British Columbia
- Seal Cove, Maine, a village on Mount Desert Island off the coast of the U.S. state of Maine
- Prince Rupert/Seal Cove Water Aerodrome, Canada
