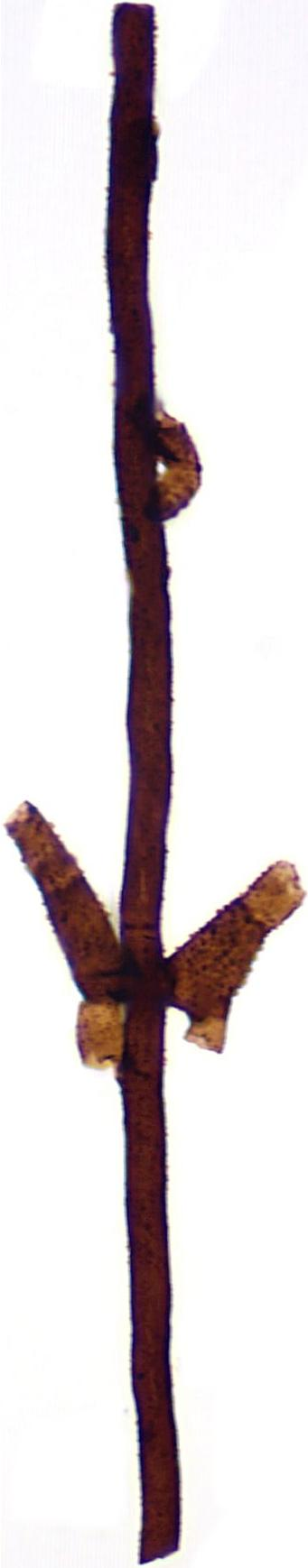
- Tortotubus closely resembles Ornatifilum. 250 μm long.
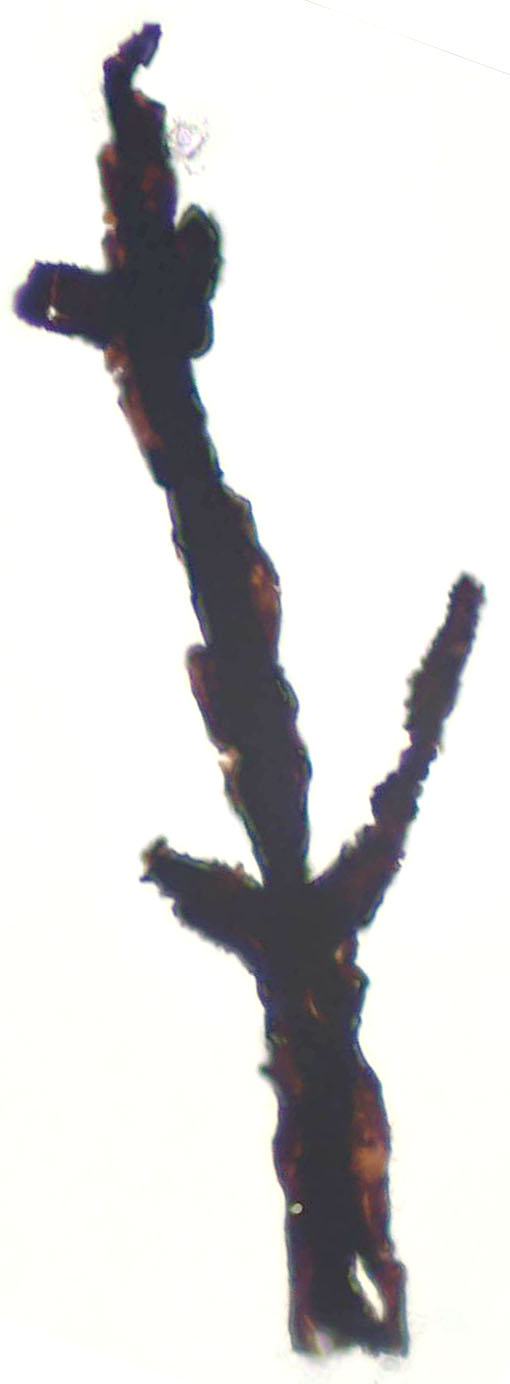
- T. protuberans from the Silurian of Kerrera, Scotland. 200 μm long.

Scientific classification
- Genus: Ornatifilum Burgess & Edwards 1991

Species
- O. granulatum Burgess & Edwards, 1991 (type)

= Ornatifilum =

Ornatifilum Temporal range: Late Silurian (Wenlock) – Early Devonian (Lochkovian)

Extinct genus of fungi

Ornatifilum (Latin ornatus + filum, Ornamented filament) is an artificial form genus, which is used to categorise any small, branched filaments with external ornamentation.

It has been applied to microfossils of Devonian age with fungal affinities, though these taxa have since been recognized as an early growth form of Tortotubus.

== Background ==
The form genus Ornatifilum was erected by Burgess and Edwards in 1991 to describe tubular fossils retrieved by acid maceration from the late Silurian. It was originally intended as a form genus, to facilitate stratigraphy and environmental reconstruction; the fossils do not display enough features to classify them confidently, even at a kingdom level.

The organisms comprise tubes of around 10 μm diameter, with an ornamented, granular surface texture. These fossils were compared to late Silurian (Ludlow epoch) fossils retrieved from the Burgsvik beds by Sherwood-Pike and Gray, and the genus was used when similar fossils were recovered from the Scottish island of Kerrera by Charles Wellman ten years later. Similar, unornamented filaments are known from the USA. However, these latter fossils have now been assigned to Tortotubus.

== Ornatifilum granulatum ==
The type species of the genus consists of flattened filaments – perhaps an artefact resulting from post-burial pressure. Their branching is typically at obtuse angles; the irregularly sized grana, which ornament their surfaces, are concentrated at branching points. They are often found as individuals, but sometimes group together into "wefts", as Wellman has termed them. The filaments are septate, with the septa looking like "pinch points" where the tube is slightly constricted – like a twisted balloon. No sign of perforation was visible in the septa; perforate spores are only found in red algae and fungi, but their absence does not preclude their presence in one of these groups: indeed the perforations are difficult to see or image. There are no other diagnostic features of this species that allow classification in any group. Surface ornamentation is a common convergent feature, found for example in liverwort rhizoids and some fungi, so does not help in classification. The specimens recovered are most common in near-shore environments; however, they are never abundant.

== Ornatifilum lornensis ==
Ornatifilum lornensis is a junior synonym of Tortotubus protuberans. It has a more complex appearance than O. granatum. For a start, its surface ornament – which covers most of the surface uniformly – takes an array of forms, with "grana, coni, spinae verrucae and occasionally plia" (Note: grana: small grains; coni: small cones; spinae verrucae: Spiny warts; plia: small streaky knobs.) present. Further, side-branches and the flask-shaped protuberances occasionally protrude from the tubes, on which the ornament is larger (2.5 μm rather than ~1 μm). Such branching typically occurs in pairs across the main thread.

== Timeline ==
Ediacaran
Cambrian
Ordovician
Silurian
Devonian
Carboniferous
Permian
Triassic
Jurassic
Cretaceous
Paleogene
Neogene
Quaternary
│
−600
│
−550
│
−500
│
−450
│
−400
│
−350
│
−300
│
−250
│
−200
│
−150
│
−100
│
−50
│
0
Million years ago
