= Geology of Gotland =

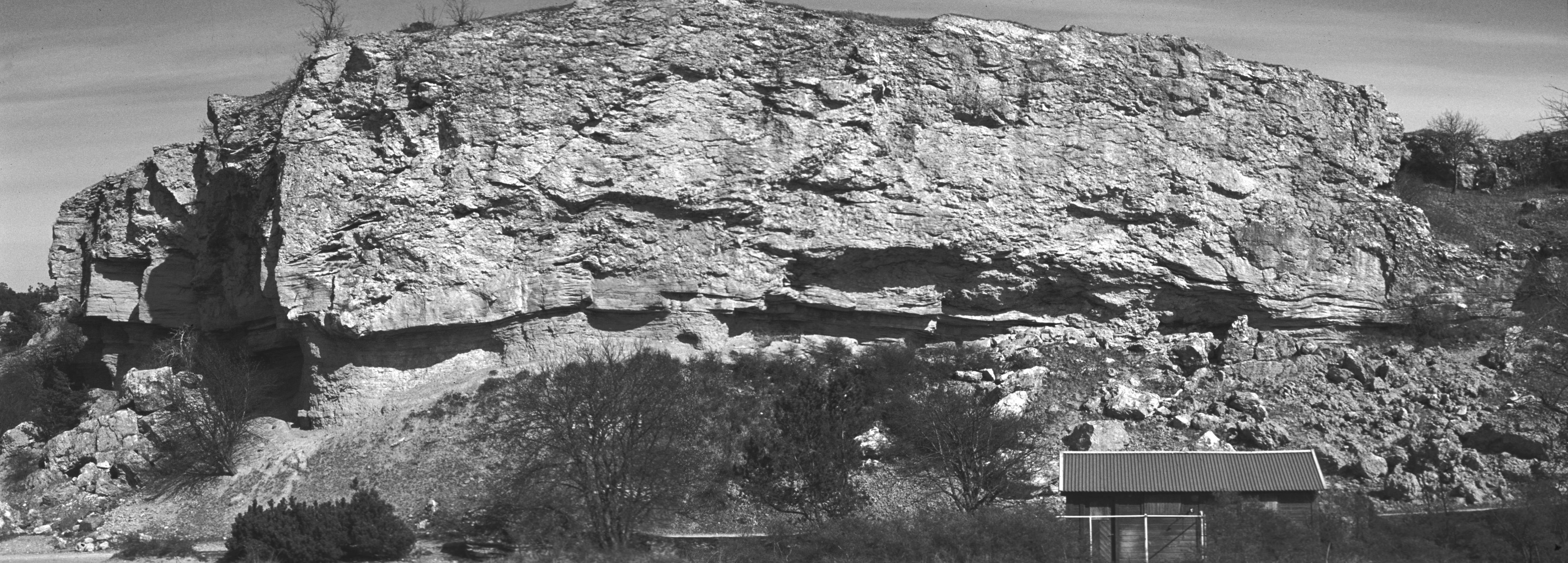
A Silurian reef complex in Gotland. The reef belongs to the Sundre formation, and overlies the Hamra.

The geology of Gotland is made up of a sequence of sedimentary rocks of a Silurian age, dipping to the south-east. Gotland is the largest island of Sweden, and is located in the Baltic Sea. The main Silurian succession of limestones and shales comprises thirteen units spanning 200–500 m (660–1,640 ft) of stratigraphic thickness, being thickest in the south, and overlies a 75–125 m (246–410 ft) thick Ordovician sequence. Precambrian shield rocks that underlie these sediments are found 400 to 500 meters sea level. Sedimentary rocks cropping out in Gotland were deposited in a shallow, hot and salty sea, on the edge of an equatorial continent. The water depth never exceeded 175–200 m (574–656 ft), and shallowed over time as bioherm detritus, and terrestrial sediments, filled the basin. Reef growth started in the Llandovery, when the sea was 50–100 m (160–330 ft) deep, and reefs continued to dominate the sedimentary record. Some sandstones are present in the youngest rocks towards the south of the island, which represent sand bars deposited very close to the shore line.

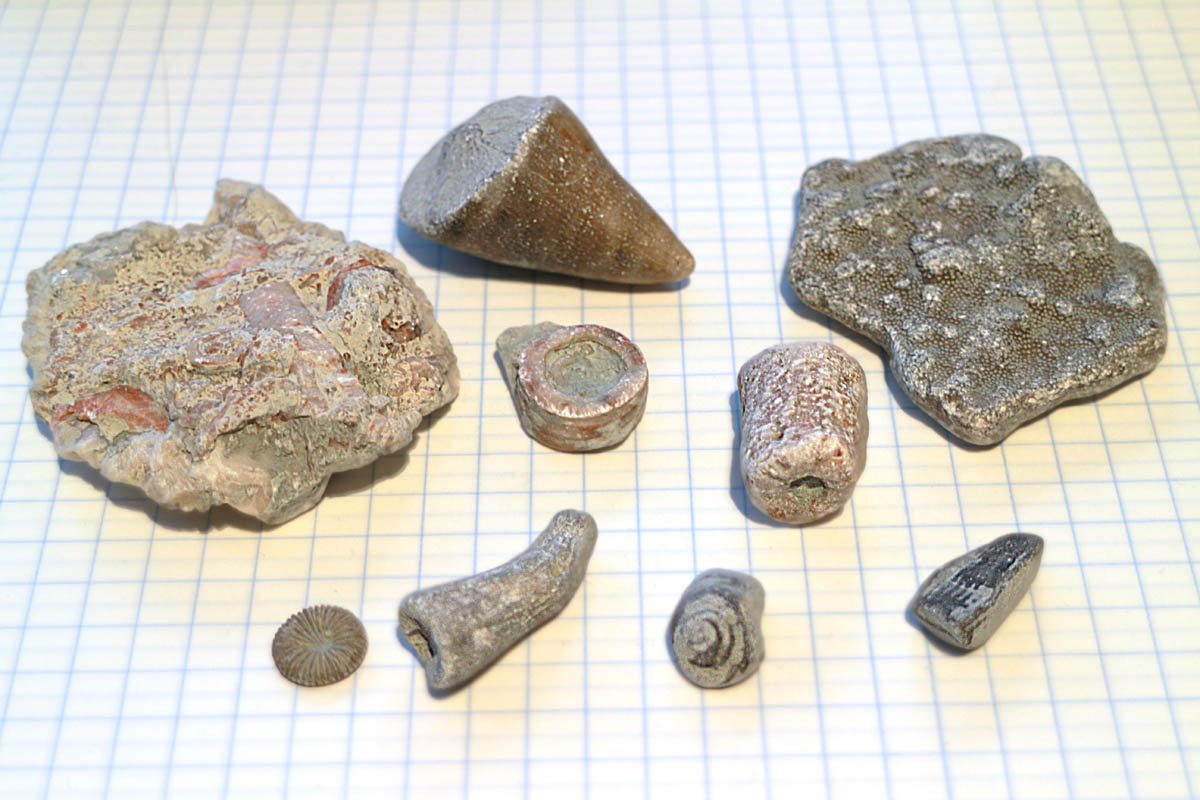
Fossils from Gotland beaches (placed on notebook paper with 7 mm (0.28 in) squares).

The lime rocks have been weathered into characteristic karstic rock formations known as rauks. Fossils, mainly of rugose corals and brachiopods, are abundant throughout the island; palæo-sea-stacks are preserved in places.

The rocks of Gotland display signals of global extinction events, which take their name from parishes on the island: the Ireviken, Mulde and Lau events.

== Stratigraphy ==
Geological map of Gotland. The Burgsvik beds are highlighted in blue.

The earlier Paleozoic of the island comprises the following formations, listed from youngest to oldest (i.e. from south to north).

Ludlow

- Sundre Formation
- Hamra Formation
- Burgsvik Formation – terrestrial input; deposited during regression
- Eke Formation
- Hemse Formation

Wenlock

- Klinteberg Formation
- Halla-Mulde Formation
- Fröjel Formation – terrestrial input; deposited during regression and topped with erosional sequence boundary.
- Slite Group
- Hangvar Formation
- Tofta Formation
- Högklint Formation
- Upper Visby Formation

Llandovery

- Lower Visby Formation

== Quaternary geology ==
Ancylus Lake around 8 700 years BP. The relic of Scandinavian Glacier in white. Note that most of Gotland was submerged at this stage.

Gotland has mostly a subdued relief composed of flat erosion surfaces. Higher areas usually correspond to those of more-less pure limestone while lower areas have commonly a geology of marl. The reason for this is that limestone is more resistant to erosion than marl. Another general relief feature is that northwestern margin of the island is higher than the southeastern parts. This higher northwestern coast is in part result of the southeast tilt of the sedimentary strata. The northwest coast is straight and contain active cliffs. On the other side the eastern coastline is irregular and sinuous.

During large Quaternary glaciations Gotland was covered by an ice sheet. The effects of Quaternary glacial erosion are not as visible in Gotland as they are in mainland Sweden because of its sedimentary basement. Glaciation did however left thin blankets of fine-grained boulder-clay till. The boulder include rocks of Archean age transported from far-away regions of Fennoscandia. Where the till blanket is absent the bare rock surfaces are exposed.

At the end of the last glaciation Gotland was fully summerged in the waters of the proto-Baltic Sea. The Ancylus and Litorina transgressions left marks in form of beaches. These beaches are now located above current sea level due to post-glacial rebound and changes in sea level. Compared to the rest of Sweden Gotland host good examples of active coastal processes.

There are few traces of river and stream erosion in Gotland. Some drainage in the island occurs through karstic systems, including caves. The soils of Gotland are thin with calcareous till clay being the main parent material.

== Economic geology ==
The particular geology of Gotland has conditioned many aspects of human life and economic activity. The economic activities influenced by geology include forestry, farming, cement production and quarrying building stones.

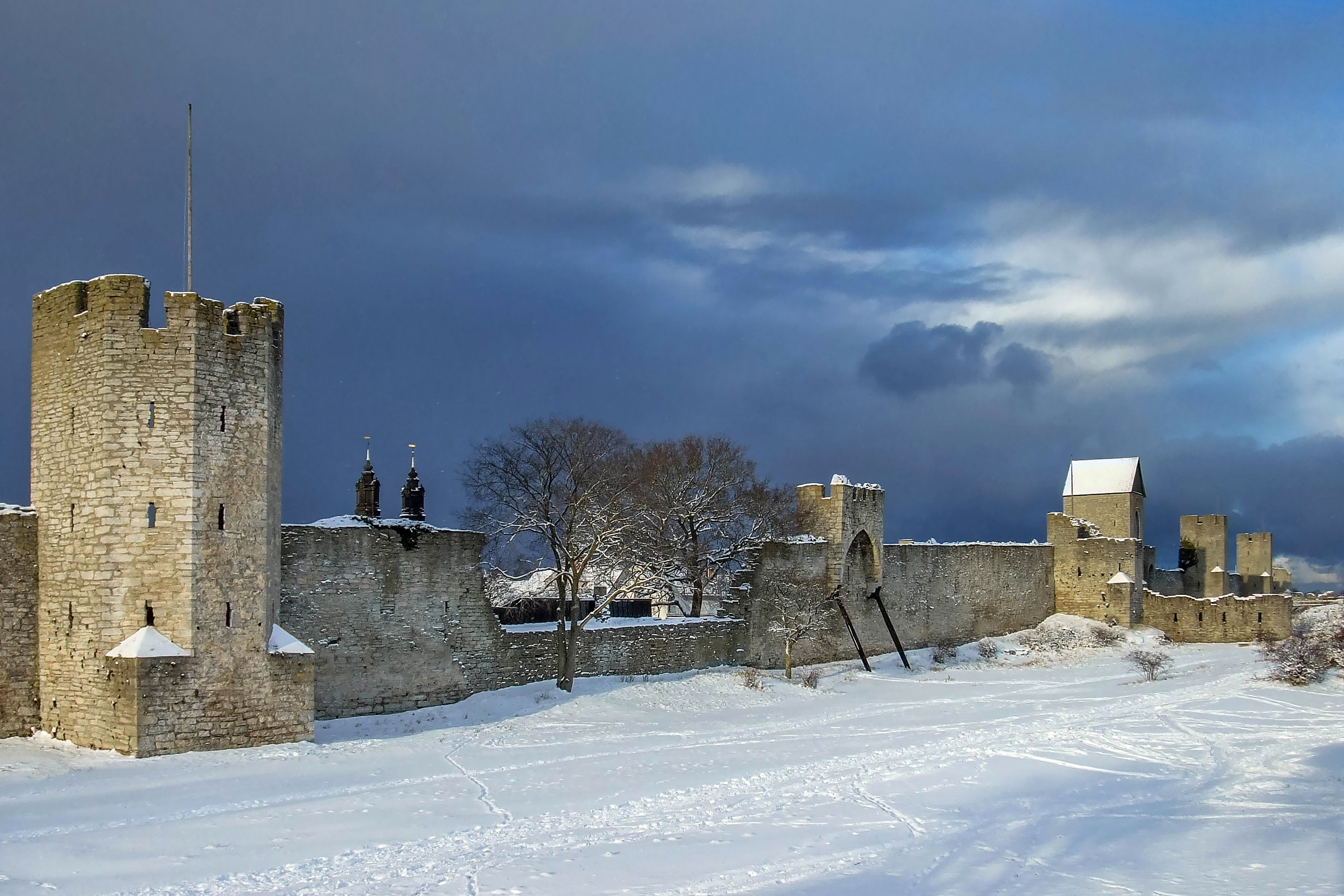
View of the city wall of Visby built from local limestone.

During the industrial age demand for Gotland limestone came from pulp mills, sugar refineries and iron works. People working in the quarries of Gotland have diminished from about 600 in the mid-1930s to 350 by 2010. The intended opening of a new limestone quarry in the 2010s in northern Gotland has led to a substantial conflict between environmentalists and those who support the project. In April 2015, the legal process regarding the allowance of the project was put on hold by Swedish courts until the Swedish government takes a decision or, if not, until August 31 of 2015. On September 1, 2016, previous permission to expand quarrying was revoked by Swedish courts citing the recent expansion of a nearby Natura 2000 conservation area.

Exploratory wells have revealed the existence of petroleum oil of Lower Paleozoic age beneath Gotland.

== See also ==
- Geology of the Baltic Sea
- Geology of Sweden
