= Nematoplexus =

Scientific classification
- Kingdom: Plantae (?)
- Phylum: "Nematophyta"
- Class: †Nematophytina
- Order: †Nematophytales
- Family: †Nematothalaceae
- Genus: †Nematoplexus; Lyon 1962

Fossil taxon

Nematoplexus rhyniensis is a fossil known from the Rhynie chert assigned to the nematophytes. It comprises a loose mass of coily aseptate tubes. Tubes which may have originated from a Nematoplexus-like plant are known from earlier Silurian sediments.
