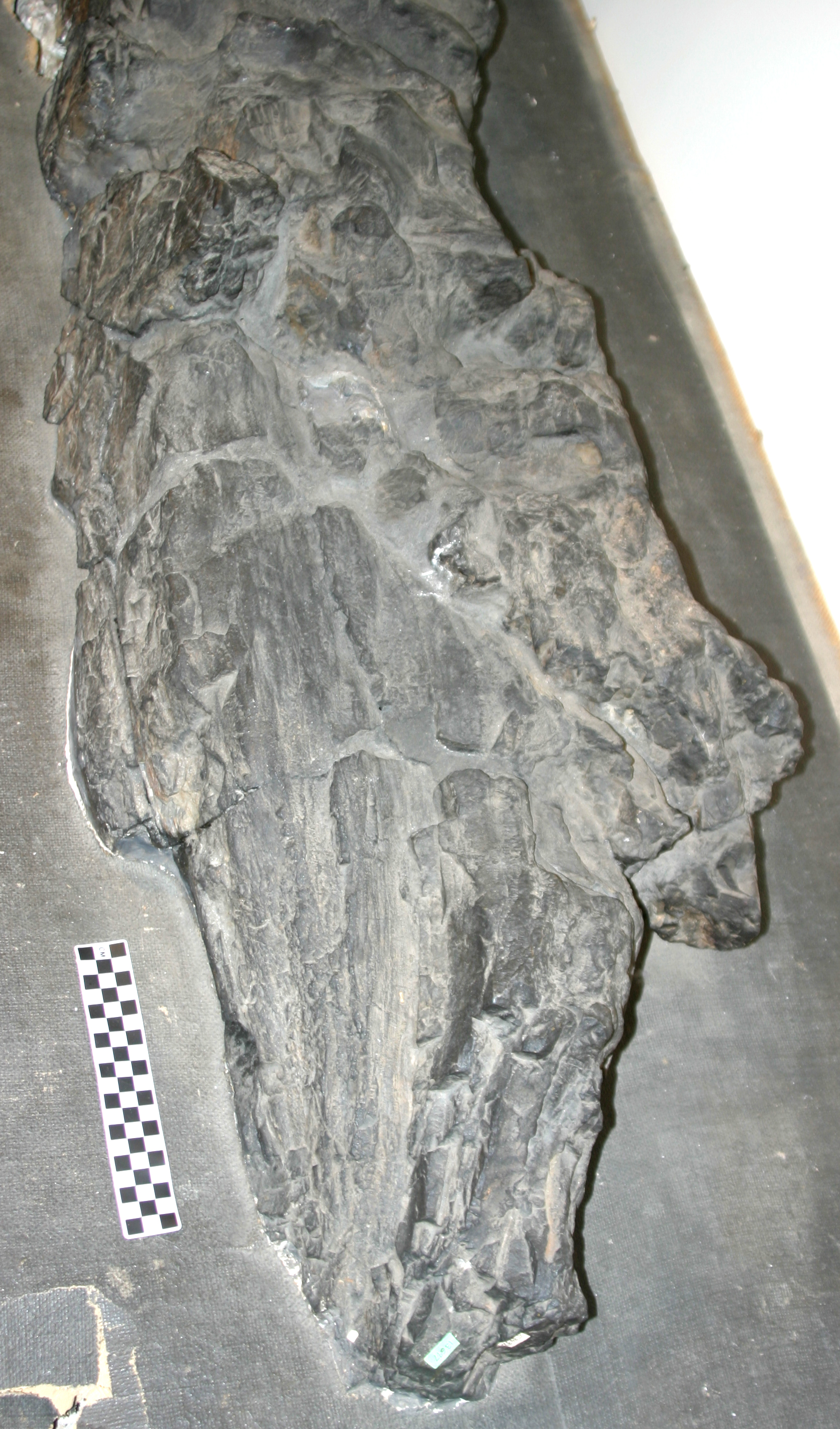
- Branching apex of P. loganii, "Schunnemunk tree"

Scientific classification
- Domain: Eukaryota
- (unranked): incertae sedis
- Family: †Prototaxitaceae; Hueber
- Genus: †Prototaxites; Dawson, 1859

Type species
- Prototaxites loganii Dawson, 1859

Species
- P. caledonicus (Lang, 1926) Schmidt & Teichmüller, 1954; P. clevelandensis Chitaley, 1992; P. forfarensis (Kidston, 1897) Pia; P. hicksii (Etheridge, 1881) Pia; P. honeggeri? Retallack, 2019; P. loganii Dawson, 1859; P. ortoni (Penhallow, 1896) Pia; P. psygmophylloides Kräusel & Weyland, 1930 ex Kräusel & Weyland, 1931; P. saharianum (Chiarugi, 1934) Kräusel & Weyland; P. southworthii Arnold, 1952; P. storriei (Barber, 1892) Pia; P. taiti (Kidston & Lang, 1921) Pia

Synonyms
- Celluloxylon Dawson, 1881; Germanophyton Høeg, 1942; Nematophycus Carruthers, 1872; Nematophyton Dawson, 1888; Nematoxylon Dawson, 1863

= Prototaxites =

Prototaxites Temporal range: Late Silurian–Late Devonian, 420–370 Ma

Extinct genus of indeterminate eukaryote

Prototaxites is an extinct genus of large macroscopic eukaryote dating from the Late Silurian until the Late Devonian periods. Prototaxites formed large trunk-like structures up to 1 metre (3 ft) wide, reaching 8 metres (26 ft) in height, made up of tiny interwoven tubules around 50 micrometres (0.0020 in) in diameter, making it by far the largest land-dwelling organism of its time.

The taxonomy of Prototaxites has long been the subject of debate. It is widely considered a fungus, but the debate is ongoing. Its relationship with extant fungus lineages is uncertain. It was almost certainly a perennial heterotroph that grew over multiple years. Several ecologies have been proposed, including that it was saprotrophic like many modern fungi, or that it was a lichenised autotroph. The most recent study of isotopic data from Prototaxites fossils from Scotland's Rhynie chert suggest it was saprotrophic but likely not related to fungi due to structural and chemical differences.

== Morphology ==
With a diameter of up to 1 metre (3 ft 3 in), and a height reaching 8.8 metres (29 ft), Prototaxites fossils are remnants of by far the largest organism discovered from the period of its existence. Viewed from afar, the fossils take the form of tree trunks, spreading slightly near their base in a fashion that suggests a connection to unpreserved root-like structures. Infilled casts which may represent the spaces formerly occupied by "roots" of Prototaxites are common in early Devonian strata. Concentric growth rings, sometimes containing embedded plant material, suggest that the organism grew sporadically by the addition of external layers. It is possible that the preserved trunk-like structures represent the fruiting body, or sporophore, of a fungus, which would have been fuelled by a mycelium, a net of dispersed filaments (hyphae). On a microscopic scale, the fossils consist of narrow tube-like structures, which weave around one another. These come in two types: skeletal tubes, 20–50 micrometres (μm) across, have thick (2–6 μm) walls and are undivided for their length, and generative filaments, which are thinner (5–10 μm in diameter) and branch frequently; these mesh together to form the organism's matrix. These thinner filaments are septate – that is, they bear internal walls. These septa are perforate, containing a germ pore, a trait present only in the modern red algae and fungi.

The similarity of these tubes to structures in the early plant Nematothallus has led to suggestions that the latter may represent leaves of Prototaxites. However, the two have never been found in connection, although this may be a consequence of their detachment after the organisms' death.

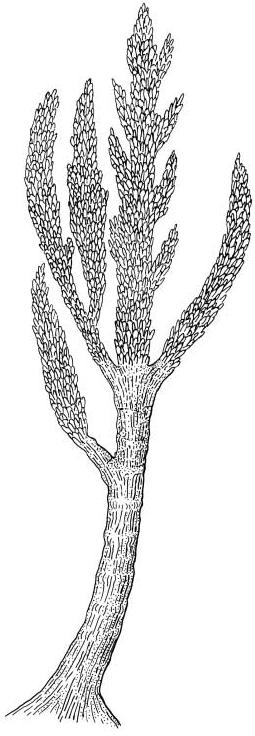
Dawson's 1888 reconstruction of a conifer-like Prototaxites

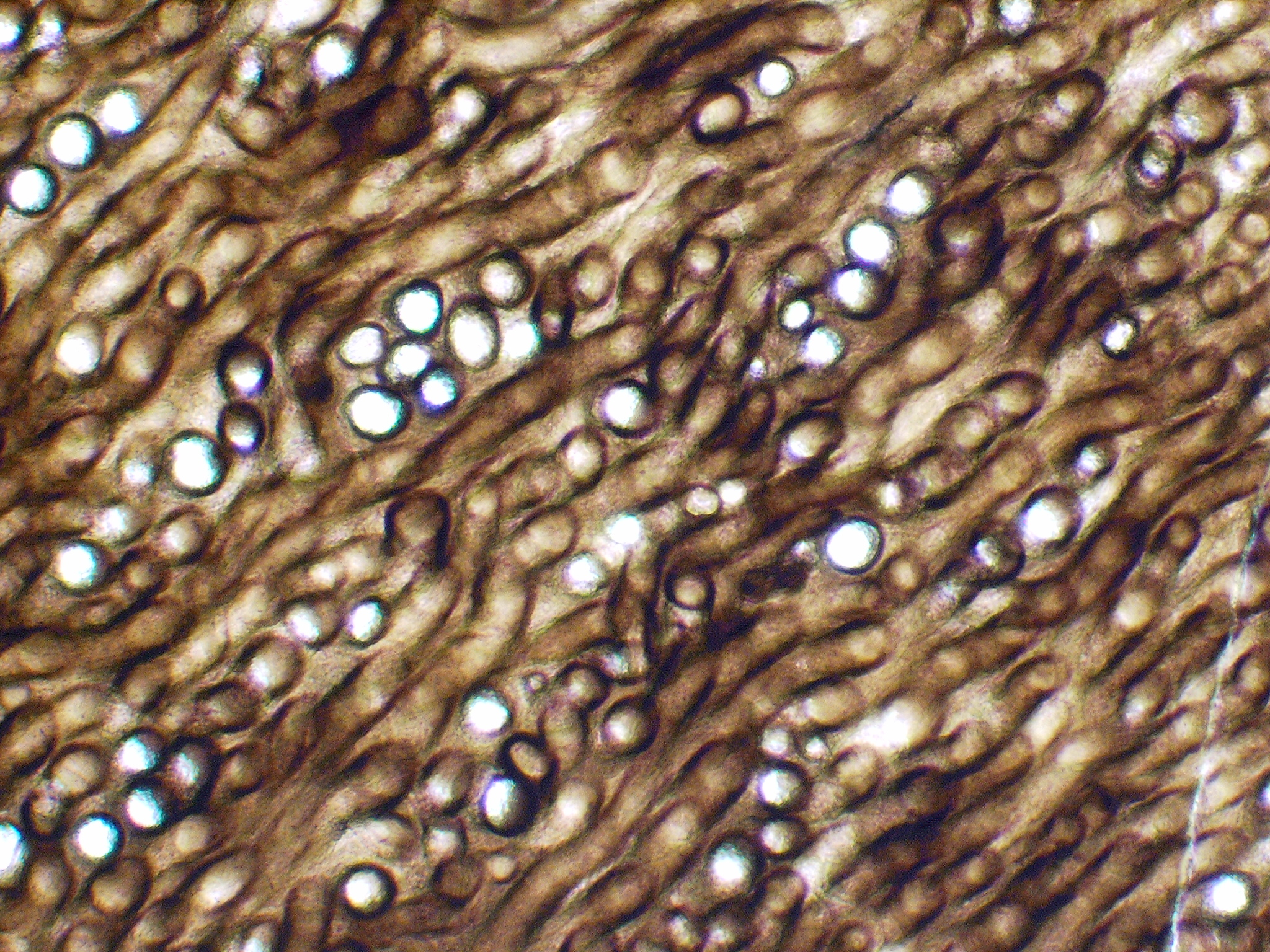
The microstructure of Prototaxites under a light microscope

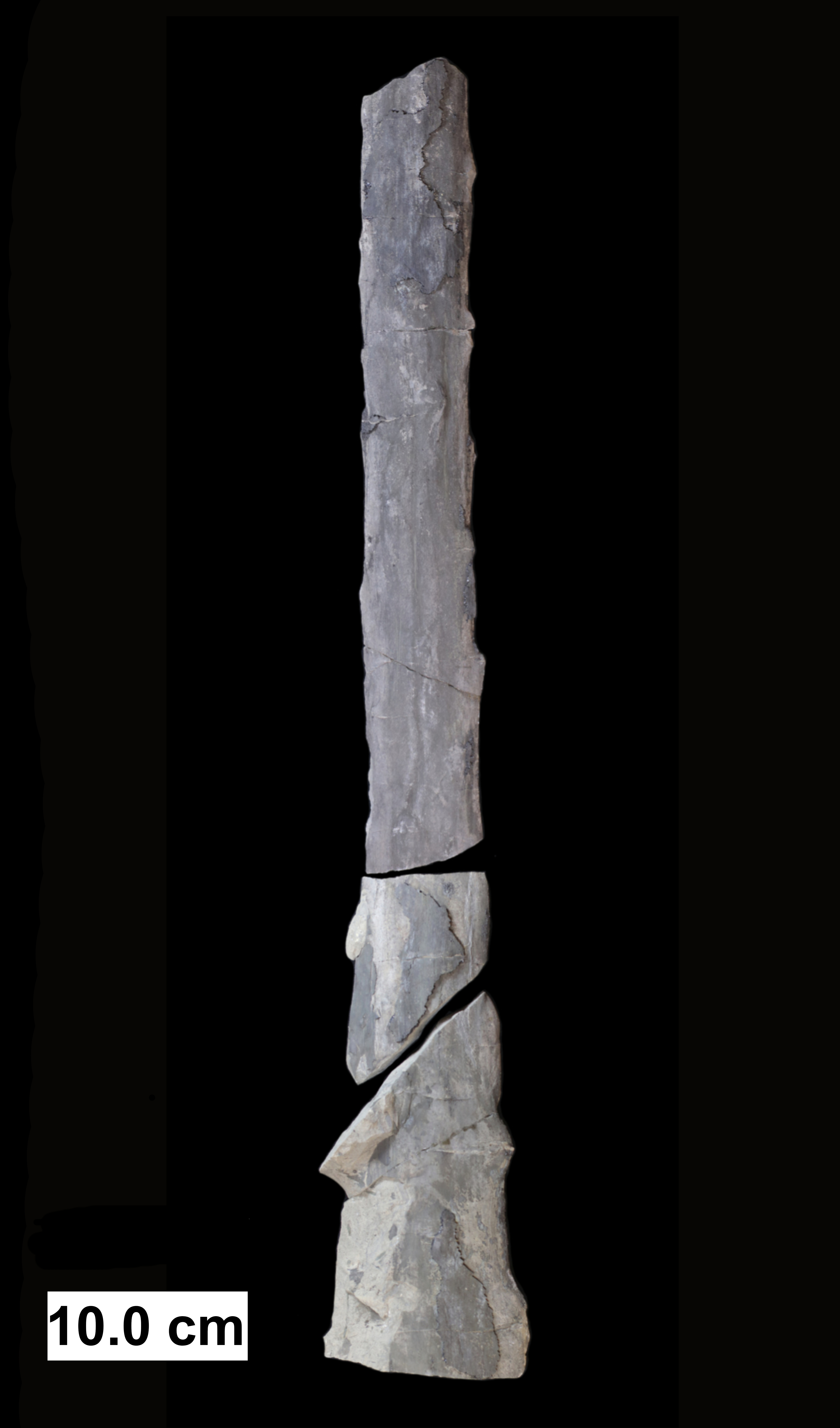
P. milwaukeensis from Wisconsin

== History of research ==
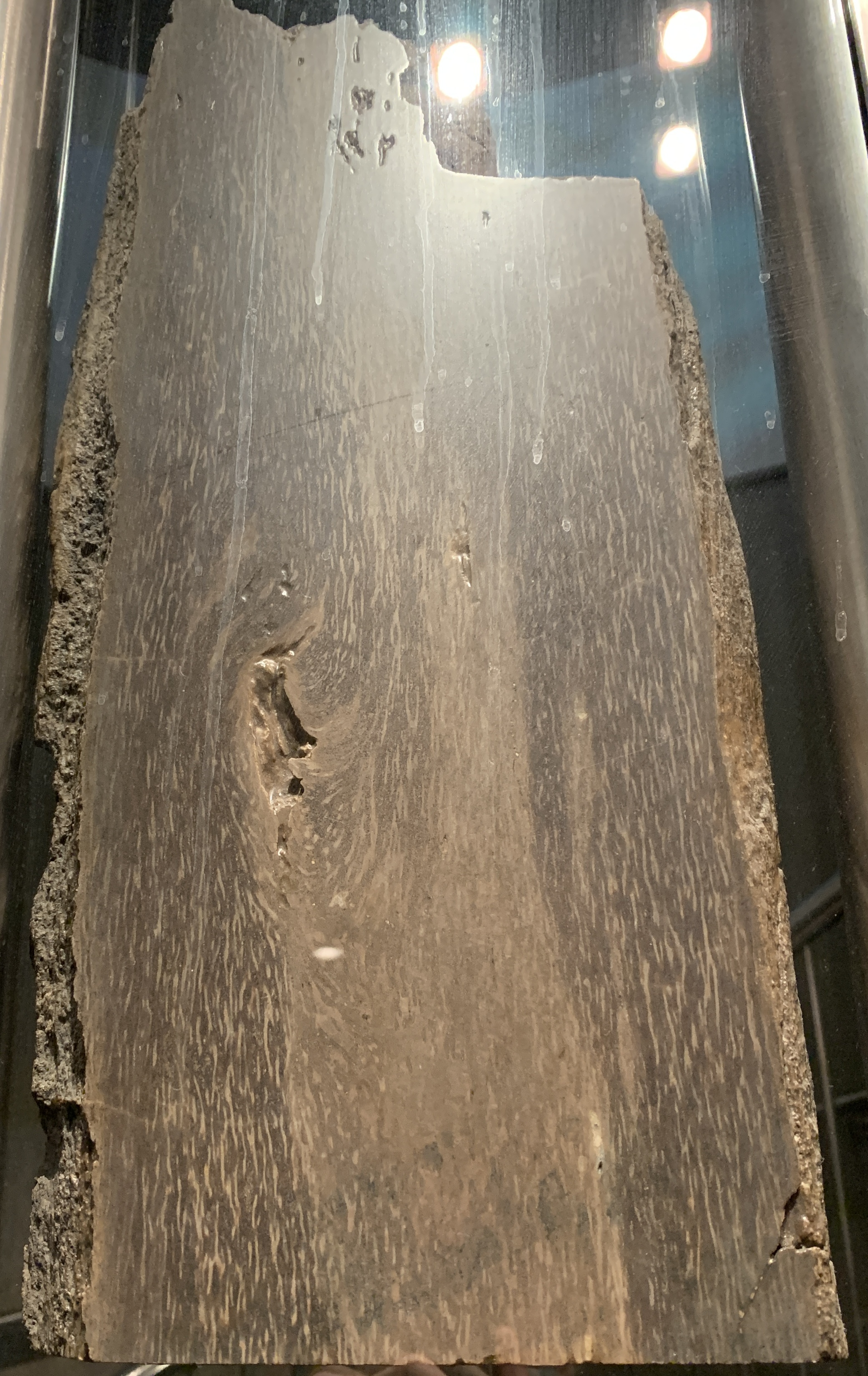
A polished section of Prototaxites sp. at the Royal Tyrrell Museum of Palaeontology

In 1843, (Note: A fossil specimen collected by Charles Darwin's friend, Joseph Hooker, was mislaid for 163 years at the British Geological Survey offices in London.) Canadian geologist Sir William Edmond Logan discovered a fossil—a “trunk” more than 2 metres (6 ft 7 in) long and 91 centimetres (36 in), wide—in Devonian-era strata at Seal Cove in the Gaspé Peninsula in Quebec. He brought the fossil back to Montreal. It was not until 14 years later that fellow Canadian geologist John William Dawson studied Prototaxites fossils, which he described as partially rotten giant conifers, containing the remains of the fungi which had been decomposing them. This concept was not disputed until 1872, when rival scientist and British paleobotanist William Carruthers ridiculed the idea. Carruthers faulted the name Prototaxites (loosely translated as "first yew" (Note: The "Taxinaea" (Taxaceae) are a group among conifers to which Dawson drew analogy.)) and insisted that the name Nematophycus ("stringy alga") be adopted, a move strongly against scientific convention. Dawson fought adamantly to defend his original interpretation until studies of the microstructure made it clear that his position was untenable, whence he promptly attempted to rename the genus himself, calling it Nematophyton ("stringy plant"), and denying with great vehemence that he had ever considered it to be a tree. Despite these attempts to rename the genus, the rules of botanical nomenclature mean that the name "Prototaxites", however inappropriate in meaning, remains in use today.

Despite the overwhelming evidence that the organism grew on land, Carruthers' interpretation that it was a giant marine alga was challenged only when, in 1919, A.H. Church suggested that Carruthers had been too quick to rule out the possibility that it was a fungus. The lack of characters diagnostic of any extant group made the presentation of a firm hypothesis difficult; the fossil remained an enigmatic mystery and subject of debate. It was not until 2001, after 20 years of research, that Francis Hueber, of the National Museum of Natural History in Washington, D.C., published a long-awaited paper that attempted to place Prototaxites taxonomically. The paper deduced, based on its morphology, that Prototaxites was a fungus.

This idea was received with disbelief, denial, and strong skepticism, but further evidence has emerged to support it. In 2007, isotopic analyses by a team including Hueber and K.C. Boyce of the University of Chicago concluded that Prototaxites was a giant fungus. They detected a highly variable range of values of carbon isotope ratios in a range of Prototaxites specimens. Autotrophs (organisms such as plants and algae that sustain themselves via photosynthesis) living at the same time draw on the same (i.e., atmospheric) source of carbon; as organisms of the same type share the same chemical machinery, they reflect this atmospheric composition with a constant carbon isotope trace. The inconsistent ratio observed in Prototaxites appears to show that the organism did not have a solely photosynthetic metabolism, and Boyce's team deduced that the organism fed on a range of substrates, such as the remains of nearby organisms. Nevertheless, the large size of the organism is hypothesised to necessitate an extensive network of subterranean mycelia in order to obtain enough organic carbon to accumulate the necessary biomass. Root-like structures have circumstantially been interpreted as Prototaxites rhizomorphs, and could support the possibility of the organism transporting nutrients large distances to support its above-ground body.

Other research has suggested that Prototaxites represents a rolled-up bundle of liverworts, but this interpretation has substantial difficulties. A similar genus, Nematasketum, also consists of banded and branching tubes in axial bundles and has been described as a fungus.

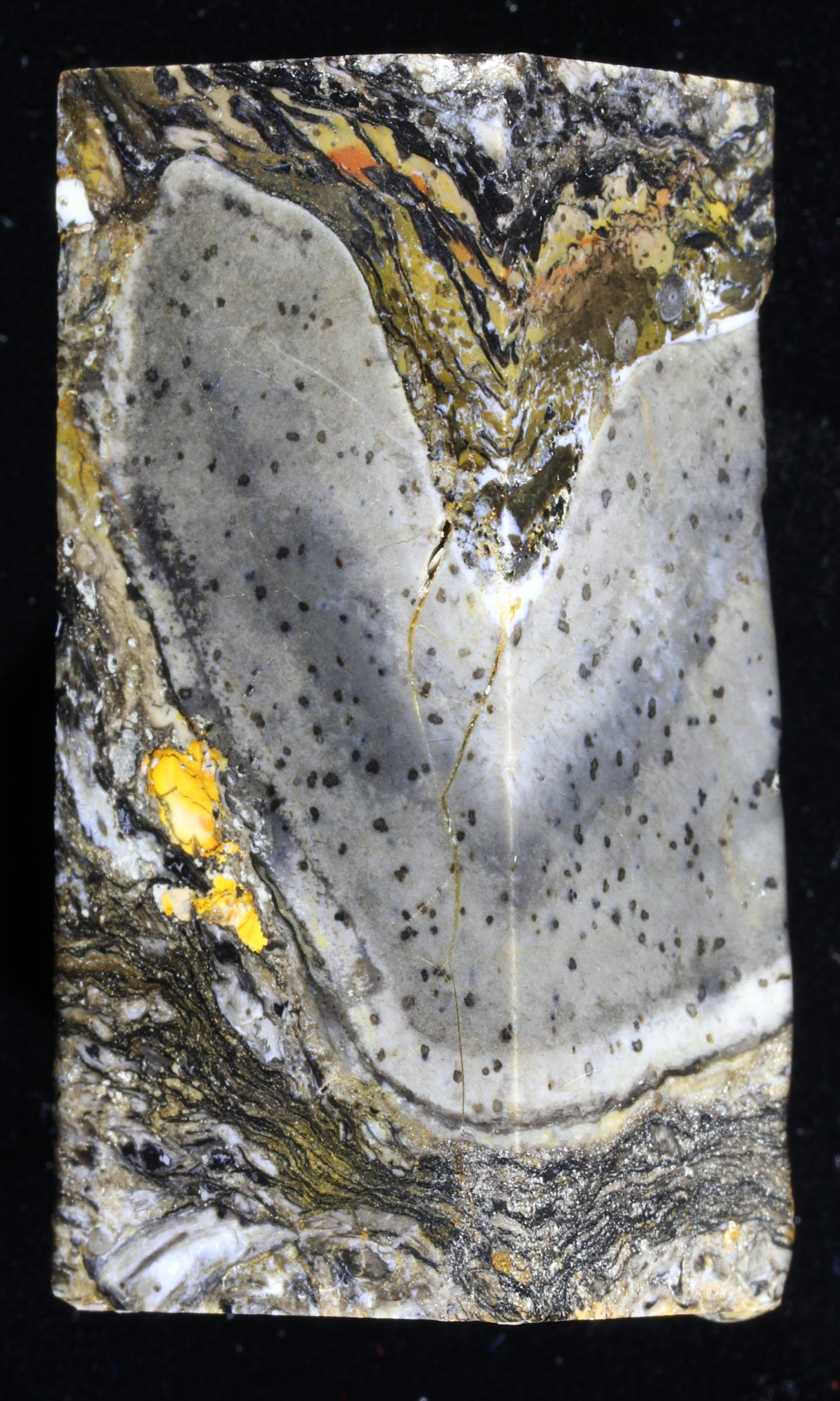
A specimen of P. taitii from the Rhynie chert

In 2019, Gregory Retallack described the new species Prototaxites honeggeri from the Darriwilian stage of the Middle Ordovician Douglas Lake Member of the Lenoir Limestone, at Douglas Dam, Tennessee, which marks the earliest known appearance of the genus Prototaxites. While an Ordovician origin of the genus is mentioned by some studies, paleobotanist D. Edwards commented with reference to Retallack's study that "When diagnostic features are absent, such fragmentary organic materials can be misinterpreted, leading to implausible attributions". Nelsen & Boyce (2022), referring to Retallack's study, maintained that the first appearance of the genus was in the Late Silurian.

A 2022 paper suggested that Prototaxites was a fungal rhizomorph that grew on its side and likely at least partially underground, as opposed to the traditional view that it grew upright. This reconstruction proposes this rhizomorph functioned to transport and distribute water and nutrients across the landscape.

A 2026 paper found that the chemical composition of Prototaxites fossils from the Rhynie chert assemblage in Scotland is distinct from that of other organisms in the same environment – including fungi – due to lacking chitin, a key structural element in extant fungi. The paper additionally found that the medullary spots of Prototaxites taiti are composed of highly dense fine branching, and identified that some tubes have internal banding. The authors suggest that both of these features are distinct from anything found in extant fungi, and may be involved in physiological functions like gas exchange and water transport that extant fungi do not have. The authors propose that Prototaxites represents a completely new extinct lineage, separate from plants, fungi and other eukaryotes. However, a recent comment to this article pointed out severe methodological errors in the analysis of the spectroscopic data which seems to invalidate these taxonomic considerations.

== Ecological context ==
The University of Chicago research team has reconstructed Prototaxites as a branchless, columnar structure. It was the tallest living organism in its day by far; in comparison, the contemporaneous Silurian plant Cooksonia reached only 6 centimetres (2.4 in) in height, and invertebrates were the only other land-dwelling complex multi-cellular life. Prototaxites has been suggested to have used its tall columnar structure for spore dispersal. Alternatively, if Prototaxites contained photosynthetic structures, the height would have increased its ability to capture light. The presence of biomolecules often associated with algae may suggest that Prototaxites was covered by symbiotic or parasitic algae, making it in essence a huge lichen, or even suggesting that it was an alga itself. However, the variability in the ratios in the isotopic signature δ^{13}C among specimens of Prototaxites suggest that it was heterotrophic.

Prototaxites mycelia (strands) were fossilised as they invaded the tissue of vascular plants. In turn, there is evidence of animals inhabiting Prototaxites: Mazes of tubes have been found within some specimens, with the organism re-growing into the voids, leading to speculation that the extinction of Prototaxites may have been caused by such activity. However, evidence of arthropod boreholes in Prototaxites has been found from the early and late Devonian, suggesting the organism survived the stress of boring for many millions of years. Intriguingly, boreholes appeared in Prototaxites long before plants developed a structurally equivalent woody stem, and it is possible that the borers transferred to plants when these evolved. Prototaxites became extinct in the Late Devonian as vascular plants rose to prominence.
