= Mulde Formation =

Geologic formation in Sweden

- Stratigraphic range: Gorstian; ~426 Ma
- Type: Geological formation
- Underlies: Klinberg formation
- Overlies: Slite Formation

Lithology
- Primary: Marlstone, limestone

Location
- Region: South Gotland
- Country: Sweden

Type section
- Named for: Mulde

The Mulde formation is a sequence of Silurian bluish-gray marlstone and agrillceous limestones found on the southwestern part of the island of Gotland. It generally becomes harder and less marly in the upper parts of the formation.

== Fossil content ==
The formation holds some of the best fossils on Gotland, being the best place to find well preserved trilobites. Some examples are Calymene, Dalmanites, Encrinurus and Proteus. Ostracods (beyrichids etc.), brachiopods (Atrypa reticularis, Leptaena, Eospirifer etc.), bryozoans and tentaculitids are also relatively common while corals, grapolites, annelids and cephalopods are more rare.

== See also ==
- Geology of Gotland
