= Seal Cove River =

River in Gaspésie, in Québec, Canada

- Location within Quebec

Location
- Country: Canada
- Province: Quebec
- Region: Gaspésie-Îles-de-la-Madeleine
- MRC: La Côte-de-Gaspé Regional County Municipality

Physical characteristics
- Source: Streams
  - location: Gaspé (Douglastown area)
  - coordinates: 48.759259°N 64.406527°W
  - elevation: 37 metres (121 ft)
- Mouth: Gaspé Bay
  - location: Gaspé (Douglastown area)
  - coordinates: 48.74305°N 64.32833°W
  - elevation: 0 metres (0 ft)
- Length: 93 kilometres (58 mi)

The Seal Cove River, also called Seal Cove brook, is a tributary of the south coast of the St. Lawrence River located in the Douglastown area of Gaspé, in Quebec, in Canada. It forms a tributary of the southeastern shore of Gaspé Bay, which opens onto the western coast of the Gulf of St. Lawrence.

== Geography ==
The Seal Cove River originates from agricultural and forested streams southwest of the center of the village of Douglastown. Its source is located:

- 2.3 kilometres (1.4 mi) from the junction of the Douglastown Barachois pier with the south shore;
- 9.4 kilometres (5.8 mi) southeast of downtown Gaspé;
- 3.5 kilometres (2.2 mi) southeast of the Route 132 bridge spanning the Saint-Jean River.

From its source, the upper section of the Seal Cove River flows in a relatively straight line parallel to the south bank of the Douglastown barachois. Its course spans 9.3 kilometres (5.8 mi) and is divided into the following segments:

- 3.4 kilometres (2.1 mi) eastward, to the McAuley Street bridge;
- 1.7 kilometres (1.1 mi) eastward to the Briand Street bridge;
- 1.6 kilometres (0.99 mi) eastward to Gaul Avenue;
- 2.6 kilometres (1.6 mi) eastward, passing under Route 132, to its confluence.

The confluence of the Seal Cove River flows into the Loups Marins Cove on the southeastern shore of Gaspé Bay. This confluence is located:

- 3.6 kilometres (2.2 mi) northwest of the confluence of the Brillant Cove River;
- 4.5 kilometres (2.8 mi) southeast of the junction of the Douglastown Barachois jetty with the south shore;
- 5.3 kilometres (3.3 mi) north of the boundary of the municipality of Percé.

== Toponymy ==
In the 20^{th} century, starting at its confluence, the river widened for about 300 meters—an area known as a “cove”—where seals regularly stopped to bask on the banks. This name for the river became commonly used among the English-speaking pioneers who settled in the area.

The toponym "rivière Seal Cove" was made official on 5 December 1968 at the Commission de toponymie du Québec.

== Paleontology ==
In 1843, Sir William Edmond Logan discovered a Prototaxites fossil in the Devonian-era strata at Seal Cove.

== See also ==
- Gulf of St. Lawrence
- Gaspé, a city
- La Côte-de-Gaspé Regional County Municipality
- Gaspé Bay
