= Fröjel Formation =

Siliciclastic unit in Sweden

Coordinates: 57°21′40″N 18°10′31″E

The extent of the Fröjel Formation, shaded blue.

The Fröjel Formation is a ten-metre thick siliciclastic unit lying in the carbonate sequence of Gotland, Sweden. Deposited some 424 million years ago during the mid Homerian (late Wenlock, mid Silurian), the sediments represent an unusually high supply of terrigenous sediment into the shallow carbonate platform that was to become the island of Gotland. Their deposition is coincident with a δ^{13}C excursion of +3‰.

== Stratigraphy ==
The formation, nine to eleven metres thick in total, contains two subdivisions, the Svarvare Mudstone Member, two to three metres thick, which is overlain by the Gannarve Siltstone Member, seven to eight metres in thickness. (This is also known as the Silte Siltstone, but does not form part of the Slite Group.) The water depth was decreasing as the Gannarve member was deposited, so the member shows evidence of shallowing up. The formation is overlain with an oolite, which rests unconformably on an erosion surface – a sequence boundary – created at a time of low sea level. This erosional surface formed a flat – a rocky shore which was inundated by the sea at times, but was also subject to subaerial rainfall. Calcium carbonate penetrated the underlying sediment (the top of the Gannarve member), altering the existing dolomitic siltstone.

== Formation ==
The Svarvare member was deposited during the end of a sea level highstand; the Gannarve member was subsequently deposited when falling sea levels exposed land, increasing the influx of terrigenous material. Deposition occurred under storm conditions.

The sea levels fell as a result of increasing ice buildup in Gondwana, which then occupied the South pole; this caused increased carbonate weathering, and possibly increased organic burial, leading to the positive δ^{13}C excursion.

== Exposure ==
The formation is no longer exposed at the surface; it is only known from drill cores.

== Palaeontology ==
Graptolites are abundant in parts of the Svarvare member, which also contains Ramphoprionid polychaetes.

== See also ==
- Geology of Gotland
