= Nematasketum =

Nematasketum Temporal range: Wenlock–Lochkovian

Scientific classification
- Kingdom: Plantae (?)
- Phylum: "Nematophyta"
- Class: †Nematophytina
- Order: †Nematophytales
- Family: †Nematophytaceae
- Genus: †Nematasketum; Burgess & Edwards, 1988

Species
- N. diversiforme Burgess & Edwards, 1988 (type)

Extinct genus of plants

Nematasketum (sometimes incorrectly spelt nematosketum) is a nematophyte with internally thickened tubes, dating from the Wenlock to the Lochkovian epochs. It is thought to be terrestrial or freshwater, and seems to be aligned with the fungi.
