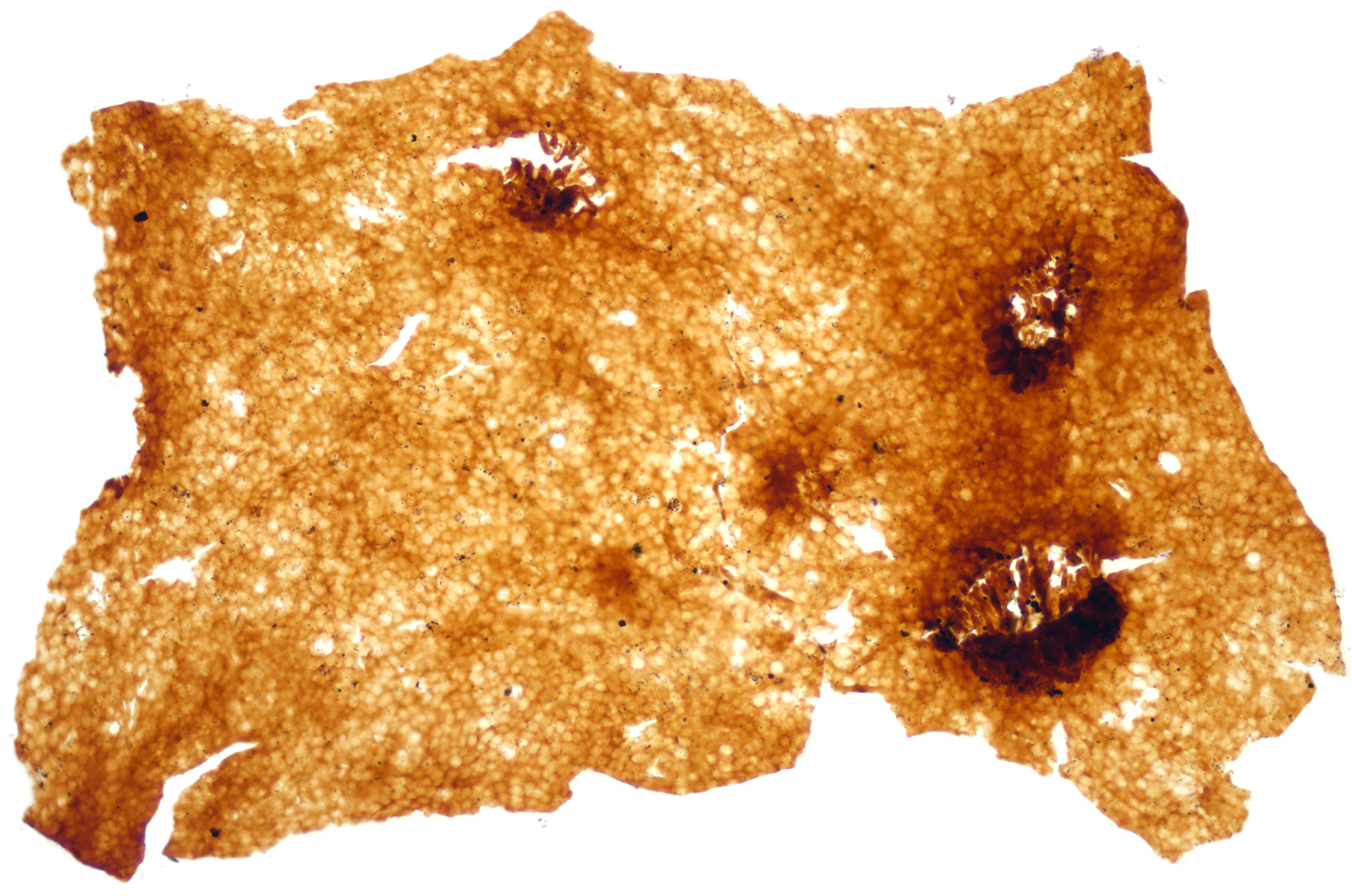
- Cuticle of Nematothallopsis showing reproductive apertures
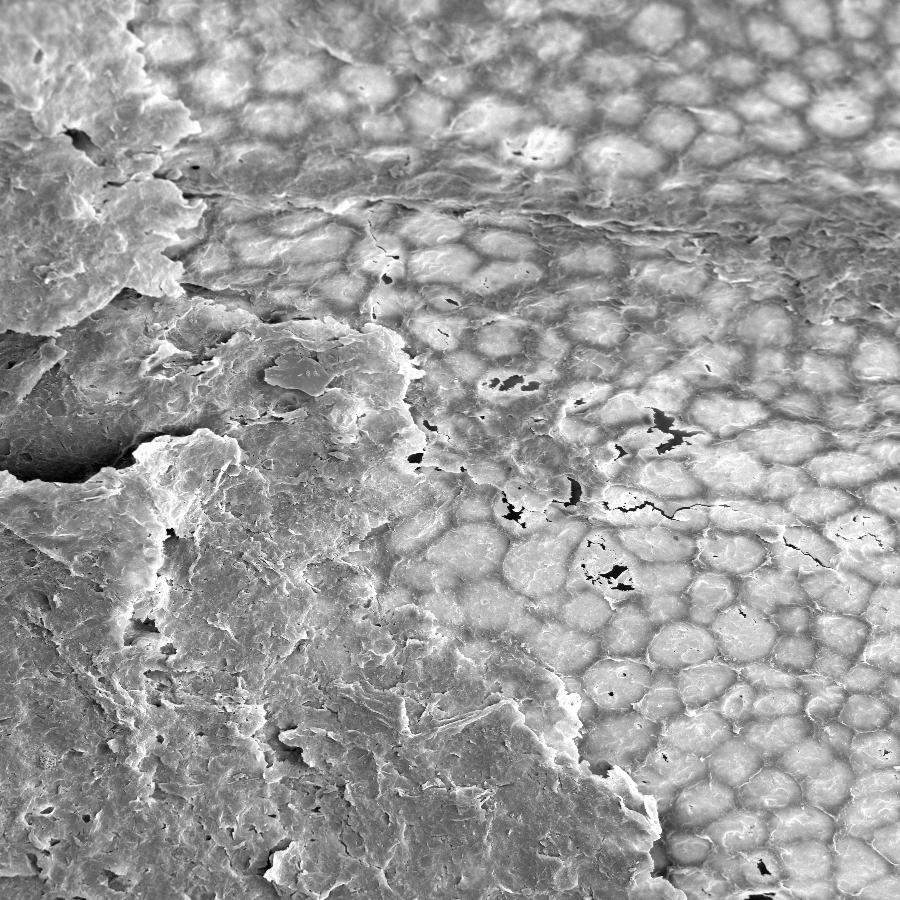
- Cuticle of Nematothallopsis showing pseudocellular patterning

Scientific classification
- Kingdom: Plantae (?)
- Phylum: †"Nematophyta"
- Class: †Nematophytina
- Order: †Nematophytales
- Family: †Nematothalaceae; Strother (1993)
- Genus: †Nematothallus; Lang (1937)

Type species
- Nematothallus pseudovasculosa Lang (1937)

Species
- N. pseudo-vasculosa Lang (1937); N. radiata Lang (1937); N. williamii Edwards et al. (2013)

= Nematothallus =

Nematothallus Temporal range: Ludfordian–Downtonian

Form genus of cuticle-like fossils

Nematothallus is a form genus comprising cuticle-like fossils. Some of its constituents likely represent red algae, whereas others resemble lichens.

== History of research ==
Nematothallus was first described by Lang in 1937, who envisioned it being an early thallose land plant with tubular features and sporophytes, covered by a cuticle which preserved impressions of the underlying cells. He had found abundant disaggregated remains of all three features, none of which were connected to another, leaving his reconstruction of the phytodebris as parts of a single organism highly conjectural. Even so, it was picked up by Jonker (1973), who proposed that Nematothallus represented leaves of Prototaxites, which he interpreted as a red alga.

Further work failed to draw together all aspects of the organism: Edwards (1982) and Edwards and Rose (1984) both provided thorough descriptions of the cuticular aspects of the plants, while Pratt et al. (1978) and Niklas and Smocovitis (1983) focused on the anatomy of the tubes. Indeed, some workers suggested that the name Nematothallus should only apply to the tubes, until Strother (1993) found more complete specimens, with tubes attached to the cuticle. He attempted to unite and formalise the genus, and extended it to include banded tubes, which are instead referred to as nematoclasts (Graham & Gray 2001).

It is possible that Nematothallus consisted of two layers of cuticle, although fossils giving this impression may in fact represent two layers which happened to overlap one another and become stuck. It is not readily established what the cuticle represents. Lang (1945) had it as an epidermal layer, similar to the waxy cuticle of plants today, covering a parenchymatous layer. Alternatively, Edwards (1982) proposed that the inner tissue of Nematothallus comprised stringy tubes, with the cellular patterning produced by their ends.

The genus was later formalised by Strother, who discovered better preserved and more complete specimens in Pennsylvania, America – which appear to show tubes connected to the rims of cuticle. Nematothallus is widespread from the late Silurian, but similar cuticle is reported from the Caradoc epoch (late Ordovician, 450 million years ago). It is, however, difficult to distinguish Nematothallus cuticle from that of arthropods.

Further work by Edwards and Rose has identified oval-shaped growths in places on the cuticles of a limited number of Nematothallus fragments, which develop into holes – whose purpose is unknown. Since they are not found in all Nematothallus individuals, it is unlikely that they were involved in gas exchange. One suggestion based on fossil evidence for their purpose is the release of spores, although this may be the result of spores being trapped between two layers of cuticle.

== Habitat ==
Nematothallus was originally recovered from the Red Downtonian near the base of the Old Red Sandstone, between the clearly marine Ludlow deposits beneath it, and the unambiguously terrestrial Lower Old Red Sandstone. Further samples came from elsewhere in the Lower Old Red Sandstone (St Maughams Group, lowermost Devonian), where they co-occur with plant spores. Additional, older material occurs with Hostinella, Cooksonia and Steganotheca in the Ludlow (upper Ludfordian) Whitcliffe formation.

== Affinity ==
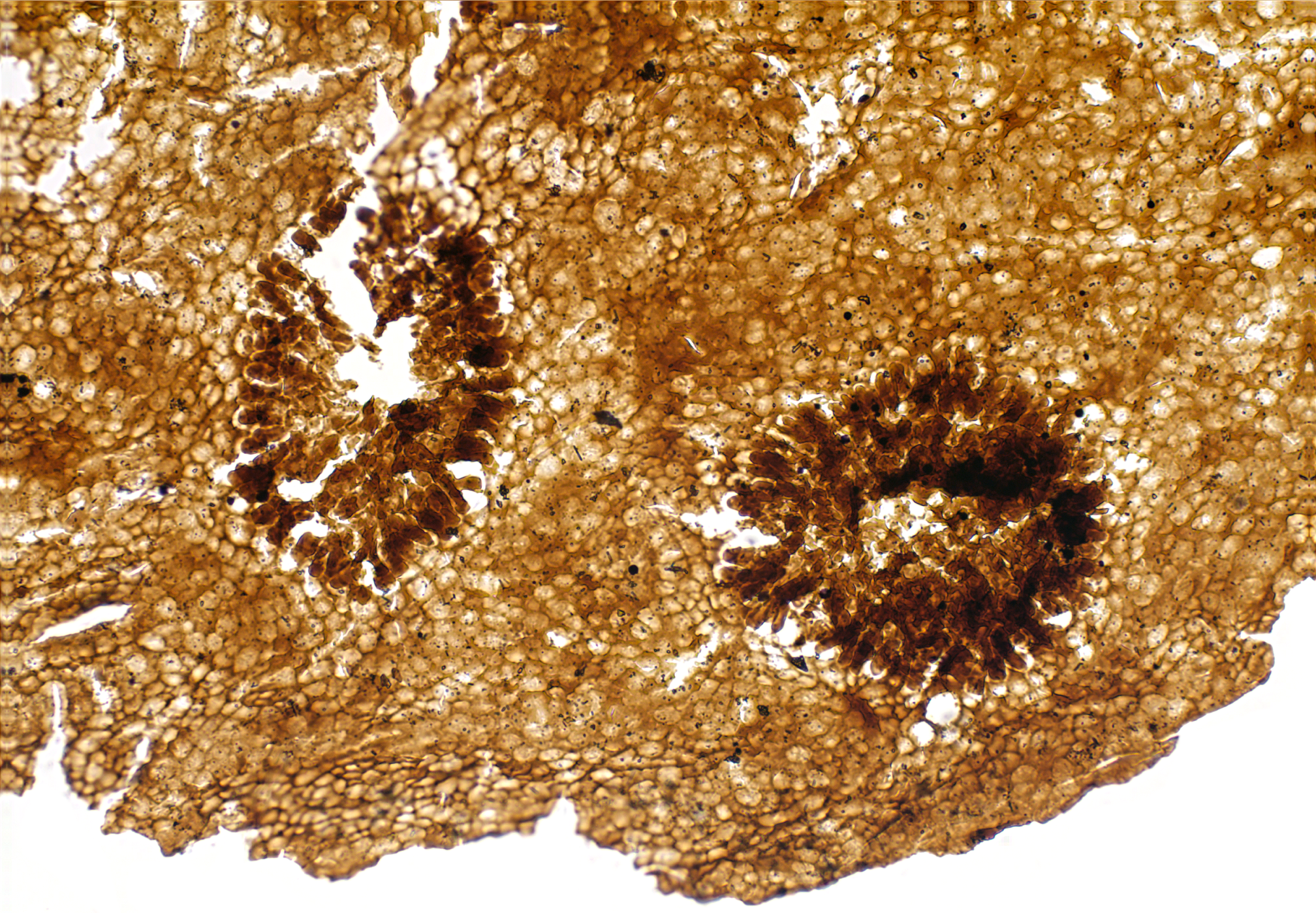
Apertures in Nematothallopsis fringed with filaments and sporting further development

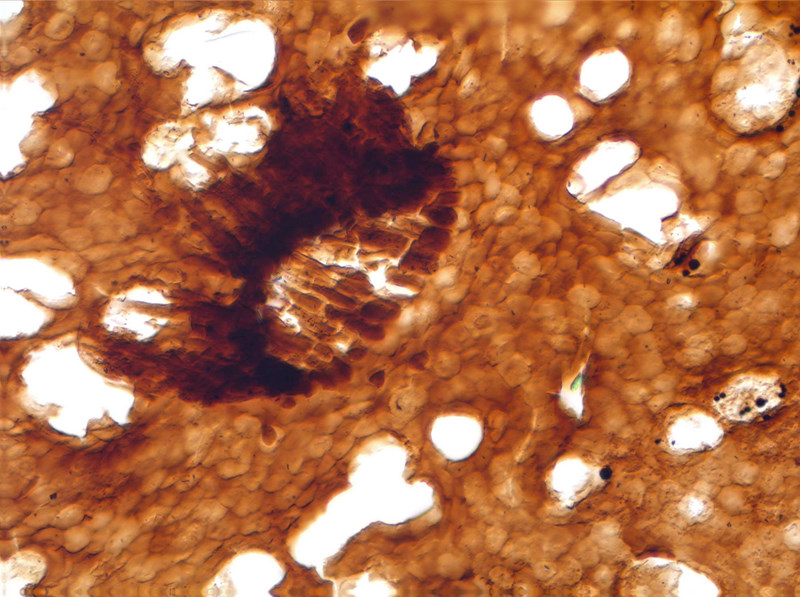
A Nematothallopsis aperture fringed with multi-cellular filaments

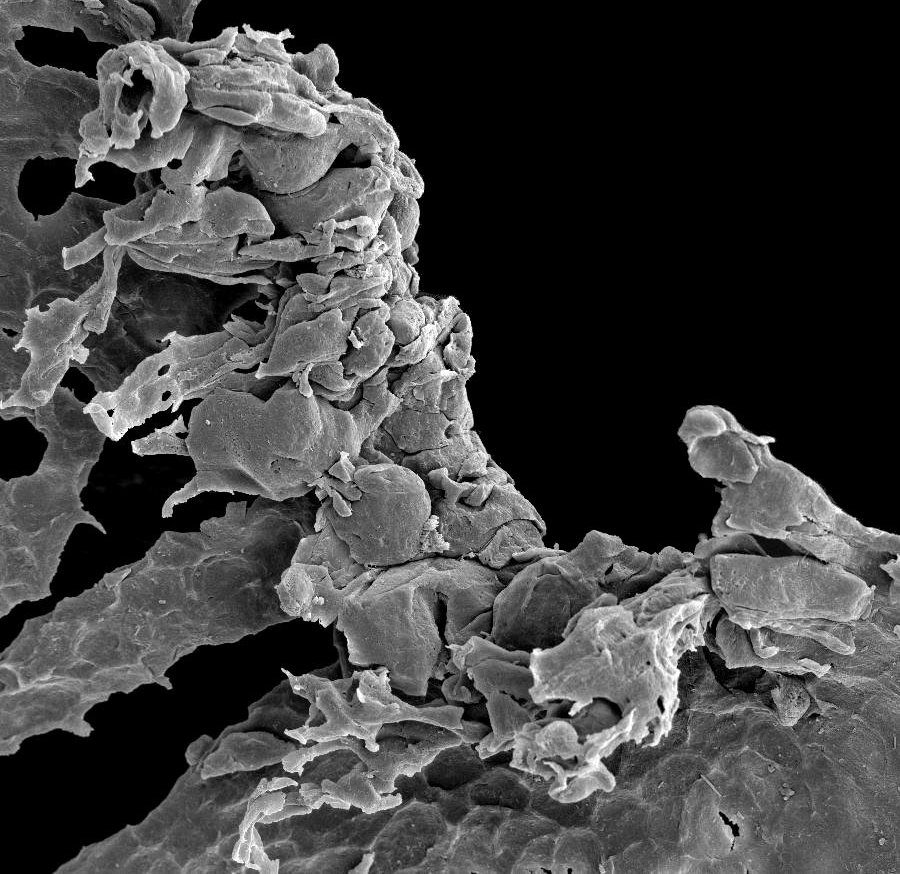
Spores surrounding an aperture in Nematothallopsis

Some material assigned to Nematothallus closely resembles certain lichens, suggesting a lichenous habit – although as the lichens evolved at least six times independently, this does not fully establish the genetic affinity. The biochemistry of the organism is not inconsistent with an algal affinity, but Edwards (1982) considers it unlikely that algae would be preserved as coalified impressions. However, Edwards does note that the surface patterning could have been produced in a similar fashion to surface layers in green algae – that is, by the ends of tightly packed filaments causing indentation on the surface layer. (Just because they were formed in the same way doesn't mean they were formed by green algae, though.) The most likely affinity, for the aperture-bearing cuticles, is with the coralline red algae; the absence of biomineralization suggests a stem-group level affiliation. Whereas Smith & Butterfield contend that this material is separate from the charcoalified lichen-like material, Edwards insists that all the material comes from the same lichen-like organism.

== Synonyms ==
N. taenia and N. lobata were both collapsed into a new form-species Laevitubulus laxus.

== See also ==
- Cosmochlaina, a closely related sister taxon
- Spongiophyton, a similarly enigmatic organism with a similar cuticular patterning. Some material described as Spongiophyton may in fact be Nematothallus.
