= Burgsvik Beds =

Sequence of limestones and sandstones found in Sweden

- Stratigraphic range: Ludfordian; ~420 Ma
- Outcrop map of the Burgsvik Beds (blue)
- Type: Geological formation
- Underlies: Burgsvik Oolite
- Overlies: Eke Formation

Lithology
- Primary: Limestone, sandstone, mudstone

Location
- Coordinates: 57.036990°N 18.284230°E
- Region: South Gotland
- Country: Sweden

Type section
- Named for: Burgsvik

The Burgsvik Beds are a sequence of shallow marine limestones and sandstones found near the locality of Burgsvik in the southern part of Gotland, Sweden. The beds were deposited in the Upper Silurian period, around 420 million years ago, in warm, equatorial waters frequently ravaged by storms, in front of an advancing shoreline. The Burgsvik Formation comprises two members, the Burgsvik Sandstone and the Burgsvik Oolite.

== Appearance ==
The beds consists of thin to very thick layers of a light grey, fine grained argillaceous sandstone, containing a small calcareous element. The sandstones are occasionally intercalated with very thin-bedded blue-grey claystone. In places, the sandstone is overlain by the upper Burgsvik beds, which comprise thin-bedded, light-to-bluish grey, oolitic limestone with alternating sandy beds containing problematic structures described by Manten (1966).

== Depositional environment ==
Manten (1966) deduces that the Burgsvik beds were formed fairly close to the shoreline on a beach "faintly sloping towards the open sea", and that they were extensively reworked by the action of tides and storms. Evidence from cross-bedding and ripple marks is taken to imply a subaqueous origin; rounded oolite pebbles and slightly rounded, size-sorted fossils are evidence of a high-energy environment. The presence of certain species of lamellibranch molluscs suggest a marine setting, and the thick shells present are also indicative of that type of environment. Rare burrows, sometimes found in clay lenses, may have formed in quieter waters that were protected by low sand or reef barriers from wave action. Features that only form on sub-aerial ground, including erosion channels, pothole-like excavations, mud cracks and dendritic rill marks are all present, and provide firm evidence that parts of the environment consisted of beaches or unvegetated ground that occasionally ran dry. Detailed petrographic and paleæoecological analysis of the upper and top few metres of the middle Burgsvik Beds by Stel and de Coo (1977) confirm that this section of the sequence was deposited between the beach and the lower foreshore; oolites and oncolites in the upper strata form in an "agitated shallow marine setting", implying a minor tidal influence. The paleoshoreline was located to the northeast, and facies become progressively more marine in character progressing to the southwest (Jeppsson 2005).

Recent studies suggest that the sandstone might in fact represent delta deposits.

Palaeogeographic reconstructions allow the position of Gotland at the time of deposition to be deduced, and it appears that the Burgsvik beds were deposited near the equator (Torsvik et al. 1993). Combined with the high temperatures of the Silurian, this may have led to very hot, hypersaline waters.

Subdivisions of the Burgsvik beds after Manten (1971)
Grain size -→ Vertical scale in Metres

== Sedimentology ==
Long (1993) recognises three lithofacies in the Burgsvik beds; a poorly exposed silty/sandy mudstone facies dominant in the lower beds, appearing as interbeds in the middle beds; a fine to very fine sandstone; and a "biofacies" consisting of ooids, oncolites and bioclasts. He challenges three interpretations of the sub-aerial sandstone facies. Contrary to Gray et al.'s (1974) tidal mud flat interpretation, Long surmises that it may represent locally emergent offshore bars, near-shore sands or beach deposits. Tides cannot be a dominant factor, as cross-stratification is abundant; storm beds, recognised by hummocky cross-stratification, are also common, suggesting that storms were important in shaping the landscape. Irregularly aligned prod and scour marks on the sea floor shows that waves also played a role. The most favourable conclusion appears to be that the facies represents a shoaling sequence — the migration of sand wave complexes, detached offshore bars (Swift & Field 1981, Brenner et al. 1985) or isolated mid-shelf bars (La Fon 1981).

== Correlation ==
Mainly due to the inhomogeneous nature of shoreline deposits, lateral variation is intense throughout the Burgsvik beds, making correlation difficult (Laufeld 1974). However, using freshly available borehole data, Manten (1971) was able to further sub-divide the Burgsvik beds into 3 members, illustrated above. The upper bed can be recognised across the entire outcrop belt, varying slightly along strike, and has a distinctive lower contact. The lower bed, however, is easily eroded and rarely exposed. To further complicate the matter, the depositional area was being continually provided with sediment — and thus filling up — from the north west. As bioherm detritus and terrigenous infill accumulated, the coast prograded, and the reef zone advanced in front of it to the south west. This pattern is complicated further by sea level changes, making precise interpretation troublesome (Laufeld 1974).

Correlation to units elsewhere in the world is aided by the high-resolution conodont data available; the beds are in the Ozarkodina snajdri conodont subdivision of the Pseudomonoclimacis latilobus graptolite zone, which is also well displayed in, for example, Estonia (Jeppsson et al. 1994, Jeppsson & Männik 1993).

== Paleontological interest ==
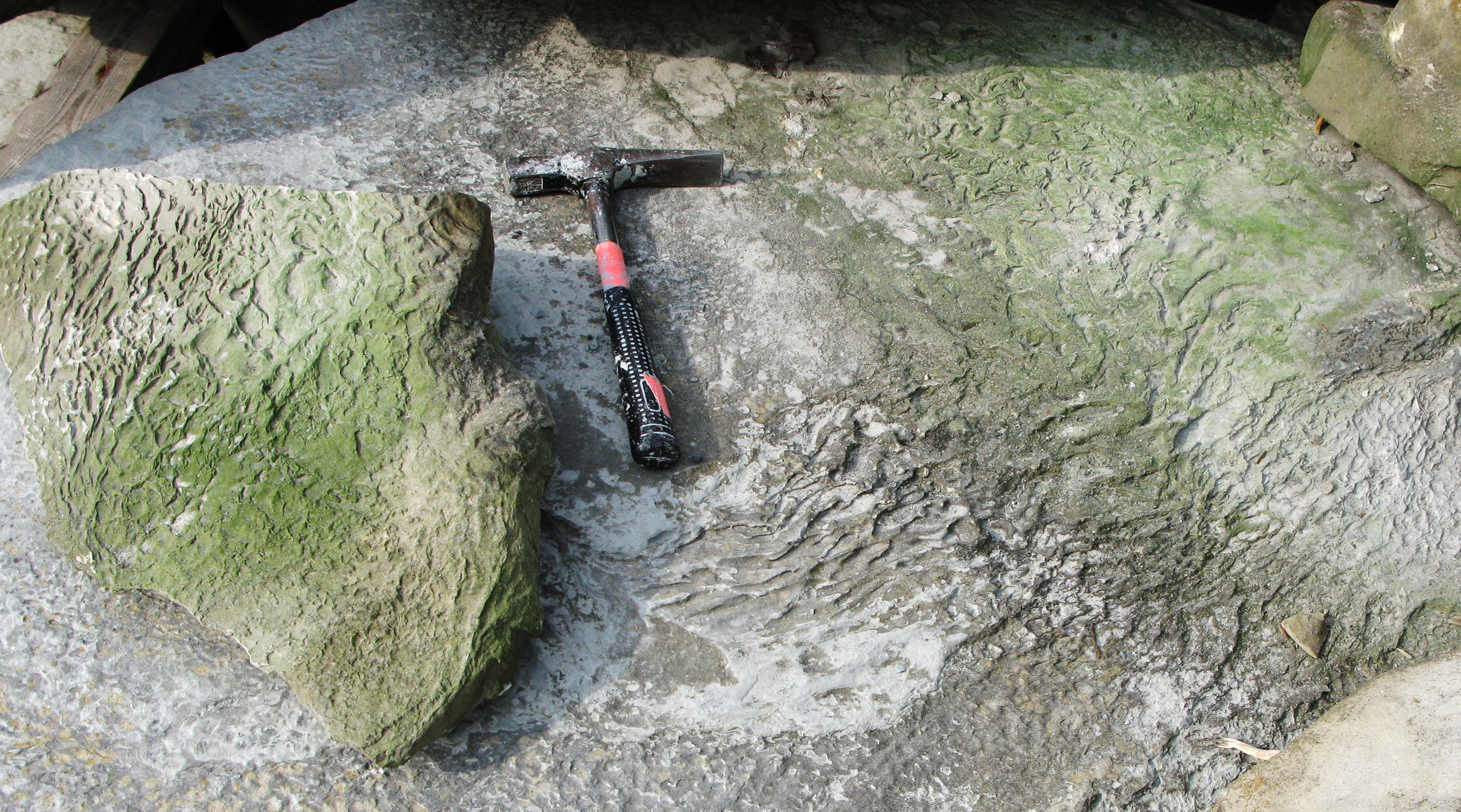
This wrinkled "elephant skin" texture is a trace fossil of a non-stromatolite microbial mat. The image shows the location, in the Burgsvik beds, where the texture was first identified as evidence of a microbial mat.

As well as reef-building organisms and the thick-shelled Lamellibranchia mentioned above, the Burgsvik beds are also of interest to micropalæontologists. Their quiet tectonic history — with the depth of burial never exceeding 200 metres (660 ft) and "no thermal maturation" occurring (Jeppsson 1983) — means that organic material is preserved relatively unscathed, to a degree of quality barely rivalled anywhere else on earth for rocks of this age - indeed, the preservation is equivalent to that expected from the Tertiary (Sherwood-Pike and Gray 1985). Dissolution of the rocks in hydrofluoric acid leaves the organic matter unscathed, and putative fungi (Ornatifilum) and fæcal pellets have been unearthed (Sherwood-Pike and Gray 1985), as well as supposed euglenids (Gray and Boucot 1989): the latter being of particular interest as not one other fossil euglenid is known. A lack of marine macrofossils in plant-rich beds suggests that large grazers or predators may have been absent, perhaps because water depths were so shallow - this may have aided fossil preservation (Gray et al. 1974).

The beds are the first location where it was recognized that "elephant skin" wrinkles in marine sediments are trace fossils of microbial mats, which were Earth's most sophisticated form of life for nearly 2 billion years and are still the major factors maintaining life on Earth.

== Association with mass extinction ==
Martma et al. (2005) assign a Mid-Ludfordian (Upper Ludlow) age to the Burgsvik, which places the beds in close temporal proximity to the Lau event, a late Silurian mass extinction. They also note a positive δ^{13}C_{org} excursion in the Burgsvik and underlying Eke beds. Such excursions are normally associated with the decrease in oceanic productivity caused by mass extinctions. This could also be interpreted as climate, mainly precipitation, controlling the distribution of facies; high δ^{13}C is often observed in deposits formed in arid conditions.

Calner (2005) notes that anachronistic facies are observed in other strata spanning the Lau event, places the Burgsvik beds immediately after this mass extinction (Calner 2005b), noting the occurrence of flat-pebble conglomerates in the underlying Eke beds.

Correlation with the P-S episodes postulated by Jeppsson (1990) suggests that the beds were deposited during a wet period - a P episode.

== See also ==
- Geology of Gotland
- Fröjel Formation

== Bibliography ==
- Agterberg, F.P. (1958). "An undulation of the rate of sedimentation in southern Gotland". Geologie en Mijnbouw. 20: 253–260.
- Brenner, R.L.; Swift, D.J.P.; Gaynor, G.C. (1985). "Re-evaluation of coquinoid sandstone depositional model, Upper Jurassic of central Wyoming and south-central Montana". Sedimentology. 32 (3): 363–372. Bibcode:1985Sedim..32..363B. doi:10.1111/j.1365-3091.1985.tb00517.x.
- Calner, M. (2005-04-01). "A Late Silurian extinction event and anachronistic period". Geology. 33 (4): 305–308. Bibcode:2005Geo....33..305C. doi:10.1130/G21185.1.
- Comments by R. Riding & M. Calner (2005). "Reply to 'A Late Silurian extinction event and anachronistic period'" (PDF). Geology. 33 (1): e92–3. Bibcode:2005Geo....33E..92C. doi:10.1130/0091-7613-33.1.e92.
- Gray, J.; Boucot, A. J. (1989). "Is Moyeria a euglenoid?". Lethaia. 22 (4): 447–456. Bibcode:1989Letha..22..447G. doi:10.1111/j.1502-3931.1989.tb01449.x.
- Gray, J.; Laufeld, S.; Boucot, A.J. (1974). "Silurian Trilete Spores and Spore Tetrads from Gotland: Their Implications for Land Plant Evolution". Science. 185 (4147): 260–3. Bibcode:1974Sci...185..260G. doi:10.1126/science.185.4147.260. PMID 17812053. S2CID 22967281.
- Hagström, J. (1997). "Land-derived palynomorphs from the Silurian of Gotland, Sweden". GFF. 119 (4): 301–316. Bibcode:1997GFF...119..301H. doi:10.1080/11035899709546492.
- Jeppsson, L. (1983). "Silurian conodont faunas from Gotland". Fossils and Strata. 15: 121–144. doi:10.18261/8200067378-1983-11. ISBN 8200067378.
- Jeppsson, L. (December 2005). "Conodont-based revisions of the Late Ludfordian on Gotland, Sweden" (PDF). GFF. 127 (4): 273–282. Bibcode:2005GFF...127..273J. CiteSeerX 10.1.1.528.9356. doi:10.1080/11035890501274273. ISSN 1103-5897. S2CID 129703615. Archived from the original (PDF) on 2008-12-17.
- Jeppsson, L. (November 30, 2000). "Ludlow (late Silurian) oceanic episodes and events". Journal of the Geological Society: 1137. Archived from the original on March 8, 2005 – via FindArticles.
- Jeppsson, L.; Männik, P. (1993). "High-resolution correlations between Gotland and Estonia near the base of the Wenlock". Terra Nova. 5 (4): 348–358. Bibcode:1993TeNov...5..348J. doi:10.1111/j.1365-3121.1993.tb00268.x.
- Jeppsson, L.; Viira, V.; Männik, P. (1994). "Silurian conodont-based correlations between Gotland (Sweden) and Saaremaa (Estonia)". Geological Magazine. 131 (2): 201–218. Bibcode:1994GeoM..131..201J. doi:10.1017/S0016756800010736. S2CID 130792234.
- Jeppsson, L. (1990). "An oceanic model for lithological and faunal changes tested on the Silurian record". Journal of the Geological Society. 147 (4): 663–674. Bibcode:1990JGSoc.147..663J. doi:10.1144/gsjgs.147.4.0663. S2CID 129385359.
- Laufeld, S. (1974). Silurian Chitinozoa from Gotland. Fossils and Strata. Universitetsforlaget.
- Long, D.G.F. (1993). "The Burgsvik beds, an Upper Silurian storm generated sand ridge complex in southern Gotland". Geologiska Föreningen i Stockholm Förhandlingar. 115 (4): 299–309. doi:10.1080/11035899309453917. ISSN 0016-786X.
- Manten, A.A. (1966). "Some problematic shallow-marine structures". Marine Geol. 4 (3): 227–232. Bibcode:1966MGeol...4..227M. doi:10.1016/0025-3227(66)90023-5. hdl:1874/16526. S2CID 129854399. Archived from the original on 2008-10-21.
- Manten, A.A. (1971). Silurian reefs of Gotland. Developments in sedimentology. Vol. 13. Amsterdam: Elsevier. p. 539. ISBN 978-0-444-40706-1.
- Martma; et al. (2005). "The Wenlock-Ludlow carbon isotope trend in the Vidukle core, Lithuania, and its relations with oceanic events" (PDF). Geological Quarterly. 49 (2): 223–234. Archived from the original (PDF) on 2007-09-27.
- Sherwood-Pike, M.A.; Gray, J. (1985). "Silurian fungal remains: probable records of the class Ascomycetes". Lethaia. 18 (1): 1–20. Bibcode:1985Letha..18....1S. doi:10.1111/j.1502-3931.1985.tb00680.x.
- Stel, J.H.; de Coo, J.C.M. (1977). "The Silurian Upper Burgsvik and Lower Hamra--Sundre Beds, Gotland". Scripta Geologica. 44. Rijksmuseum van Geologie en Mineralogie: 1–43.
- Swift, D. J. P.; Field, M. E. (1981). "Evolution of a classic sand ridge field: Maryland sector, North American inner shelf". Sedimentology. 28 (4): 461–482. Bibcode:1981Sedim..28..461S. doi:10.1111/j.1365-3091.1981.tb01695.x.
- Torsvik, T.H.; Trench, A.; Svensson, I.; Walderhaug, H.J. (1993). "Palaeogeographic significance of mid-Silurian palaeomagnetic results from southern Britain-major revision of the apparent polar wander path for eastern Avalonia". Geophysical Journal International. 113 (3): 651–668. Bibcode:1993GeoJI.113..651T. doi:10.1111/j.1365-246X.1993.tb04658.x.
