= Hollandophyton =

Hollandophyton Temporal range: Late Silurian

Scientific classification
- Kingdom: Plantae
- Clade: Embryophytes
- Clade: Polysporangiophytes
- Genus: †Hollandophyton; C. Rogerson et al.

Species
- H. colliculum C. Rogerson et al.

Extinct genus of plants

Hollandophyton is a genus of extinct plants known from fossils found in Shropshire, England, in rocks of upper Silurian age (Přídolí, around 430 to 420 million years ago). The specimens are fragmentary, consisting of leafless stems (axes) which branched dichotomously and bore kidney-shaped spore-forming organs or sporangia, apparently at their tips. The internal structure of the stems is unknown.

== Description ==
Fossils of Hollandophyton colliculum were found near Ludlow, Shropshire, England, in siltstones of upper Silurian age (Přídolí, around 430 to 420 million years ago). They were described as "mesofossils", i.e. relatively small fragments, the longest of which was only 1.25 mm long, making it difficult to obtain a full understanding of the growth habit of the plant. H. colliculum consisted of leafless stems (axes) which branched dichotomously; those found were all less than 0.7 mm wide. In the fossils, stems appear to have spiralled in a clockwise direction from the bottom to the top, although this effect may have been increased by drying prior to preservation.

Sporangia were found attached to short lengths of stem. Rogerson et al. consider that these were the tips of stems, but say that they may have been stalks attached to the sides of stems. Hence it is unclear whether sporangia were borne terminally or laterally. The sporangia were kidney-shaped (reniform), 1.0 to 1.6 mm wide and 0.5 to 0.8 mm high. The stem or stalk widened somewhat where it joined the sporangium. The sporangium wall contained swollen cells and had a 'bumpy' appearance. Spores appear to have been released through the appearance of an opening in a depression around the top of the sporangium, not sufficiently wide to result in its disintegration into two valves. Rogerson et al. say that this is the earliest evidence for "predetermined" dehiscence (opening to release spores). Triradiate spores with fine surface markings were found. They were all of one size, up to 30 μm in diameter.

In one specimen, two stomata were found immediately below the attachment of a sporangium to the stem. The best preserved is circular, around 35 μm in diameter, with two guard cells. Hollandophyton was (at least in 2002) the oldest fossil on which both stomata and sporangia have been found.

== Taxonomy ==
The genus Hollandophyton was published in 2002 by Rogerson et al., the name being in honour of the contribution to Silurian geology by C.H. Holland. The specific epithet colliculum, from the Latin collicula, a little hill, refers to the "hillocky" appearance of the sporangia.

== Phylogeny ==
The relationships of Hollandophyton are uncertain. The internal anatomy of the stem is unknown. The overall organization of the plant – branching stems with terminal sporangia – resembles that of the genus Cooksonia, including the species now called Aberlemnia caledonica (formerly Cooksonia caledonica). The twisted stems resemble Tortilicaulis. Although the general shape of the sporangia resembles that of zosterophylls, Hollandophyton sporangia lack the thickened edges of the sporangial 'valves' which are characteristic of species assigned to this group, such as Zosterophyllum llanoveranum or Ventarura lyonii. Rogerson et al. conclude that Hollandophyton's "phylogenetic significance remains obscure."
