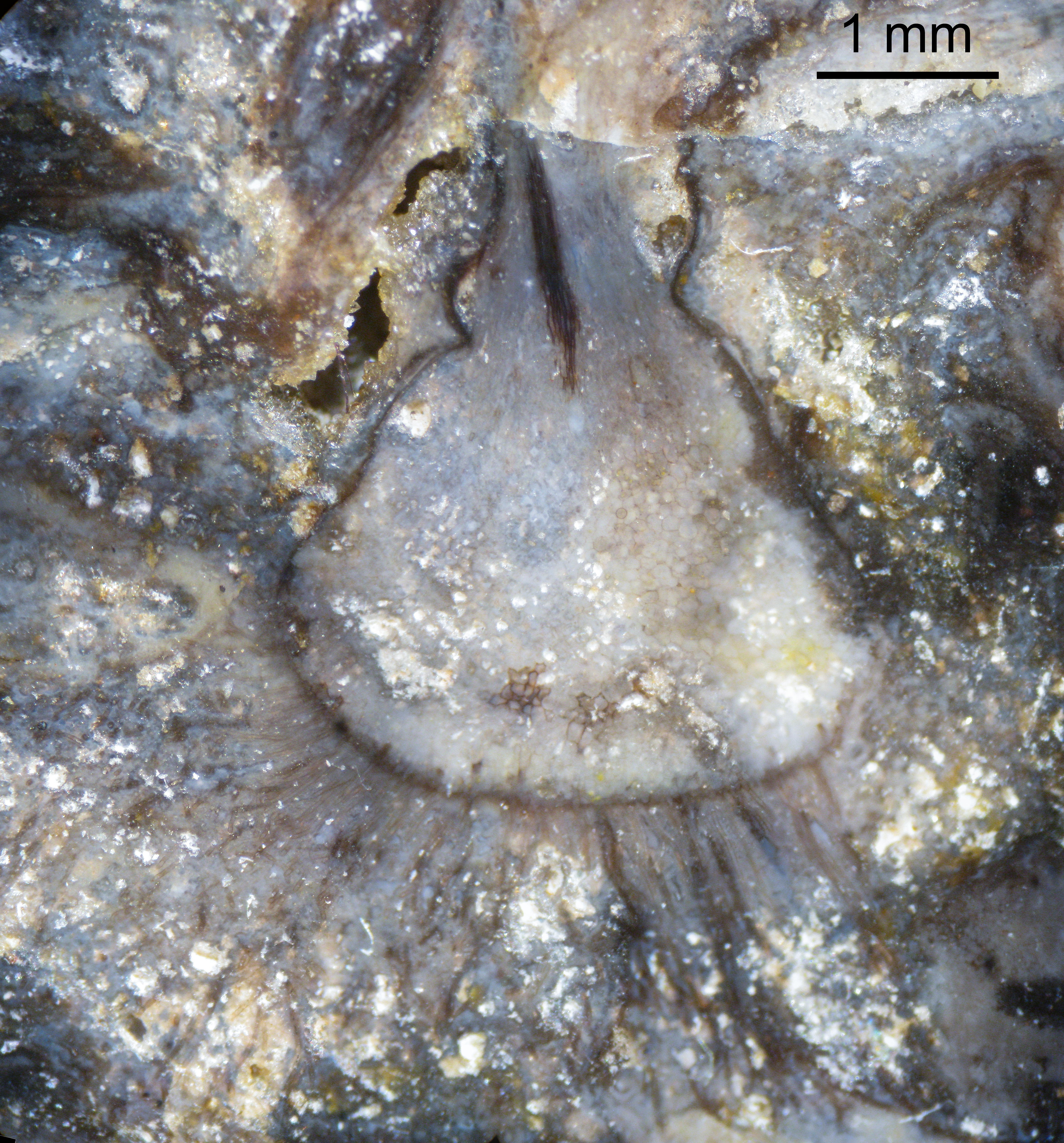
- Fossil corm (tuber) in Rhynie chert

Scientific classification
- Kingdom: Plantae
- Clade: Embryophytes
- Class: †Horneophytopsida
- Order: †Horneophytales
- Family: †Horneophytaceae; Kenrick & Crane (1997)
- Genus: †Horneophyton; Bargh. & Darrah (1938)
- Species: †H. lignieri

Binomial name
- †Horneophyton lignieri (Kidston & Lang 1920) Barghoorn & Darrah 1938

Synonyms
- Genus: Hornea Kidston & Lang 1920 non Baker 1877; ?Langiophyton Remy & Hass 1991; Species: Hornea lignieri Kidston & Lang 1920; ?Langiophyton lignieri (Kidston & Lang 1920) Remy & Hass 1991; ?Langiophyton mackiei Remy & Hass 1991

= Horneophyton =

Horneophyton Temporal range: Early Devonian
- Schematic reconstruction of Horneophyton lignieri to show its growth habit

Extinct genus of early plants

Horneophyton is an extinct early plant which may form a "missing link" between the hornworts and the Rhyniopsida. It is a member of the class Horneophytopsida. Horneophyton is among the most abundant fossil organisms found in the Rhynie chert, a Devonian Lagerstätte in Aberdeenshire, UK. A single species, Horneophyton lignieri, is known. Its probable female gametophyte is the form taxon Langiophyton mackiei.

== Description ==
The sporophyte had bare stems (axes) up to 20 cm high and about 2 mm in diameter with an undivided cortex. Stomata were present but rare. There was a thin central strand of conducting tissue, but this was not reinforced with spiral and reticulate thickenings and thus does not constitute true vascular tissue. Early stages of development of the sporophytes of Horneophyton (as of hornworts) may have been dependent on their parent gametophytes for nutrition, but mature specimens have expanded, corm-like bases to their stems, up to 6 mm in diameter, that bore rhizoids and appear to be anchored in soil, suggesting a capacity for independent existence after the gametophyte had degenerated.

The sporangium (spore-forming organ) is unique among both living and fossil plants, consisting as it does of branched lobes at the apex of some of the branches of the stem. Each lobe contains a central collumella, analogous to the sporangia of hornworts; however, the sporangia of hornworts are not branched. The number of lobes possessed by a sporangium varied; at least three orders of dichotomous branching have been found, resulting in more than four lobes. The sporangia were much less regular than shown in most reconstructions (including that opposite), and they had 'bumps' or emergences on them. Spores were released through a slit at the top of each lobe. The sporangia of Horneophyton contained trilete meiospores, the surfaces of which were decorated with short conical protuberances.

The female gametophyte of the plant has been recognised and described as the form taxon Langiophyton mackiei. It grew to a height of around 6 cm, and was free-living. The species was dioicous (unisexual), since it produced male and female gametes on separate gametophytes.

Horneophyton grew on sandy, organic-rich soil in damp to wet locations. They usually grew as isolated individuals.

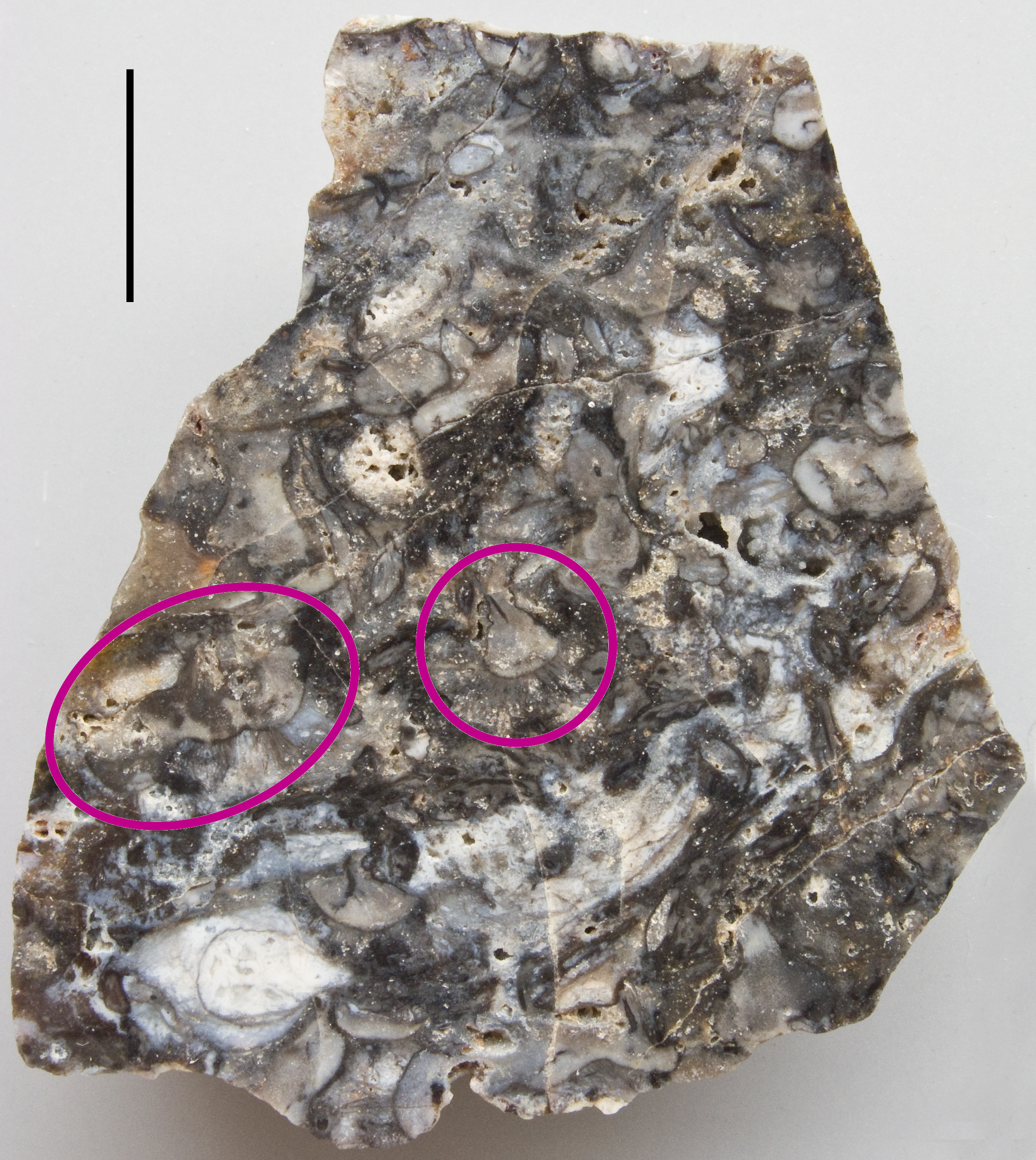
Surface view of a polished piece of Rhynie chert showing many corms/tubers of Horneophyton. Marked examples: centre – single corm with rhizoids; left – linked corms with rhizoids. Scale bar is 1 cm.

== Taxonomy ==
First named by Kidston and Lang in 1920 from Early Devonian fossils in the Rhynie chert, the original generic name Hornea was later found to already refer to a flowering plant in the family Sapindaceae, Hornea mauritiana, leading Barghoorn and Darrah to propose renaming the genus Horneophyton in 1938. It was classified as a rhyniophyte (subdivision Rhyniophytina) by Banks, but the absence of true vascular tissue led Kenrick and Crane in 1997 to create a new class, Horneophytopsida, for this and similar genera. A single species, Horneophyton lignieri, has been described.

== Phylogeny ==
A possible phylogeny for Horneophyton is shown below (based on Crane et al. for the polysporangiophytes and Qiu et al. for the bryophytes.

- liverworts
- - mosses
  - - hornworts
    - polysporangiophytes
      - - Aglaophyton
        - Tracheophyta
      - Horneophytopsida
        - Tortilicaulis
        - - Caia
          - Horneophyton

With vascular tissue but bryophyte-like vascular tissue and sporangia, the organism has been considered a missing link between the hornworts and the vascular plants or tracheophytes (which molecular data suggest are sister groups). Features suggesting a relationship with the hornworts include the general form of its sporangia; its corm also resembles the foot of some hornworts. The free living nature of its sporophytes, and the fact that they branching repeatedly, are marked differences which force it into the stem group of tracheophytes (along with Aglaophyton).
