= Palaeonema =

Palaeonema Temporal range: Early Devonian

Scientific classification
- Kingdom: Animalia
- Phylum: Nematoda
- Class: Enoplea
- Order: Enoplida
- Family: †Palaeonematidae; Poinar, Kerp & Hass, 2008
- Genus: †Palaeonema; Poinar, Kerp & Hass, 2008
- Species: †P. phyticum

Binomial name
- †Palaeonema phyticum Poinar, Kerp & Hass, 2008

Genus of roundworms

Palaeonema is an extinct genus of nematodes from the Early Devonian. It contains only one species, Palaeonema phyticum, and is the only member of the family Palaeonematidae. P. phyticum is the oldest known fossil nematode, and was parasitic upon the Rhynie chert plant Agalophyton.

According to George Poinar Jr. (2011), the family Palaeonematidae is placed in the order Enoplida.
