= Gaoyuzhuang Formation =

Geologic formation in China

- Stratigraphic range: 1588.8±6.5 Ma
- Type: Formation
- Underlies: Yangzhuang Formation
- Overlies: Dahongyu Formation
- Thickness: ~1800 m

Location
- Country: China

The Gaoyuzhuang Formation is a geologic formation in China. It preserves fossils dating back to the Calymmian period of the Mesoproterozoic. It is one of the first formations to preserve definitive macroscopic eukaryotes, at almost 1.6 billion years old. In addition to this, the site preserves a diverse microbiota with various cyanobacteria and fungus-like fossils known, alongside possibly the earliest testate amoebae.

== Paleobiota ==
After Chen et al, 2023, Shi et al, 2017, Liu et al, 2015, Seong-Joo & Golubic, 1999 and Li et al., 2026

Color key: Taxon / Reclassified taxon / Taxon falsely reported as present / Dubious taxon or junior synonym / Ichnotaxon / Ootaxon / Morphotaxon	Notes; Uncertain or tentative taxa are in small text; ~~crossed out~~ taxa are discredited.

=== Paleobiota ===
Paleobiota
Genus	Species	Notes	Images
Grandilingulata	G. qianxiensis	Enigmatic frond-like organism	A restoration of Grandilingulata qianxiensis
Tuanshanzia	T. linearis; T. parva; T. fasciata	Enigmatic frond-like organism; possibly within Archaeplastida	A restoration of Tuanshanzia fasciaria
Proterotainia	P. sp	Enigmatic filamentous organism, possibly within Vendotaenida.	A restoration of Proterotainia sp.
Qingshania	Q. kuanchengensis	Enigmatic filamentous eukaryote	
Ramificansa	R. moniliformis; R. jianshanziensis	Enigmatic filamentous alga, possibly a rhodophyte	
Cycliocyrillium	C. simplex; C. torquata	Vase-shaped microfossil, possible testate amoeba	
Bonniea	B. pytinaia	Vase-shaped microfossil, possible testate amoeba	
Limeta	L. lagenifprmis	Vase-shaped microfossil, possible testate amoeba	
Siphonophycus	S. thulenema; S. robustum; S. typicum; S. solidum; S. inornatum; S. kestron	Cyanobacteria	Line drawing reconstruction of Siphonophycus attenuatum
Oscillatoriopsis	O. obtusa; O. amadeus; O. longa; O. princeps; O. gigas	Cyanobacteria	Line drawing reconstruction of Oscillatoriopsis
Veteronostocale	V. majusculus; V. grandis	Cyanobacteria	
Cyanonema	C. attenuate; C. grandis	Cyanobacteria	
Palaeolyngbya	P. catenata; P. maxima; P. barghoorniana	Cyanobacteria	Line drawing reconstruction of Palaeolyngbya helva
Coccostratus	C. dispergens	Cyanobacteria	
Eoentophysalis	E. belcherensis	Cyanobacteria	
Eoschizothrix	E. composita	Cyanobacteria	
Arctacellularia	A. ellipsoidea	Cyanobacteria	
Chlorogloeaopsis	C. contexta	Cyanobacteria	
Archaeoellipsoides	A. obesus	Cyanobacteria	
Obruchevella	O. pussila; O. sp	Cyanobacteria, commonly found in Neoproterozoic sediments	
Changchengonema	C. yamenziensis	Cyanobacteria	
Eoaphanocapsa	E. sp.	Cyanobacteria	
Eosynechococcus	E. moorei; E. brevis	Cyanobacteria	
Myxococcoides	M. grandis; M. distola	Cyanobacteria	
Palaeoanacystis	P. sp	Cyanobacteria	
Sphaerophycus	S. parvum	Cyanobacteria	
Tetraphycus	T. sp	Cyanobacteria	
Saccolyngbya	S. qingshanensis	Cyanobacteria	
Cephalophytarion	C. sp	Cyanobacteria	Line drawing reconstruction of Cephalophytarion variabile
Coniunctiophycus	C. sp; C. majorinum	Acritarch	
Clonophycus	C. sp	Acritarch	
Leiosphaeridia	L. sp	Acritarch	
Leioarachnitum	L. sp	Acritarch	
Trachysphaeridium	T. aperturum	Acritarch	
Microconcentrica	M. testudinarius	Acritarch	
Baltisphaeridium	B. bulbosum	Acritarch	
Cornutosphaera	C. triquetrus	Acritarch	
Paleamorpha	P. squanifera	Acritarch	

In addition to these fossils, five unnamed forms are also known. Forms A and B are only known from one specimen, Form C is too fragmentary to be named, and Forms D and E bear no resemblance to any plant, prokaryote, animal or protist. However, various hyphomycetous fungi do form similar structures to forms D and E, thus they may be within this group. Alongside this, a possibly new VSM (vase-shaped microfossil) genus is also known, however it remains indeterminate due to limited material and similarities in shape to Limeta.
