= Palaeolyngbya =

Palaeolyngbya Temporal range: Calymmian-Devonian, 1590–400 Ma
- Line drawing reconstruction of the species Palaeolyngbya helva

Scientific classification
- Domain: Bacteria
- Kingdom: Bacillati
- Phylum: Cyanobacteriota
- Class: Cyanophyceae
- Order: Oscillatoriales
- Family: Oscillatoriaceae
- Genus: †Palaeolyngbya; Schopf, 1968

Type species
- †Palaeolyngbya barhoorniana Schopf, 1968

Species
- See text

Extinct genus of cyanobacteria

Palaeolyngbya (meaning "primitive Lyngbya" or "before Lyngbya") is a cyanobacteria from the Proterozoic. Its cells are roughly 10 microns wide. Fossils have been recorded from the Bitter Springs Group, Kushalgarh Formation, Rhynie Chert and Gaoyuzhuang Formation.

== List of species ==
- Palaeolyngbya baraudensis Mandal et al, 1984
- Palaeolyngbya barhoorniana Schopf, 1968
- Palaeolyngbya catenata Hermann, 1974
- Palaeolyngbya candeda Luo et al, 1983
- Palaeolyngbya distincta Mandal et al, 1984
- Palaeolyngbya elongata Mandal et al, 1984
- Palaeolyngbya kerpii Krings, 2019
- Palaeolyngbya minor Schopf and Blacic, 1971
- Palaeolyngbya sinica Yin and Li, 1978
