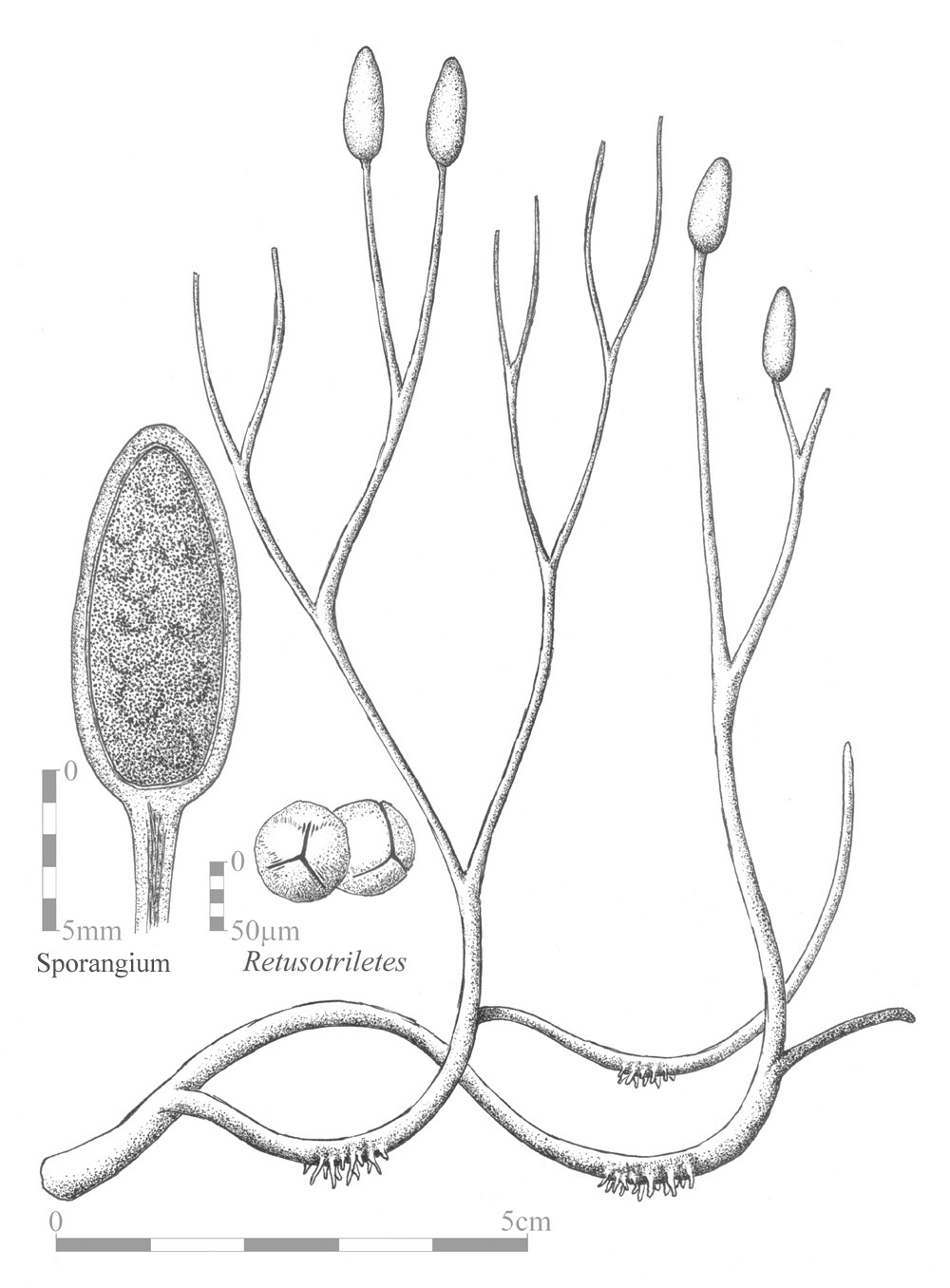
- Reconstruction of the sporophyte of Aglaophyton, illustrating bifurcating axes with terminal sporangia, and rhizoids. Insets show a cross-section of a sporangium and the probable spores.

Scientific classification
- Kingdom: Plantae
- Clade: Embryophytes
- Clade: Polysporangiophytes
- Genus: †Aglaophyton; D.S.Edwards 1986

Species
- †A. major (Kidston & Lang 1920) Edwards 1986

Synonyms
- Lyonophyton Remy & Remy 1980; Rhynia major Kidston & Lang 1920; Lyonophyton rhyniensis Remy & Remy 1980

= Aglaophyton =

Aglaophyton Temporal range: Early Devonian

Extinct (Devonian) prevascular land plant

Aglaophyton major (or more correctly Aglaophyton majus) was the sporophyte generation of a diplohaplontic, pre-vascular, axial, free-sporing land plant of the Lower Devonian (Pragian stage, around 410 million years ago). It had anatomical features intermediate between those of the bryophytes and vascular plants or tracheophytes.

A. major was first described by Kidston and Lang in 1920 as the new species Rhynia major. The species is known only from the Rhynie chert in Aberdeenshire, Scotland, where it grew in the vicinity of a silica-rich hot spring, together with a number of associated vascular plants such as a smaller species Rhynia gwynne-vaughanii which may be interpreted as a representative of the ancestors of modern vascular plants and Asteroxylon mackei, which was an ancestor of modern clubmosses (Lycopsida).

== Description ==
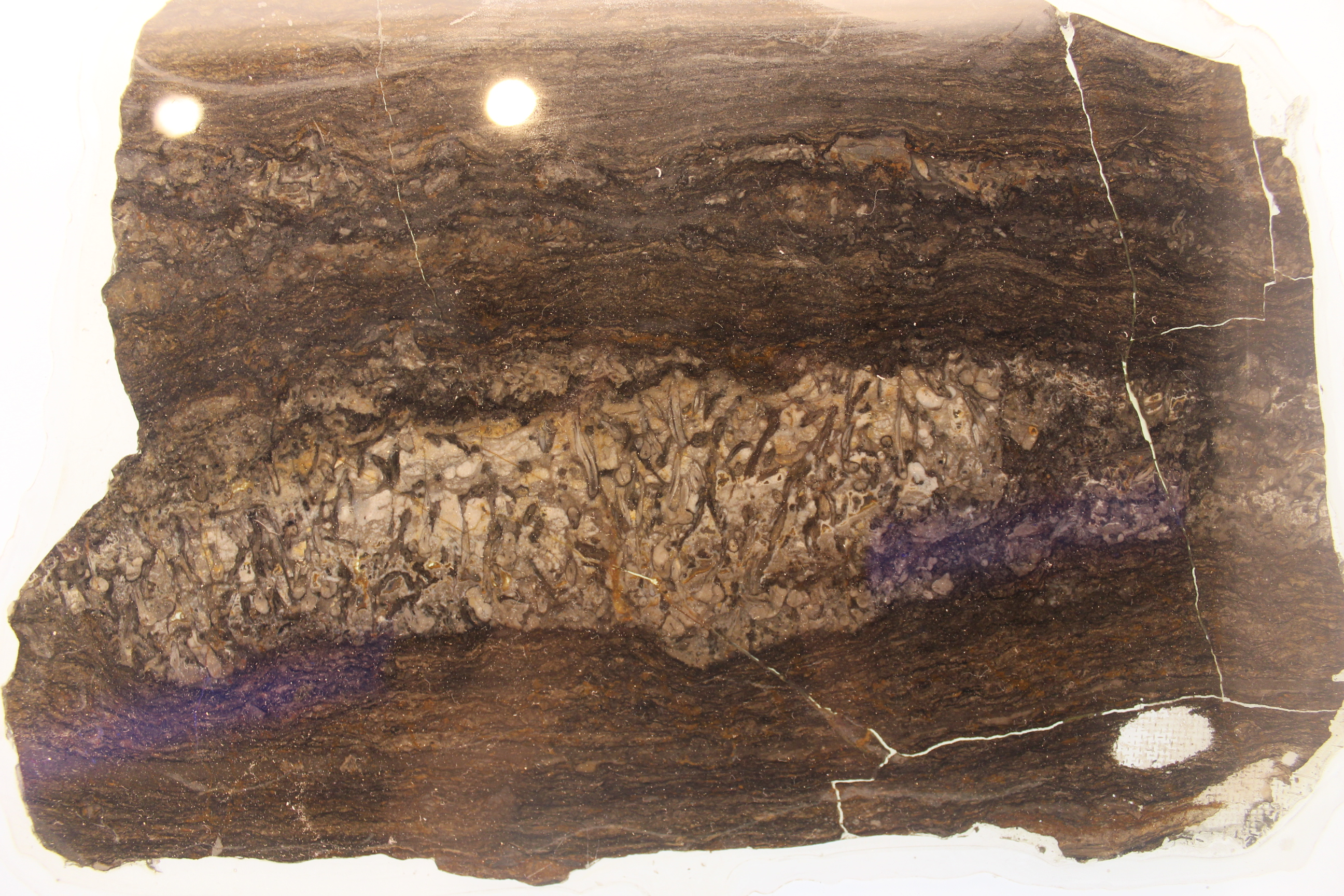
Aglaophyton major

The stems of Aglaophyton were round in cross-section, smooth, unornamented, and up to about 6mm in diameter. Kidston and Lang interpreted the plant as growing upright, to about 50 cm in height, but Edwards has re-interpreted it as having prostrate habit, with shorter aerial axes of about 15 cm height. The axes branched dichotomously, the aerial axes branching at a comparatively wide angle of up to 90°, and were terminated with elliptical, thick-walled sporangia, which when mature, opened by spiral slits, so that the sporangia appear to be spiral in form. Sporangia contained many identical spores (isospores) bearing trilete marks. The spores may therefore be interpreted as meiospores, the product of meiotic divisions, and thus the plants described by Edwards and by Kidston and Lang were diploid, sporophytes. The plant was originally interpreted as a tracheophyte, because the stem has a simple central vascular cylinder or protostele, but more recent interpretations in the light of additional data indicated that Rhynia major had water-conducting tissue lacking the secondary thickening bars seen in the xylem of Rhynia gwynne-vaughanii, more like the water-conducting system (hydrome) of moss sporophytes. Edwards reinterpreted the species as non-vascular plant and renamed it Aglaophyton major.

Aglaophyton is among the first plants known to have had a mycorrhizal relationship with fungi, which formed arbuscules in a well-defined zone in the cortex of its stems. Aglaophyton lacked roots, and like other rootless land plants of the Silurian and early Devonian may have relied on mycorrhizal fungi for acquisition of water and nutrients from the soil.

The male gametophyte of the species has been formally described, which was assigned to a new form taxon Lyonophyton rhyniensis, but is now properly referred to as an Aglaophyton gametophyte. The Rhynie chert bears many examples of male and female gametophytes, which are loosely similar in their construction to the sporophyte phase, down to bearing rhizoids.

== Taxonomy ==
Aglaophyton major was first described as Rhynia major by Kidston and Lang in 1920. In 1986 D.S. Edwards re-examined fossil specimens and reported that they did not contain true vascular tissue, but rather conducting tissue more similar to that of bryophytes. As the diagnosis of Rhynia was that it was a vascular plant, he created a new genus, Aglaophyton, for this species. (The other species of Rhynia, R. gwynne-vaughanii, was not affected.) As Rhynia major the species had been placed in the rhyniophytes, but no alternative higher level classification was proposed for the new genus.

=== Phylogeny ===
In 2004, Crane et al. published a cladogram for the polysporangiophytes which places Aglaophyton as a sister of the vascular plants (tracheophytes), with the Horneophytopsida being sister to both. The basis of the cladogram is that Aglaophyton has more developed conducting tissue than the Horneophytopsida, but does not have true vascular tissue.

- polysporangiophytes
  - † Horneophytopsida (Caia, Horneophyton, Tortilicaulis)
  - - † Aglaophyton
    - tracheophytes
