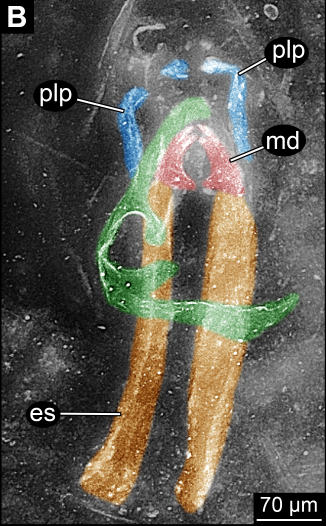
- Specimen of Rhyniognatha

Scientific classification
- Kingdom: Animalia
- Phylum: Arthropoda
- Genus: †Rhyniognatha; Tillyard, 1928
- Species: †R. hirsti

Binomial name
- †Rhyniognatha hirsti Tillyard, 1928

= Rhyniognatha =

Rhyniognatha Temporal range: Early Devonian, 400 Ma

Extinct genus of insects

Rhyniognatha is an extinct genus of arthropod of disputed placement. It has been considered in some analyses as the oldest insect known, as well as possibly being a flying insect. Rhyniognatha is known from a partial head with preserved mouthparts from the Early Devonian aged Rhynie chert around 400 million years ago, when Earth’s first terrestrial ecosystems were being formed. The type, and only species is R. hirsti, which was named and described in 1928. Other analyses have interpreted the specimen as a myriapod.

== Evidence ==
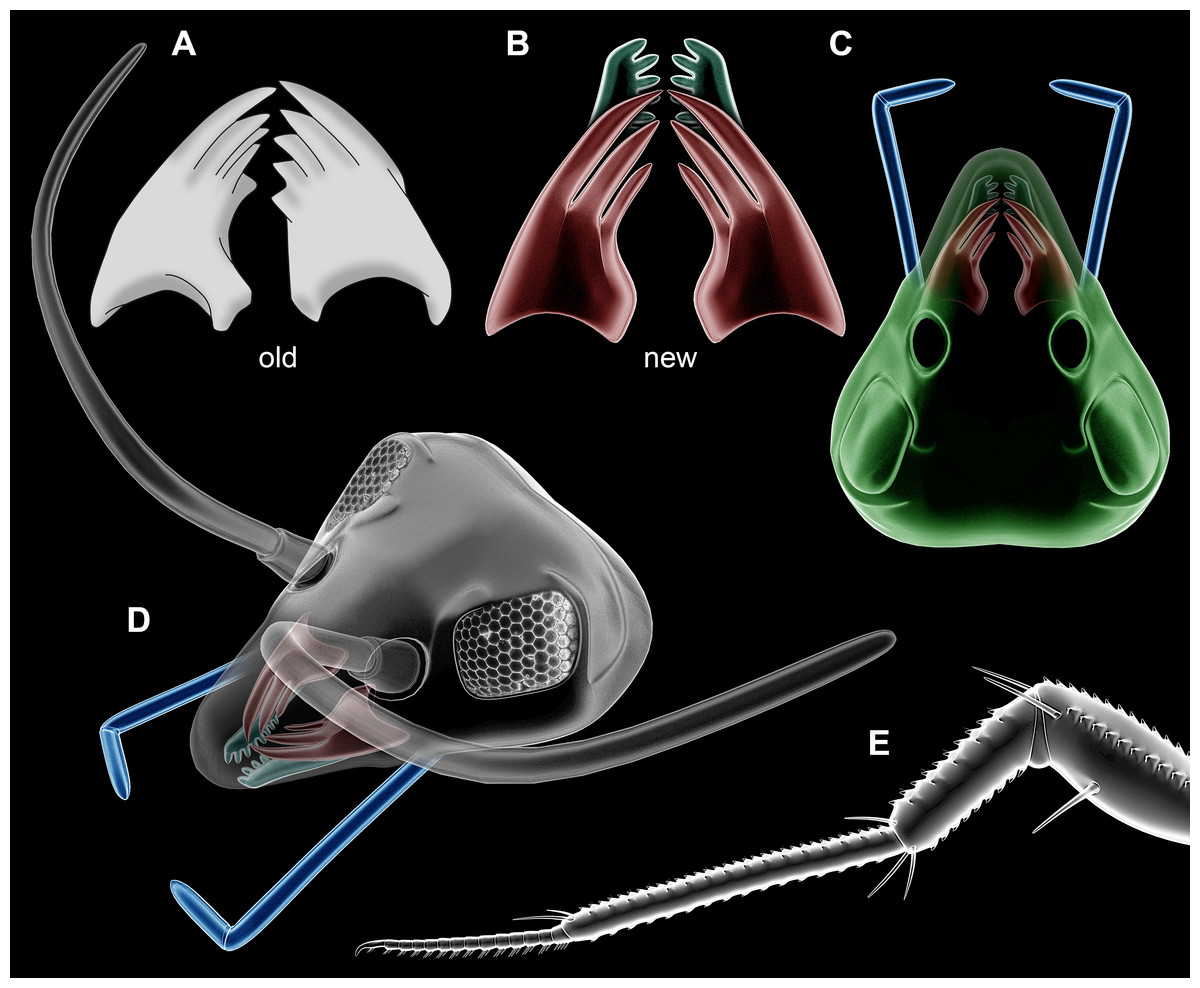
Reconstruction of the head as a centipede, with the leg of a scutigeromorph

The head part of a specimen, preserved in a fragment of Rhynie Chert, was collected in 1919 by the Reverend W. Cran, who provided it to Arthur Stanley Hirst, Samarendra Maulik and D.J. Scourfield. Hirst and Maulik published a report in 1926; in it they described Rhyniella praecursor, which is now known to be a springtail. Several other pieces, including the Rhyniognatha head, were also described as "supposed larval insect" though yet unnamed. The specimen was named as Rhyniognatha hirsti in 1928 by entomologist Robin J. Tillyard. It was later donated by D.J. Scourfield to the Natural History Museum in London where it is currently displayed on a microscope slide. In 2004 Michael S. Engel and David A. Grimaldi (2004) analyzed Rhyniognatha hirsti's mouthparts, and came to the conclusion that Rhyniognatha likely had wings, as they determined the mouthparts resembled those of a mayfly, a flying insect. Nevertheless, a detailed reanalysis by Carolin Haug & Joachim T. Haug in 2017 came to a different interpretation, concluding that the identity of Rhyniognatha hirsti as a myriapod, specifically a scutigeromorph centipede, was better supported by the available evidence, without being able to exclude an insect identity completely.
