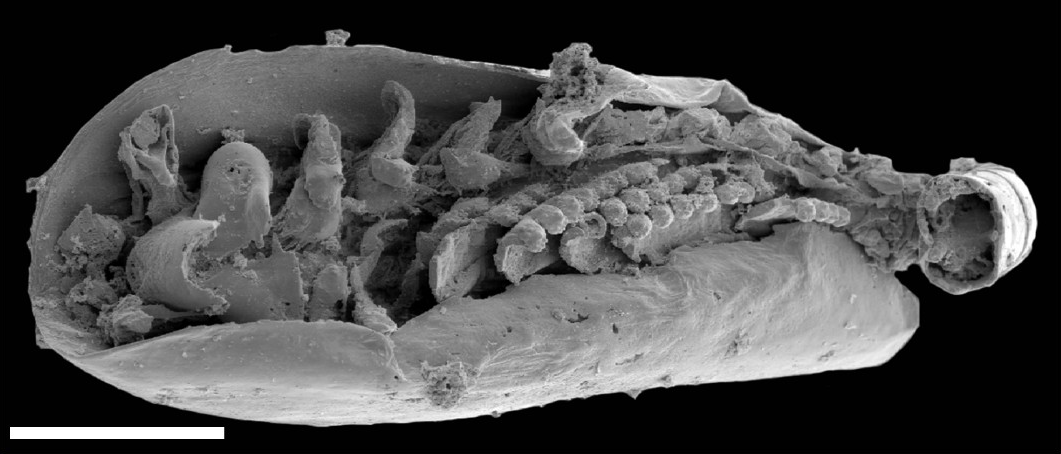
- Fossil specimen
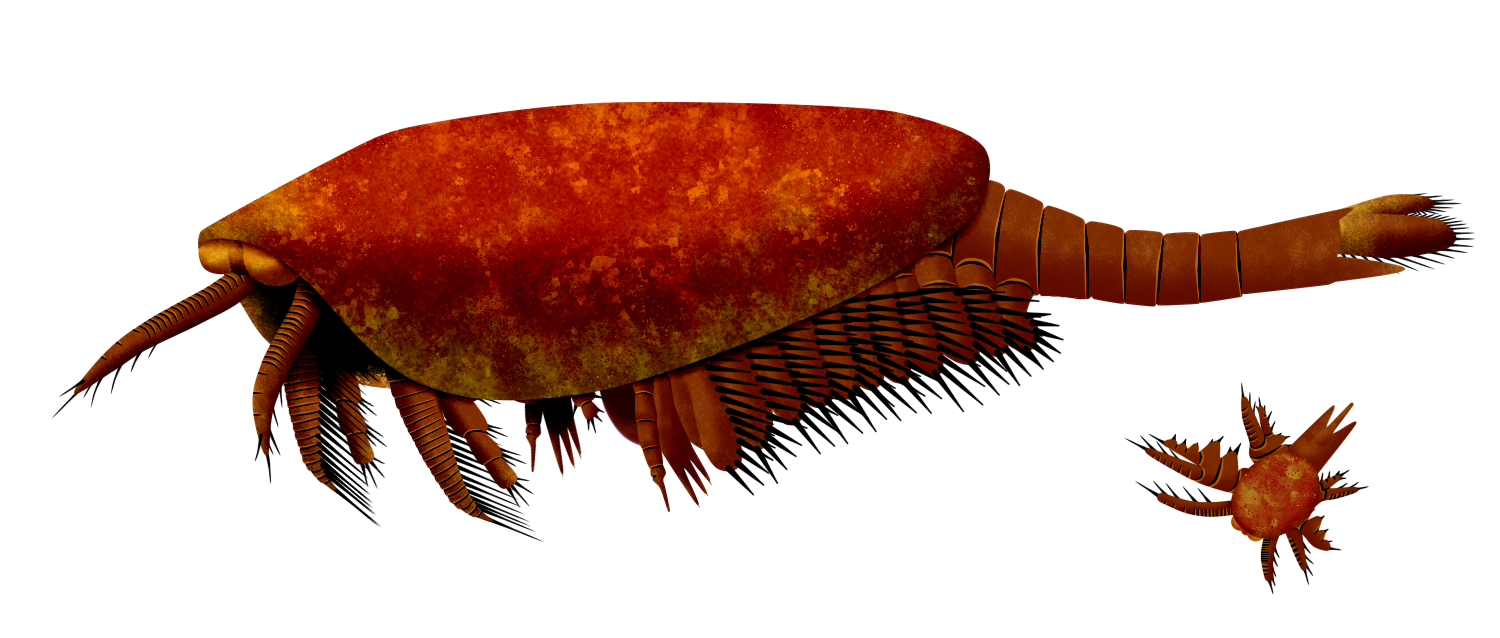
- Life restoration

Scientific classification
- Kingdom: Animalia
- Phylum: Arthropoda
- Clade: Pancrustacea
- Clade: Allotriocarida
- Class: Branchiopoda
- Genus: †Rehbachiella; Müller, 1983
- Species: †R. kinnekullensis

Binomial name
- †Rehbachiella kinnekullensis Müller, 1983

= Rehbachiella =

Rehbachiella Temporal range: Upper Cambrian

Extinct genus of crustacean

Rehbachiella is a genus of Cambrian crustacean comprising the only species Rehbachiella kinnekullensis. It is a possible branchiopod from the Orsten of Sweden.

== Description ==
Rehbachiella is roughly 1.7 mm long, with three pairs of cephalic appendages with curved spines pointing towards the mouth and eight to nine pairs of postmandibular appendages roughly identical to each other except for size and exopod length, together forming a filter apparatus. Unusually, Rehbachiella had over 30 larval stages and the most developed specimens found are still seemingly immature. Its thin carapace covers all limb-bearing segments, however there are five limbless segments extending past it, the most posterior bearing a furca alongside two protrusions that resemble undeveloped appendages. Rehbachiella has two compound eyes similar to its larval stages, as well as a large labrum. As many of its traits resemble those of Branchiopoda, it is tentatively placed as a stem-group branchiopod and may be a member of stem-Anostraca alongside Lepidocaris.

== Etymology ==
Rehbachiella is named in honour of Mrs. Helga Rehbach-Lenz, who helped with the most difficult preparation. Its specific name kinnekullensis comes from the fact the original fossils were found at Kinnekulle.

== Distribution ==
Rehbachiella is known from over 130 specimens of varying growth stages, most from Kinnekulle.
