= Rhyniella =

Rhyniella Temporal range: Early Devonian, 407 Ma

Scientific classification
- Kingdom: Animalia
- Phylum: Arthropoda
- Clade: Pancrustacea
- Class: Collembola
- Genus: †Rhyniella
- Species: †R. praecursor

Binomial name
- †Rhyniella praecursor Hirst & Maulik 1926

Extinct genus of springtails

Rhyniella is a genus of fossil springtails (Collembola) from the Rhynie chert, which lived approximately 407 Ma ago during the Early Devonian. One species has been described, Rhyniella praecursor. For some time it was believed to be the oldest hexapod.

== History ==
In 1926, Hirst and Maulik described Rhyniella praecursor based on four heads discovered in thin flakes of the Rhynie Chert, an exceptional Konservat-Lagerstätte in Aberdeenshire, Scotland. The fossils probably formed 407 Ma ago in a hot-spring environment. They suggested that R. praecursor was an insect. A few years later, Tillyard revised the material and confirmed that it was an insect, more specifically a member of Collembola, mainly based on the anatomy of the mandibles and antennae. In 1940, Scourfield described additional specimens of R. praecursor preserving more heads as well as thoraxes, legs and some abdominal segments. In 1981, Whalley and Jarzembowski described yet another specimen, consisting of a thorax with legs and the first complete abdomen. It preserved a furcula, (an appendage used by modern springtails for leaping). This confirmed that R. praecursor was a springtail. R. praecursor was thought to be the oldest known insect and hexapod for some time. However, in 2004, Engel and Grimaldi identified another fossil from the Rhynie Chert, Rhyniognatha, as the oldest "true insect" (clade Ectognatha). In fact, although springtails were historically classified as insects, they are now considered non-insect hexapods. Although later authors suggested that Rhyniognatha was maybe a myriapod, R. praecursor is no longer the only hexapod known from the early Devonian, with the basal insect Leverhulmia also known from this period.

== Description ==
R. praecursor is approximately 1.5 mm long. The head is roughly heart-shaped with the pointed end facing forward. The following head structures are preserved: a clypeus (sclerite situated at the front of the head, above the labrum), a labrum (lobe-like structure covering the mouth) covered with a few delicate hairs, ocelli (small simple eyes) on the dorsal surface of the head, a pair of four-segmented antennae, a pair of elongated mandibles with distinct molar and incisor processes, and possibly the maxillae (mouth appendages situated near the mandibles). The collophore (ventral tube-like appendage of the abdomen) and furcula (another ventral appendage) are characteristics of springtails. They can be observed in R. praecursor. The furcula is used by modern springtails to escape predators by jumping. Thus, Dunlop and Garwood suggested that R. praecursor had predators such as trigonotarbids, harvestmen and centipedes. It was maybe a mycophage or a detritivore.
