= Horneophytopsida =

Horneophytopsida Temporal range: Late Silurian–Early Devonian
- Reconstruction of Horneophyton lignieri

Scientific classification
- Kingdom: Plantae
- Clade: Embryophytes
- Clade: Polysporangiophytes
- Class: †Horneophytopsida

Synonyms
- Langiophytophyta Doweld 2001

Extinct class of leafless plants

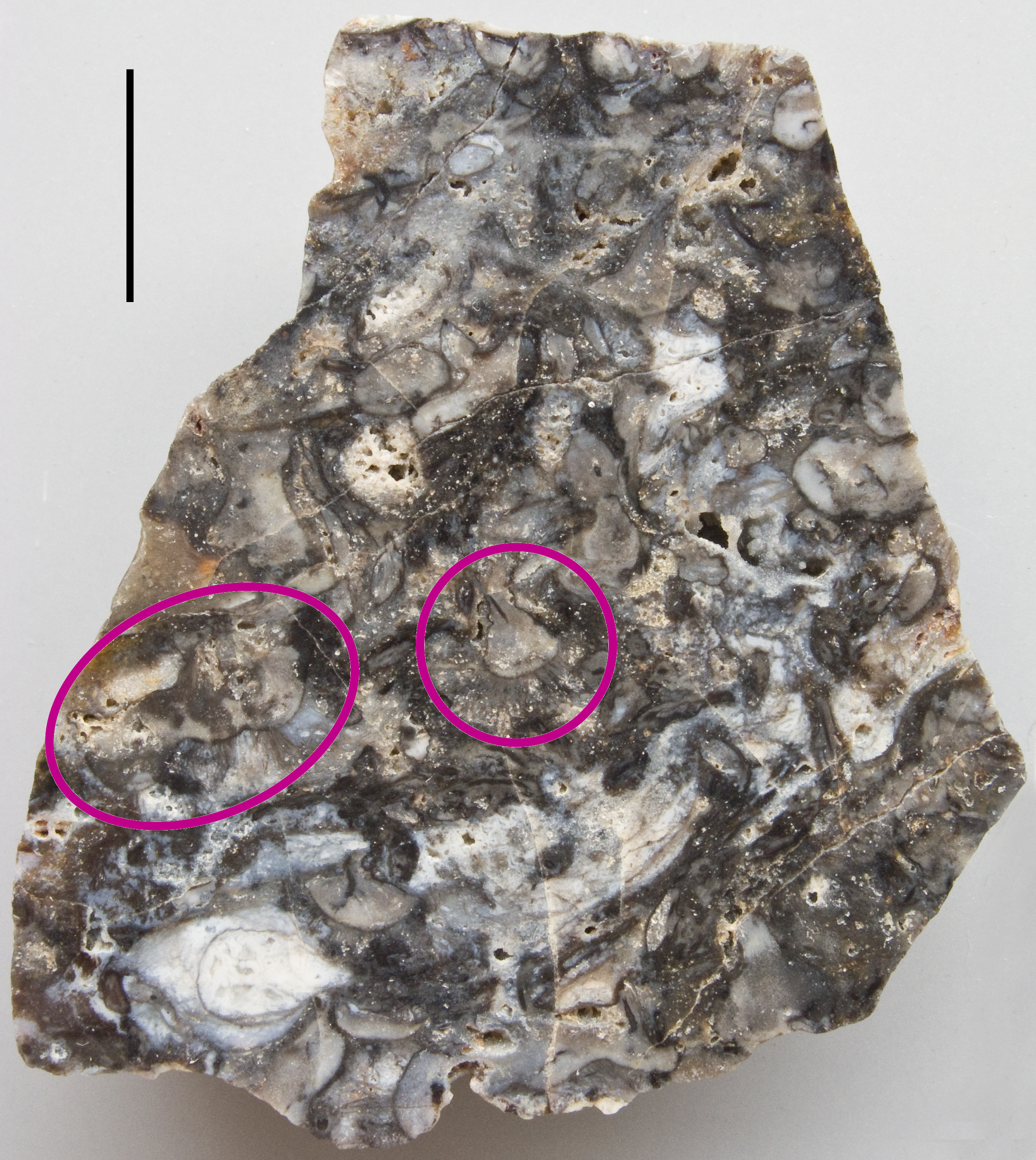
Horneophyton corms found in the Rhynie chert; scale bar is 1 cm.

The Horneophytopsida, informally called horneophytes, are a class of extinct plants which consisted of branched stems without leaves, true roots or vascular tissue, found from the Late Silurian to the Early Devonian (around 430 to 390 million years ago). They are the simplest known polysporangiophytes, i.e. plants with sporophytes bearing many spore-forming organs (sporangia) on branched stems. They were formerly classified among the rhyniophytes, but it was later found that some of the original members of the group had simple vascular tissue and others did not. The group has also been treated as the division Horneophyta.

In 2004, Crane et al. published a cladogram for the polysporangiophytes in which the Horneophytopsida are shown as the sister group of all other polysporangiophytes. One other former rhyniophyte, Aglaophyton, is also placed outside the tracheophyte clade, as it did not possess true vascular tissue (in particular did not have tracheids), although its conducting tissue is more complex than that of the Horneophytopsida.

== Phylogeny ==
Partial cladogram by Crane, Herendeen & Friis 2004, with emphasis on horneophytes.

- polysporangiophytes
  - Horneophytopsida
    - Tortilicaulis
    - - Caia
      - Horneophyton
  - - Aglaophyton
    - Tracheophyta

(See the Polysporangiophyte article for the expanded cladogram.)

== Genera ==
Genera that have been placed in the horneophytes include:

- †Caia Fanning, Edwards & Richardson (1990)
- †Horneophyton Barghoorn & Darrah (1938) (Hornea Kidston & Lang (1920) non Baker (1877); Langiophyton Remy & Hass (1991) form taxon – female gametophyte)
- †Tortilicaulis Edwards (1979)

Other sources place only Horneophyton in this group, treating Caia and Tortilicaulis as actual or possible rhyniophytes.
