= Rhynie chert =

Early Devonian sedimentary deposit in Scotland

Coordinates: 57°20′12″N 002°50′29″W

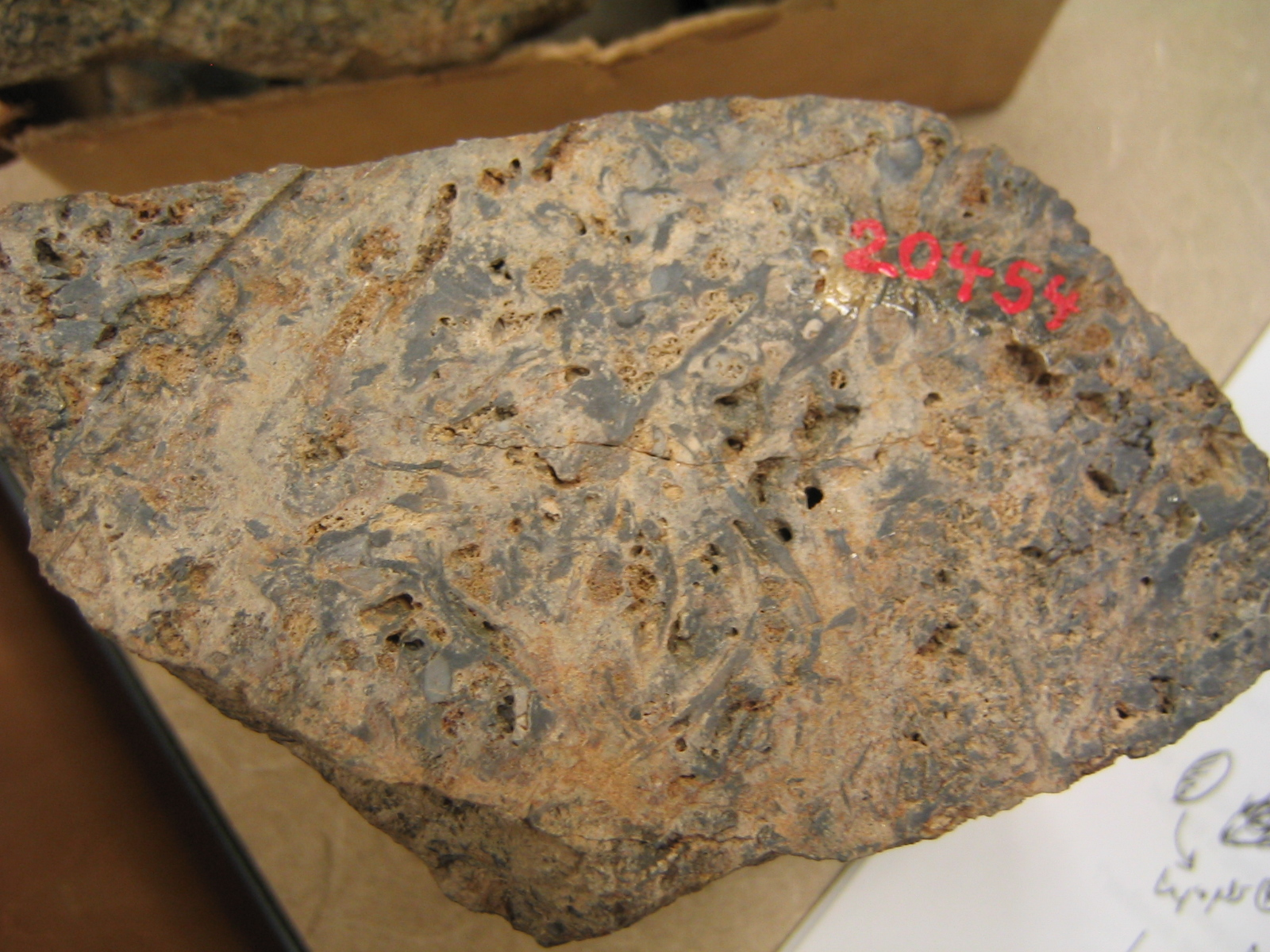
Hand sample of the Rhynie chert from Rhynie, Scotland.

The Rhynie chert is a Lower Devonian sedimentary deposit exhibiting extraordinary fossil detail or completeness (a Lagerstätte). It is exposed near the village of Rhynie, Aberdeenshire, Scotland; a second unit, the Windyfield chert, is located some 700 m away.

The Rhynie chert contains exceptionally preserved plant, fungus, lichen and animal material preserved in place by an overlying volcanic deposit. The bulk of the Devonian fossil bed consists of primitive plants (which had water-conducting cells and sporangia, but no true leaves), along with arthropods, lichens, algae and fungi.

This fossil bed is remarkable for two reasons. First, the age of the site (Pragian, Early Devonian, formed about 410 million years ago) places it at an early stage in the colonisation of land. Second, these cherts are famous for their exceptional state of ultrastructural preservation, with individual cell walls easily visible in polished specimens. Stomata have been counted and lignin remnants detected in the plant material, and the breathing apparatus of trigonotarbids—of the class Arachnida—(known as book lungs) can be seen in cross-sections. Fungal hyphae can be seen entering plant material, acting as decomposers and mycorrhizal symbionts.

== Location ==
The bed is under at least 1 metre of overburden, in a small field near the village of Rhynie, so is effectively inaccessible to collectors; besides which, the site is a Site of Special Scientific Interest. A second unit, the Windyfield chert, is some 700 m from the Rhynie. The Rhynie chert extends for at least 80 m along strike and 90 m down-dip.

== History of research ==
The chert was discovered by William Mackie while mapping the western margin of the Rhynie basin in 1910–1913. Trenches were cut into the chert at the end of this period, and Robert Kidston and William Henry Lang worked furiously to describe the plant fossils between 1917 and 1921. The arthropods were examined soon afterwards by different workers. Interest in the chert then waned until the field was reinvigorated by Alexander Geoffrey Lyon in the late 1950s, and new material was collected by further trenching from 1963 to 1971. Since 1980, the chert has been examined by the University of Münster, and from 1987 by Aberdeen University, whose researchers confirmed that the chert was indeed produced in a hot spring setting. Cores, allowing an insight into the evolution of the chert over time, were drilled in 1988 and 1997, accompanied by further trenching efforts, which unearthed the Windyfield chert.

Until recently, the Rhynie chert was the only such deposit known from the geological record, although recent work has turned up other localities from different time periods and continents.

== Conditions of formation ==
The chert was formed when silica-rich water from volcanic springs rose rapidly and petrified the early terrestrial ecosystem, in situ and almost instantaneously, in much the same fashion that organisms are petrified by hot springs today - although the astounding fidelity of preservation has not been found in recent deposits. Hot springs, with temperatures between 90 and 120 °C (194 and 248 °F), were active in a number of episodes; the water had probably cooled to under 30 °C (86 °F) before it reached the fossilised organisms. Their activity is preserved in 53 beds, 80 mm (3 in) thick on average, over a 35.41 m (116.17 ft) sequence, interbedded with sands, shales and tuffs - which speak of local volcanic activity. Deposition was very rapid. The fluids originated from a shallowly dipping extensional fault system to the west, which bounded an extensional half-graben.

Fossils were formed as silica formed in the hot springs themselves; when silica-rich water flooded the surrounding areas; and when it permeated into the surrounding soil. The texture of the sinter formed resemble those found today in freshwater streams at Yellowstone which are typically alkaline (pH 8.7) and tepid 20 to 28 °C (68 to 82 °F). The springs were periodically active, and flowed into an alluvial plain containing small lakes. By analogy with Yellowstone, the chert itself probably formed in a marshy area towards the latter end of the extent of outwash from the springs. Living vegetation covered around 55% of the land area, with litter covering 30% and the remaining 15% of the ground being bare. A braided river flowing to the north periodically deposited the sandy layers found in cores when it flooded its banks.

Sedimentary textures which appear to have formed in the hydrothermal vents themselves are preserved with a brecciated texture; "geyserite", a sediment with a botryoidal form reminiscent of modern vent margins, is also found. Spores collected from within surrounding rocks had been heated to different degrees, implying a complex history of local heating by volcanic processes.

== Preservation ==
=== Plants ===
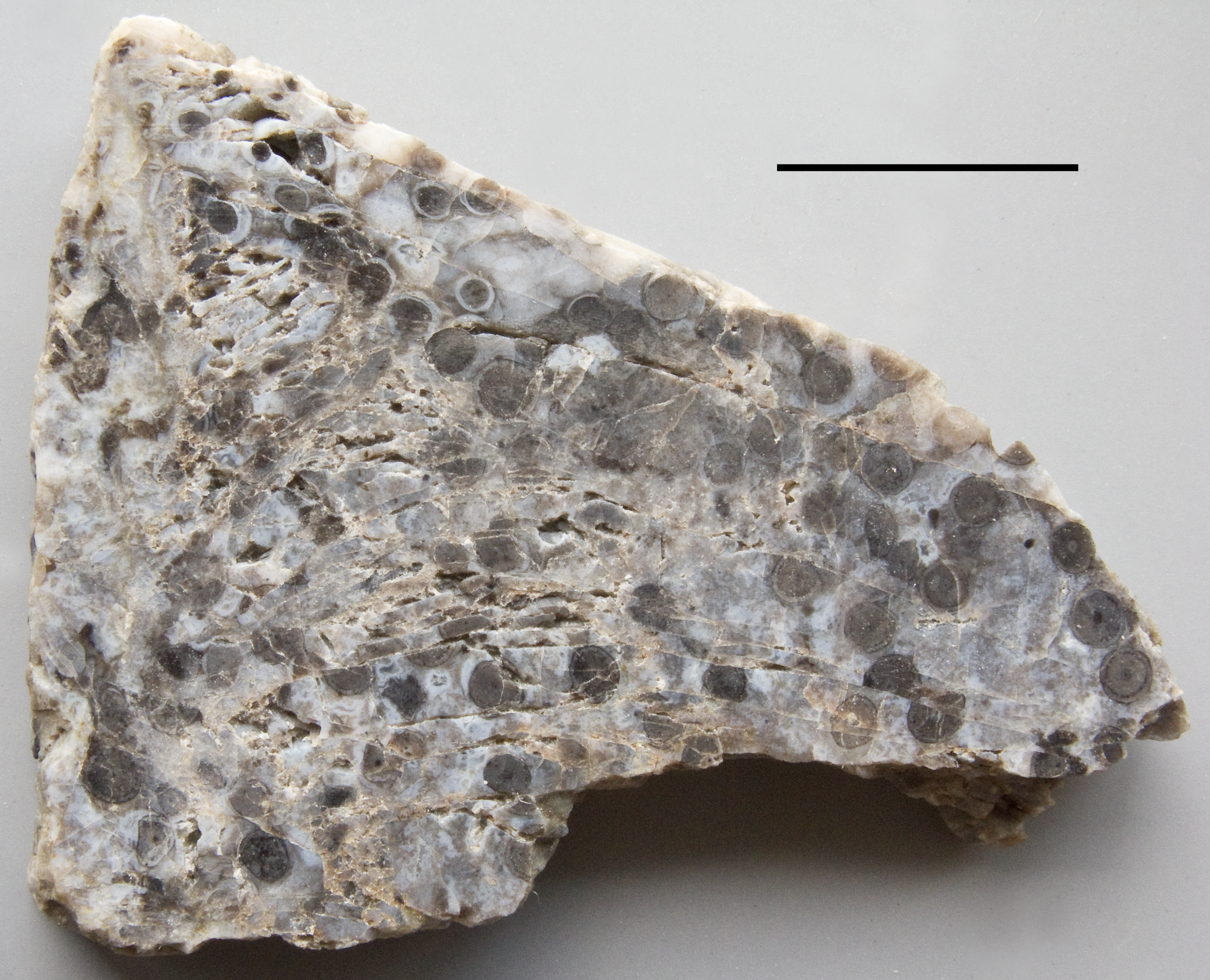
Surface view of a polished piece of Rhynie chert showing many cross-sections of Rhynia stems (axes). Scale bar is 1 cm.

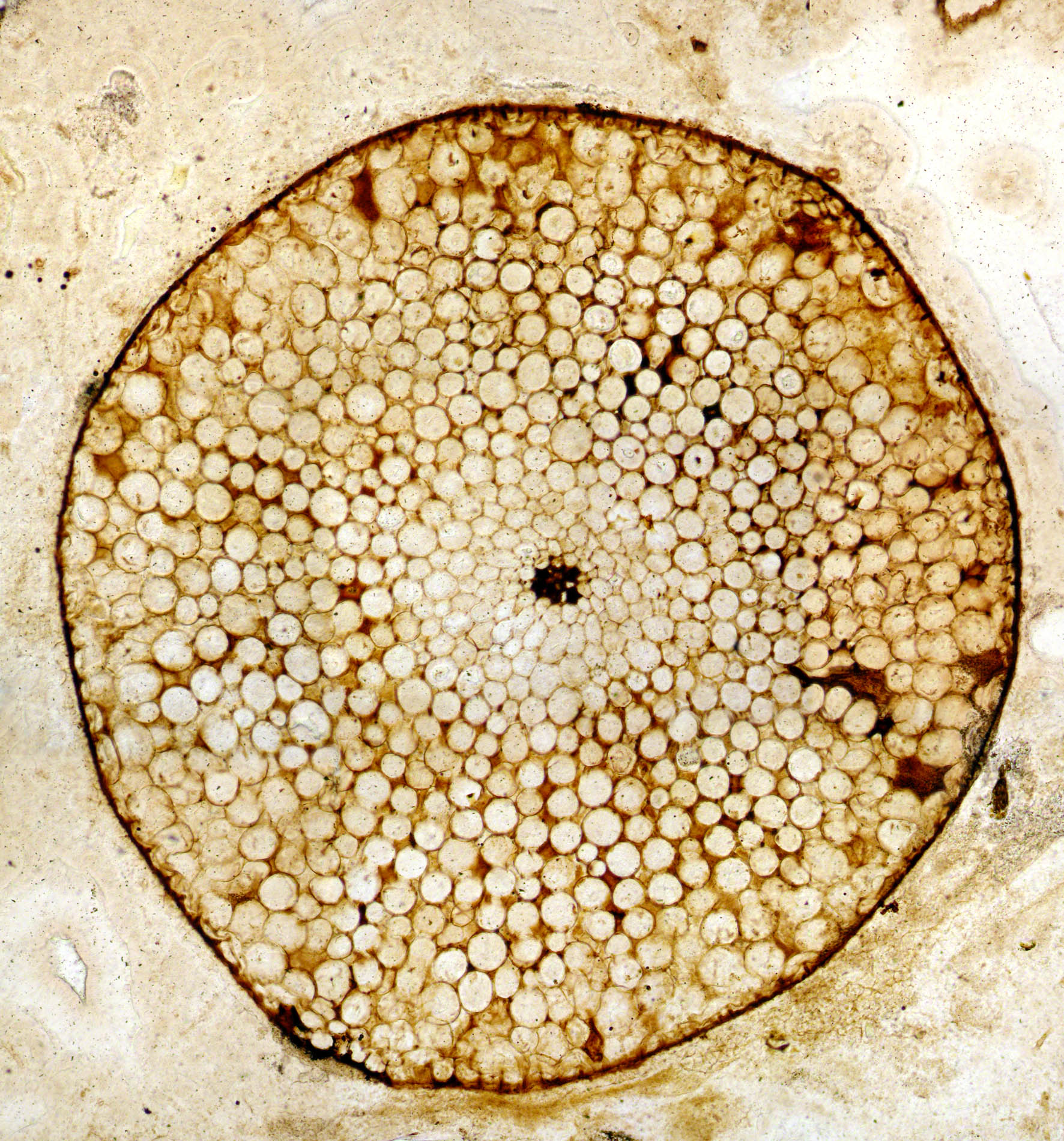
Thin section of a piece of Rhynie chert viewed by transmitted light showing the cross-section of a stem of Rhynia

The preservation of plants varies from perfect three-dimensional cellular permineralisation to flattened charcoal films. On occasion, plants may have their vertical axes preserved in growth position, with rhizoids still attached to rhizomes; even the plant litter is preserved.

Plants were only found on the land - none lived in the water of lakes or hot springs. Rhynia typically grew on sandy surfaces, and is often preserved there in life position; Horneophyton grew on sinter, the sediment formed by the hot springs. These two colonisers were subsequently joined by other genera. The time between sinter deposition events was too short to allow the populations to develop to climax communities, and correspondingly early colonisers appear most frequently, pseudo-randomly, in logged sequences.

The preservation typical of Rhynie chert allows for the detailed study of plants. The presence of soft tissue, including parenchyma, is not observed elsewhere in the fossil record until the advent of amber in the Triassic. This allows the study of structures such as the air spaces behind stomata, while typical fossil records are often limited to the outer surfaces of the stomata. This evidence led paleobotanists to conclude that plants like Aglaophyton were not aquatic.

Further, as plants are preserved in situ, the study of exactly how and why the branching patterns of the early plants emerged is possible, whereas typical fossils only show that branching was present. The analysis of rhizomes and rhizoids makes it possible to discern which plants had an active water uptake system (e.g. Horneophyton), and which were likely to have colonised waterlogged surfaces (Asteroxylon). In some cases, it is possible to see different mechanisms of repairing wounds, and to deduce that they were caused by fungal or bacterial infection.

The preservation of spores attached to sporangia allows spore genera to be matched with their producers - something that is otherwise very difficult to do. The chert also allows the identification of the gametophyte phases of taxa such as Aglaophyton.

Analysis of spores shows that the flora was lacking in some elements common elsewhere at this time, likely due to its setting in a mountainous region, rather than in a lowland flood plain like most other fossil deposits. However, the spores, which are distinctive enough to permit their producing organism to be identified - are identical to those found elsewhere in "normal" environments. There is no clear-cut evidence that the plants of the Rhynie assemblage were specifically adapted to stressed environments, and it is likely that the flora in fact represents those members of the global fauna that happened to be capable of colonising and surviving a hot spring environment by virtue of fortuitous preadaptations.

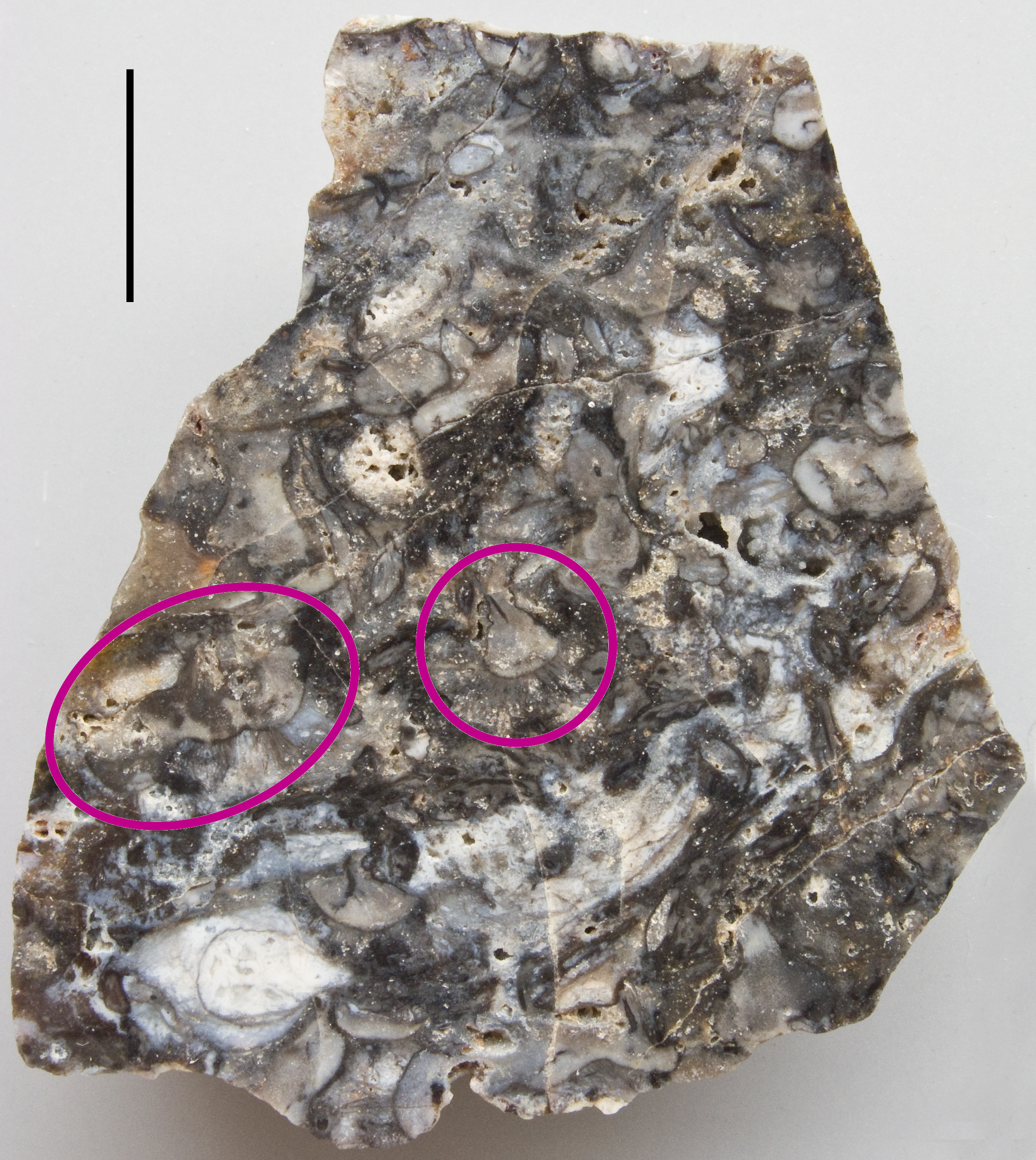
Surface view of a polished piece of Rhynie chert showing many corms/tubers of Horneophyton. Marked examples: centre – single corm with rhizoids; left – linked corms with rhizoids. Scale bar is 1 cm.

Seven land plant taxa have been identified in the Rhynie and Windyfield cherts:

- Aglaophyton
- Asteroxylon
- Horneophyton
- Nothia
- Rhynia
- Trichopherophyton
- Ventarura

Another group, Nematophytes, remains enigmatic, but may represent aquatic land plants.

=== Algae ===
Several putative chlorophytes have been discovered in the Rhynie assemblage (Mackiella and Rhynchertia). A well-preserved charophyte, Palaeonitella, which inhabited the alkaline freshwater pools towards the end of the sinter apron, has been characterized.

=== Arthropods ===
As a result of its preservation, the Rhynie chert's fossils are the most diverse non-marine fauna of its time, and the chert is studied to advance the understanding of arthropod terrestrialisation. Typical members of the Rhynie chert arthropod fauna include the crustacean Lepidocaris, the euthycarcinoid Heterocrania, the springtail Rhyniella, the possible insect Leverhulmia, the harvestman Eophalangium sheari, Acari (mites), the centipede Crussolum and trigonotarbids in the genus Palaeocharinus.

The oldest known hexapod (Rhyniella praecursor), which resembles the modern springtails, was found in the Rhynie chert, pushing dates for the origination of hexapods (a group that includes the insects) back to the Silurian period.

=== Fungi ===
Fungi known from the Rhynie chert include the chytridiomycetes, ascomycetes, oomycota (Peronosporomycetes) and glomeromycetes; indeed the only fungal groups not yet known from the Rhynie are the Zygomycota (although they may have formed lichens - see later), and the Basidiomycota, the latter of which may not even have evolved by Rhynie time.

The Chytridiomycetes, or Chytrids, are a basal group of fungi, closely related to the true fungi.

The chytrids display a range of behaviour in the Rhynie chert. Eucarpic and holocarpic forms are known - i.e. some forms grew specialised fruiting bodies while others did not show specialisation in this fashion. Saprotrophy may be present, and parasitism is common; one individual has even been found parasitising a germinating gametophyte. The fungi were aquatic, and grew in both plants and algae; they are also found preserved "loose" in the chert matrix. Their flagellate spores are preserved.

The largest organism present in Rhynie was probably a fungus, the enigmatic Prototaxites, growing as a mound a metre or more taller than anything in the community, whose isotopic composition varied like a saprotroph and whose septate pores resemble those of fungi.

=== Cyanobacteria ===
In the rare instances that cyanobacteria are found in the fossil record, their presence is usually the subject of much controversy, for their simple form is difficult to distinguish from inorganic structures such as bubbles.

However, bona fide cyanobacteria are preserved in the Rhynie chert. The aquatic organisms are thought to belong to the Oscillatoriales section on the basis of biomarker absence. The fossils are filamentous, around 3 μm in diameter, and grew on plants and the sediment itself. They occasionally form structured colonies which go on to create microbial mats. The cyanobacterium Palaeolyngbya has been recorded from the formation, despite otherwise being exclusively Precambrian.

=== Lichens ===
A new genus of lichen, Winfrenatia, has been recovered from the Rhynie chert. The lichen comprises a thallus, made of layered, aseptate hyphae; a number of depressions are formed on its top surface. Each depression contains a net of hyphae holding a sheathed cyanobacterium. The fungus appears to be related to the Zygomycetes, and the photobiont resembles the coccoid Gloeocapsa and Chroococcidiopsis.

== Paleobiota ==
=== Animals ===
Color key: Taxon / Reclassified taxon / Taxon falsely reported as present / Dubious taxon or junior synonym / Ichnotaxon / Ootaxon / Morphotaxon

Notes
Uncertain or tentative taxa are in small text
~~crossed out~~ taxa are discredited.

Animals
Genus	Species	Higher taxon	Notes	Images
Palaeocharinus	P. rhyniensis; P. tuberculatus	Trigonotarbida	Likely a predatory liquid-feeder	P. rhyniensis reconstruction
Palaeocteniza	P. crassipes	Trigonotarbida	Only fossil material comes from a moulted juvenile	
Eophalangium	E. sheari	Tetrophthalmi	Preserves oldest tracheae in fossil record	
Saccogulus	S. seldeni	Arachnida incertae sedis	Bears an unusual pharynx-like structure	
Protacarus	P. crani	Alycidae	All other mites in the Rhynie chert have been synonymised with this species	
Crussolum	C. sp	Scutigeromorpha	Too poorly preserved to assign to a species	Reconstruction of a Crussolum leg
Rhynimonstrum	R. dunlopi	Arthropoda incertae sedis	Possibly a myriapod, if so likely a millipede	
Rhyniella	R. praecursor	Collembola	Earliest known hexapod	
Rhyniognatha	R. hirsti	Myriapoda or Insecta	Affinities controversial	Specimen of Rhyniognatha
Leverhulmia	L. mariae	Myriapoda or Hexapoda	Affinities controversial	
Heterocrania	H. rhyniensis	Euthycarcinoidea	Oldest non-Cambrian euthycarcinoid	
Lepidocaris	L. rhyniensis	Branchiopoda	Only member of Lipostraca	Reconstruction of Lepidocaris
Castracollis	C. wilsonae	Branchiopoda	Stem-calmanostracan (related to tadpole shrimp)	Reconstruction of Castracollis
Ebullitiocaris	E. oviformis	Diplostraca?	Soft tissue unknown, only known from valves	
Palaeonema	P. phyticum	Enoplida	Earliest nematode in the fossil record	
Rotifera indet.	Unapplicable	Gnathifera	Undescribed	

=== Plants and Multicellular Algae ===
Plants and Algae
Genus	Species	Higher taxon	Notes	Images
Asteroxylon	A. mackiei	Drepanophycales	Infected by parasitic root fungi	Asteroxylon life restoration
Aglaophyton	A. major	Polysporangiophytes	Preserves earliest known mycorrhizal fungi	Aglaophyton reconstruction
Horneophyton	H. lignieri	Horneophytopsida	Female gametophyte also preserved, named Langiophyton	Schematic reconstruction of Horneophyton
Nothia	N. aphylla	Zosterophylls?	May have been poisonous to fend off arthropods?	Reconstruction of Nothia
Rhynia	R. gwynne-vaughanii	Rhyniophytina	Gametophyte preserved, named Remyophyton (although another form may exist)	Reconstruction of Rhynia
Trichopherophyton	T. teuchansii	Zosterophylls?	Unusually bore spines on its stems.	
Ventarura	V. lyonii	Zosterophylls?	Affinities unclear due to poor preservation.	Reconstruction of Ventarura
Zosterophylls? indet.	Unapplicable	Lycophyta	Poorly preserved and only known from one specimen, yet noticeably distinct from all other Rhynie plants	
Palaeonitella	P. cranii	Charales	Fungi preserved colonising this alga	
Charophyta indet.	Unapplicable	Streptophyta	Many Palaeonitella specimens may be juveniles of this species.	
Mackiella	M. rotundata	Ulotrichaceae	Preserves possible chloroplasts	
Rhynchertia	R. punctata	Ulotrichaceae	Some specimens preserved with zoospores inside cells	
Harpericystis	H. verecunda	Chlorophyta	Microscopic alga which forms small multicellular colonies	
Cymatiosphaera	Unapplicable	Pyramimonadales?	Not assigned to a species, may be an indeterminate chlorophyte alga.	
Pyramimonales indet?	Unapplicable	Pyramimonadophyceae	Similar to the phycoma of extant Pterosperma, may be an indeterminate chlorophyte alga.	
Anechosoma	A. oblongum	Chlorophyta or Glaucophyta	Occasionally infected by Rhyniovexator, a chytrid or aphelid	
Hagenococcus	H. aggregatus	Viridiplantae incertae sedis	Preserved in numerous different colony types	
Xanthophyta indet.	Unapplicable	Ochrophytina	First definitive xanthophyte in the fossil record?	
Phaeophyceae indet?	Unapplicable	Ochrophytina	Possible oldest brown alga in the fossil record	
Characrhynium	C. amoenum	Diaphoretickes incertae sedis	Resembles both modern Characium and Characiopsis	

=== Fungi ===
Fungi
Genus	Species	Higher taxon	Notes	Images
Archaeosporites	A. rhyniensis	Archaeosporaceae	Incredibly similar to Archaeospora	
Brijax	B. amictus	Chytridiomycota	Placement within the group uncertain, colonises glomeromycote spores	
Cultoraquaticus	C. trewini	Chytridiomycota	Epibiotic on enigmatic round structures	
Frankbaronia	F. polyspora; F. velata	Oomycetes?	Second known oomycete fossil	
Globicultrix	G. nugax	Chytridiomycota	Is itself a parasite of larger fungal spores	
Glomites	G. sporocarpoides; G. rhyniensis	Glomerales	Formed mycorrhizae in various land plants	
Hassiella	H. monospora	Oomycetes	First known oomycete fossil	
Helmutella	H. devonica	Fungi incertae sedis	Resembles Carboniferous "sporocarps"	
Illmanomyces	I. corniger	Chytridiomycota	Grows on various other spores, fungal matter, plants and algae.	
Krispiromyces	K. discoides	Endochytriaceae	Parasite of Palaeonitella, grows inside cells	
Kryphiomyces	K. catenulatus	Fungi incertae sedis	Preserved inside a glomeromycote spore	
Lyonomyces	L. pyriformis	Fungi incertae sedis	Grows on cells of Palaeonitella	
Milleromyces	M. rhyniensis	Endochytriaceae?	Grows on cells of Palaeonitella	
Mycocarpon	M. rhyniense	Fungi incertae sedis	Earliest sporocarp fossil known	
Mycokidstonia	M. sphaerialoides	Ambisporaceae	Previously thought to be an ascomycete	
Nimbosphaera	N. rothwellii	Chytridiomycota	Likely zoosporangia of chytrids	
Palaeoendogone	P. gwynne-vaughaniae	Mucoromycotina	Endophyte of Horneophyton	
Palaeoglomus	P. boullardii	Glomeromycota	Endophyte of Horneophyton	
Palaeomyces	P. agglomeratus; P. asteroxyli; P. gordonii; P. horneae; P. simpsoni	Mucoromycota	Grows on/within land plant stems	
Paleopyrenomycites	P. devonicus	Sordariomycetes	Also found growing on Asteroxylon	
Palaeozoosporites	P. renaultii	Chytridiomycota?	Root parasite of Asteroxylon	
Paleoblastocladia	P. milleri	Blastocladiomycota	Oldest blastoclad fungus known, has sexual reproduction	
Perexiflasca	P. tayloriana; P. ventricosa	Chytridiomycota	Grew on land plant remains	
Potteromyces	P. asteroxylicola	Ascomycota incertae sedis	Plant pathogen of Asteroxylon	
Prototaxites	P. taiti	Fungi incertae sedis	Affinities debated in a 2026 paper	
Retesporangicus	R. lyonii	Blastocladiomycota incertae sedis	Earliest known fungus with multiple sporangia per hyphae	
Rhizophidites	R. matryoshkae; R. shutae	Chytridiomycota	Grew within Horneophyton and glomeromycote spores	
Rhyniomycelium	R. endoconidiarum	Ascomycota?	Oldest fossil evidence of endoconidia in fungi.	
Rhyniovexator	R. penetrans	Chytridiomycota or Aphelida	Parasitic on unicellular algae	
Scepasmatocarpion	S. fenestrulatum	Fungi incertae sedis	One of the oldest hyphal investments found	
Scutellosporites	S. devonicus	Gigasporaceae	Bears a germination shield, a feature shared only with the extant Scutellospora	
Trewinomyces	T. annulifer	Fungi incertae sedis	Grew on decaying plant matter	
Veterisphaera	V. dumosa	Fungi incertae sedis	Has a two-layered hyphal mantle	
Windipila	W. spinifera; W. wimmervoecksii; W. pumila	Fungi incertae sedis (Glomeromycota?)	Bears unusual spines and projections from the mantle	
Zwergimyces	Z. vestitus	Fungi incertae sedis	Only "mantled" fungal fossil with preserved development	

=== Other taxa ===
Other taxa
Genus	Species	Higher taxon	Notes	Images
Palaeoleptochlamys	P. hassi	Arcellinida	One of the earliest known testate amoebae	
Triskelia	T. scotlandica	Eukaryota incertae sedis	Either a green algae or a fungus.	
Rhyniotaenium	R. velatum	Mesotaeniaceae	Likely a saccoderm desmid	
Anechosoma	A. oblonga	Archaeplastida incertae sedis	Unclear whether it belongs to Glaucophyta or Chlorophyta, hosts the fungus Rhyniovexator	
Glaphyrobalantium	G. hueberi	incertae sedis	May either be a cyanobacterium or coccoid alga?	
Langiella	L. scourfieldii	Hapalosiphonaceae	Synonymised with Kidstonia and Rhyniella	
Archaeothrix	A. contexta; A. oscillatoriformis	Oscillatoriales	Colonised lesions on Aglaophyton	
Rhyniococcus	R. uniformis	Chroococcaceae	Forms sheets one cell thick, resembles modern Merismopedia	
Eoentophysalis	E. sp.	Entophysalidaceae	Otherwise only known from the Proterozoic	
Rhyniosarcina	R. devonica	Chroococcales	Forms sarcinoid colonial structures	
Palaeolyngbya	P. kerpii	Oscillatoriaceae	Other species within the genus are known from the Precambrian	Line drawing reconstruction of Palaeolyngbya helva
Croftalania	C. venusta	Oscillatoriales incertae sedis	Common mat-forming cyanobacterium	
Rhyniotaxillus	R. devonicus; R. minutulus	Cyanobacteria incertae sedis	Small coccoid cyanobacteria, resembles Entophysalis	
Rhystigonema	R. obscurum	Stigonemataceae	May be assignable to Stigonema itself	
Winfrenatia	W. reticulata	Zygomycota, Chroococcaceae	Lichen composed of a fungus, coccoid cyanobacterium and filamentous cyanobacterium	Reconstructed transverse view of Winfrenatia
Nematoplexus	N. rhyniensis	Nematophyta	Member of the enigmatic nematophytes	
Nematothallus	N. sp	Nematophyta	Only known from one specimen, previously only known from compressions	

== Interactions ==
The Rhynie chert, by preserving a snapshot of an ecosystem in situ in high fidelity, gives a unique opportunity to observe interactions between species and kingdoms. There is evidence of parasitic behaviour by fungi on algae Palaeonitella, provoking a hypertrophic response. Herbivory is also evident, judging by boring and piercing wounds in various states of repair, and the mouthparts of arthropods. In addition, a fossil enoplid nematode named Palaeonema parasitised Aglaophyton plants, with eggs, juveniles and adults all recorded from within their stomatal chambers.

Coprolites - fossilised droppings - give a useful insight of what animals ate, even if the animals cannot be identified. Coprolites found in the Rhynie chert are typically between 0.5 and 3 mm in size, and contain a variety of contents. Analysis of coprolites allows the identification of different feeding modes, including detritovory and herbivory; some coprolites are so densely packed with spores that it is possible that these made up a substantial proportion of some organisms' diets. The trigonotarbid species found in the deposit were predators: it is possible for many of the arthropods to deduce their likely ecological role, however, it is unclear if this community was representative of a typical terrestrial arthropod community of the time, or rather was specific to the stressed Rhynie environment.

Plants responded to fungal colonisation in different ways, depending on the fungus. The rhizoids of Nothia displayed three responses to fungal infestation: the hyphae of some (mutualistic) colonists were encased by plant cell walls; other (parasitic) fungi were met with typical host responses of increased rhizome cell size; while yet other fungi solicited an increase in thickness and pigmentation of cell walls. Once inside a plant cell, fungi produced spores, which are found in decaying plant cells; the cells may have decayed as a defence mechanism to prevent the fungi from spreading.

Fungal interactions are known to promote speciation in modern plants, and presumably also affected Devonian diversity by providing a selection pressure.

Mycorrhizae are also found in the Rhynie chert.

== See also ==
- Evolutionary history of plants
- Geology of Scotland
