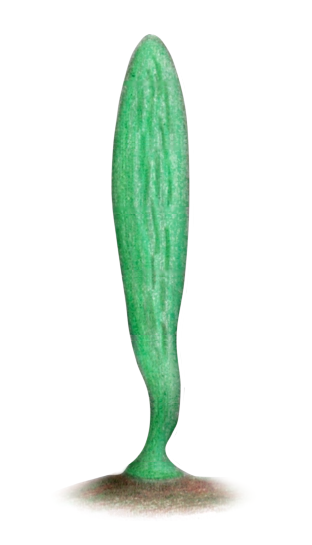
- Grandilingulata qianxiensis

Scientific classification
- Domain: Eukaryota
- (unranked): incertae sedis
- Genus: †Grandilingulata; Chen et al, 2023
- Species: †G. qianxiensis

Binomial name
- †Grandilingulata qianxiensis Chen et al, 2023

= Grandilingulata =

Grandilingulata Temporal range: Calymmian, 1590 Ma

Genus of extinct enigmatic organism

Grandilingulata is a Calymmian organism, found in the Gaoyuzhuang Formation of China. It has been tentatively placed inside Eukaryota due to its complexity and size, alongside other fossils from the formation.

== Description ==
Grandilingulata is a tongue-shaped fossil with gently curved sides, growing up to 30 cm in length and 8 cm in width. As it dates from the earliest Mesoproterozoic, its exact classification is unknown beyond a probable eukaryotic affinity. It is known from twelve specimens, two from the uppermost section and ten from the middle section of the Gaoyuzhuang Formation.

== Etymology ==
The genus name Grandilingulata means "large tongue", referring both to its tongue-like shape and its large size for organisms of the time period. The specific name qianxiensis refers to the location of a newly discovered fossiliferous location in Qianxi County, Hebei.
