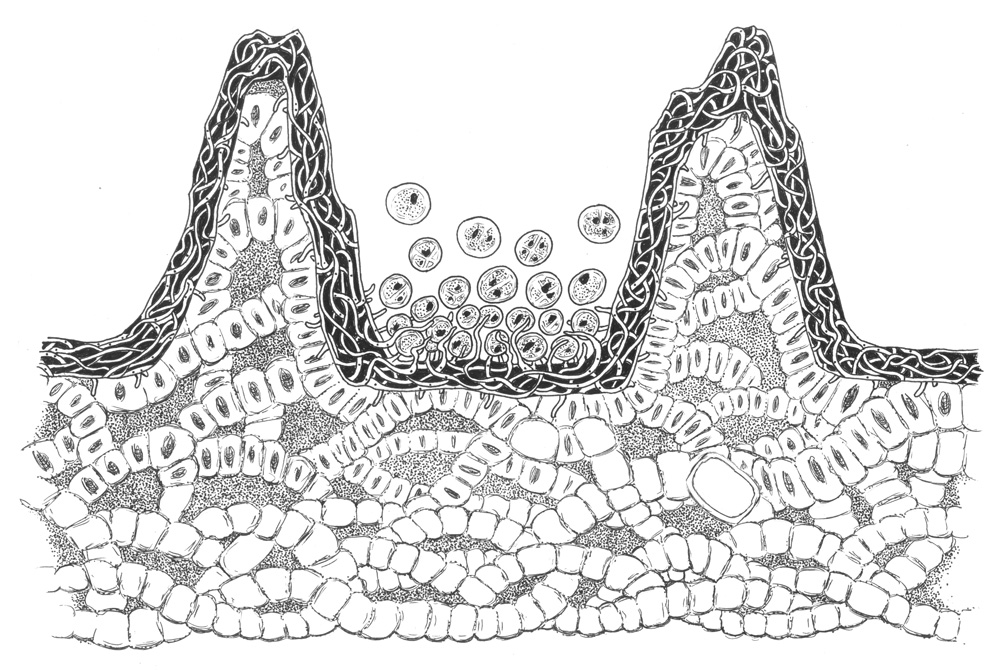
- Reconstruction of the transverse view of Winfrenatia

Scientific classification
- Kingdom: Fungi
- Genus: Winfrenatia; T.N.Taylor, Hass & Kerp (1997)
- Species: †W. reticulata

Binomial name
- †Winfrenatia reticulata T.N.Taylor, Hass & Kerp (1997)

= Winfrenatia =

Single-species fossil lichen genus

Winfrenatia is a genus that contains the oldest-known terrestrial lichen, occurring in fossils preserved in the lower Devonian Rhynie chert. The genus contains the single species Winfrenatia reticulata, named for the texture of its surface. Both the species and the genus were described in 1997.

It comprises a thallus, made of layered, aseptate hyphae, with a number of depressions on its top surface. Each depression contains a net of hyphae holding a sheathed cyanobacterium. The fungus appears to be related to the Zygomycetes, and the photosynthetic partner of photobiont resembles the coccoid cyanobacteria Gloeocapsa and Chroococcidiopsis.

== Three-component symbiosis ==
Re-examination of thin sections from the Rhynie chert shows that Winfrenatia is more intricate than the standard two-partner lichen model. The bulk of its ridged thallus is made up of empty, mucilage-lined sheaths that once housed a filamentous cyanobacterium resembling modern Nostocales; these sheaths create the three-dimensional pockets previously thought to be fungal tissue. Within the floor of each pocket lie clusters of spherical cyanobacterial cells, while true fungal hyphae occur mainly at the base, weaving around and sometimes enclosing these coccoid cells. This architecture indicates that the fungus interacts chiefly with the coccoid partner, whereas the filamentous cyanobacterium supplies the structural "scaffolding" of the thallus.

Because two distinct cyanobacteria share the association with a single fungus, Winfrenatia represents an Early Devonian example of a tripartite (three-membered) symbiosis rather than a conventional lichen. No living lichen combines a glomeromycete-like fungus with both filamentous and coccoid cyanobacteria, making this fossil partnership unique. The authors suggest that such a collaboration could have aided early soil formation by coupling photosynthesis, nitrogen fixation and fungal nutrient uptake in one organism, thereby helping pioneer communities tolerate the intermittent drought and temperature swings inferred for the Rhynie hot spring environment.
