= Trichopherophyton =

Trichopherophyton Temporal range: Pragian

Scientific classification
- Kingdom: Plantae
- Clade: Tracheophytes
- Clade: Lycophytes
- Plesion: †Zosterophylls (?)
- Genus: †Trichopherophyton; A.G.Lyon & D.Edwards (1991)

Species
- T. teuchansii A.G.Lyon & D.Edwards (1991)

Extinct genus of spore-bearing plants

Trichopherophyton is a genus of extinct vascular plants of the Early Devonian (Pragian, around 410 million years ago). Fossils were found in the Rhynie chert, Scotland. The remains are very fragmentary, but the plant appears to be related to the zosterophylls.

== Description ==
Trichopherophyton was described from very fragmentary fossils found in the Rhynie chert, Rhynie, Scotland, which is of Early Devonian, specifically Pragian, age. The overall growth habit of the plant is difficult to construct. Some stems reached 2.5 mm in diameter, but their height is unknown; branching was possibly pseudomonopodial (i.e. one arm of a dichotomous branch continued as a 'main' stem). Uniquely among the Rhynie chert plants, aerial stems bore rigid hairs or spines made up of single cells. Stems appear to have grown from coiled (circinnate) tips, in a manner similar to modern ferns. Stems contained circular exarch xylem strands with tracheids showing both annular and spiral thickening. The upright spore-forming organs or sporangia were made up of two 'valves', the larger one facing away from the stem and bearing hairs, the smaller facing towards the stem and apparently not bearing hairs. The precise arrangement of the sporangia on the stems cannot be determined; there may have been zones of sporangia. Spores were released through a slit opening along the margins of the two valves of a sporangium. The trilete spores were about 55 μm in diameter.

Hairless stems bearing rhizoids but with a similar anatomy to the aerial stems are possibly the rhizomes of Trichopherophyton. Some actually grow through stems bearing hairs.

== Phylogeny ==
The internal structure of stems and the presence of lateral two-valved sporangia are indicators of a relationship with the zosterophylls, although evidence is lacking for the distinct sporangial stalks which would be expected of this group. Zosterophylls which grew from coiled tips, like Trichopherophyton, also typically had a variety of outgrowths; however they had xylem which was elliptical in cross-section. Trichopherophyton thus spans the two major groups of zosterophylls identified by Niklas and Banks. Hao and Xue in 2013 listed the genus as a zosterophyll.
