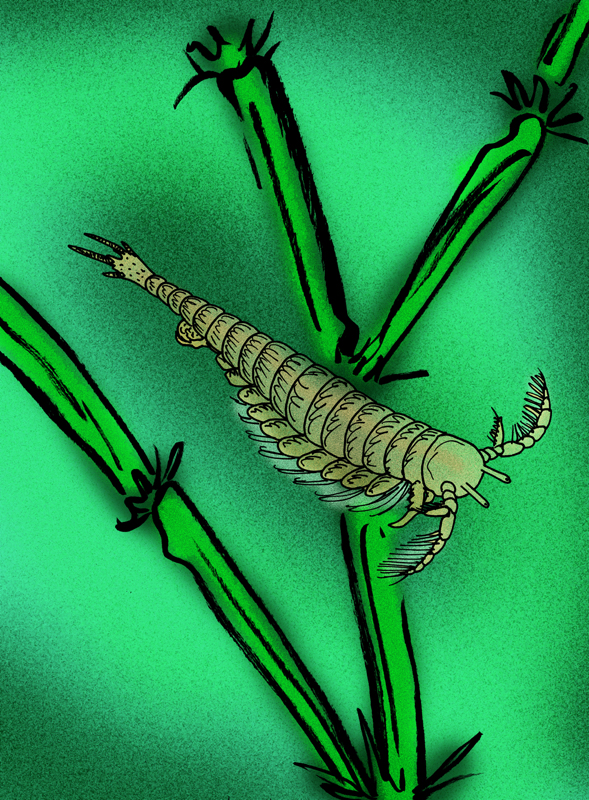
- Artist's restoration

Scientific classification
- Kingdom: Animalia
- Phylum: Arthropoda
- Clade: Pancrustacea
- Class: Branchiopoda
- Order: †Lipostraca; Scourfield, 1926
- Family: †Lepidocarididae; Scourfield, 1926
- Genus: †Lepidocaris; Scourfield, 1926
- Species: †L. rhyniensis

Binomial name
- †Lepidocaris rhyniensis Scourfield, 1926

= Lepidocaris =

Lepidocaris Temporal range: Pragian

Extinct genus of crustaceans

Lepidocaris rhyniensis is an extinct species of crustacean. It is the only species known from the order Lipostraca, and is the only abundant animal in the Pragian-aged Rhynie chert deposits. It resembles modern Anostraca, to which it is probably closely related, although its relationships to other orders remain unclear. The body is 3 mm (0.12 in) long, with 23 body segments and 19 pairs of appendages, but no carapace. It occurred chiefly among charophytes, probably in alkaline temporary pools.

== Biostratigraphy and taxonomy ==
All the known specimens of Lepidocaris rhyniensis have been excavated from the Rhynie chert deposits in Aberdeenshire, Scotland, which is a famous Lagerstätte, or site of exceptional preservation. Lepidocaris is the only abundant animal in the deposits, and is likely to be responsible for many of the frequent coprolites found in the rocks.

Lepidocaris was first described by D. J. Scourfield in a 1926 paper in the Philosophical Transactions of the Royal Society B. Scourfield could not accommodate his new genus in the same order as its closest relatives – the Anostraca – so he erected a new family and order for Lepidocaris alone: Lepidocarididae and Lipostraca, respectively. Until 2003, when Castracollis was described, Lepidocaris was the only crustacean known from the Rhynie chert.

== Etymology ==
The genus name Lepidocaris comes from λεπίς (lepís), meaning "scale", and καρίς (karís), meaning "shrimp". The specific name rhyniensis comes from Rhynie chert, the deposit the species was found in.

== Description ==
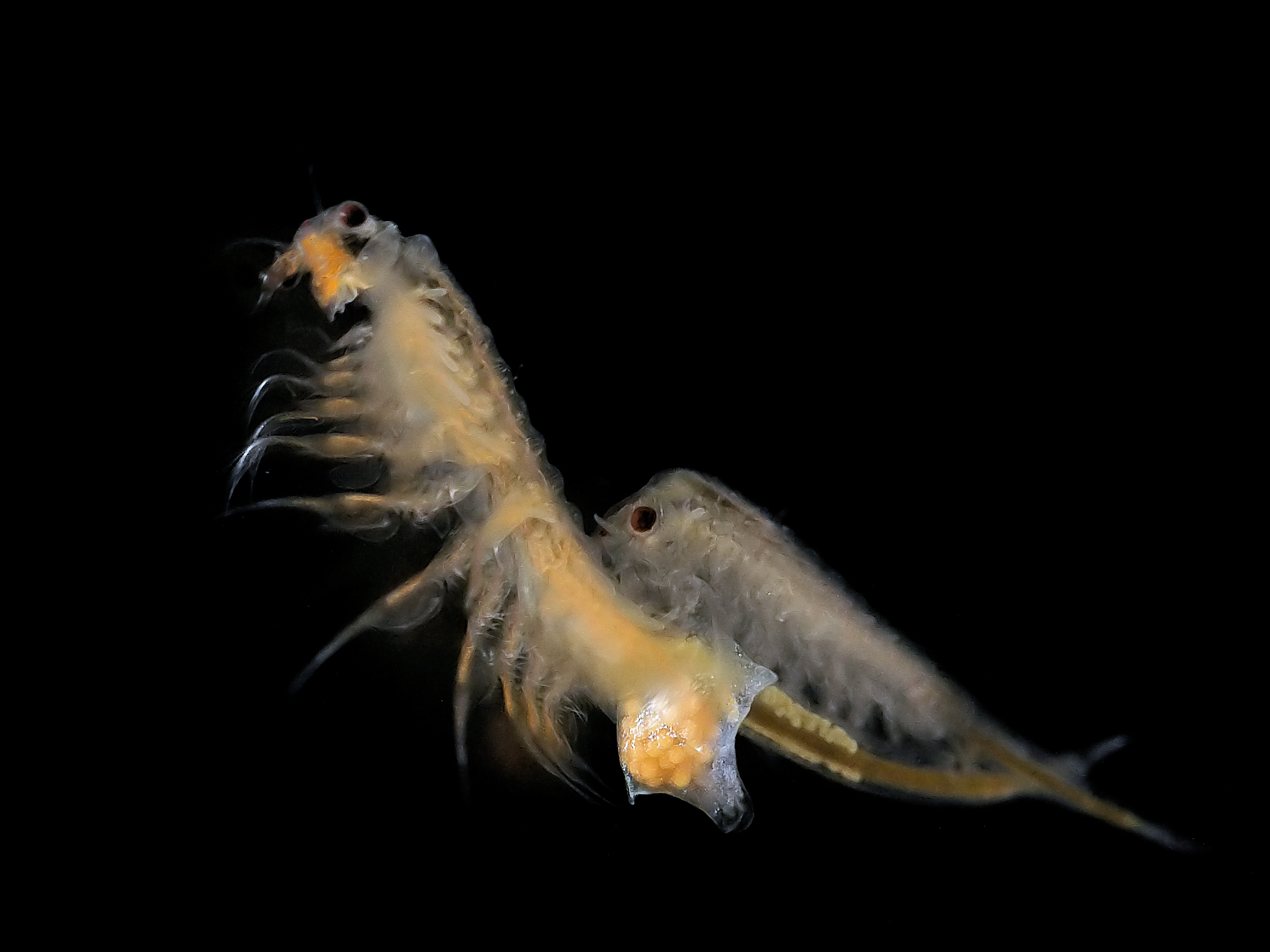
Lepidocaris may have resembled Artemia salina both morphologically and ecologically.

Lepidocaris rhyniensis is a segmented animal with 23 body segments. The whole body measures around 3 millimetres (0.12 in) long. The head has two pairs of antennae, the second of which is used for swimming. As in Anostraca, there is no carapace. There are eleven pairs of appendages on the thorax and abdomen, of which the first three pairs are phyllopodia, or leaf-like limbs, as seen in other branchiopods such as Triops, while the last eight pairs are similar to the swimming limbs of copepods. The tail ends in a pair of caudal furcae.

== Ecology ==
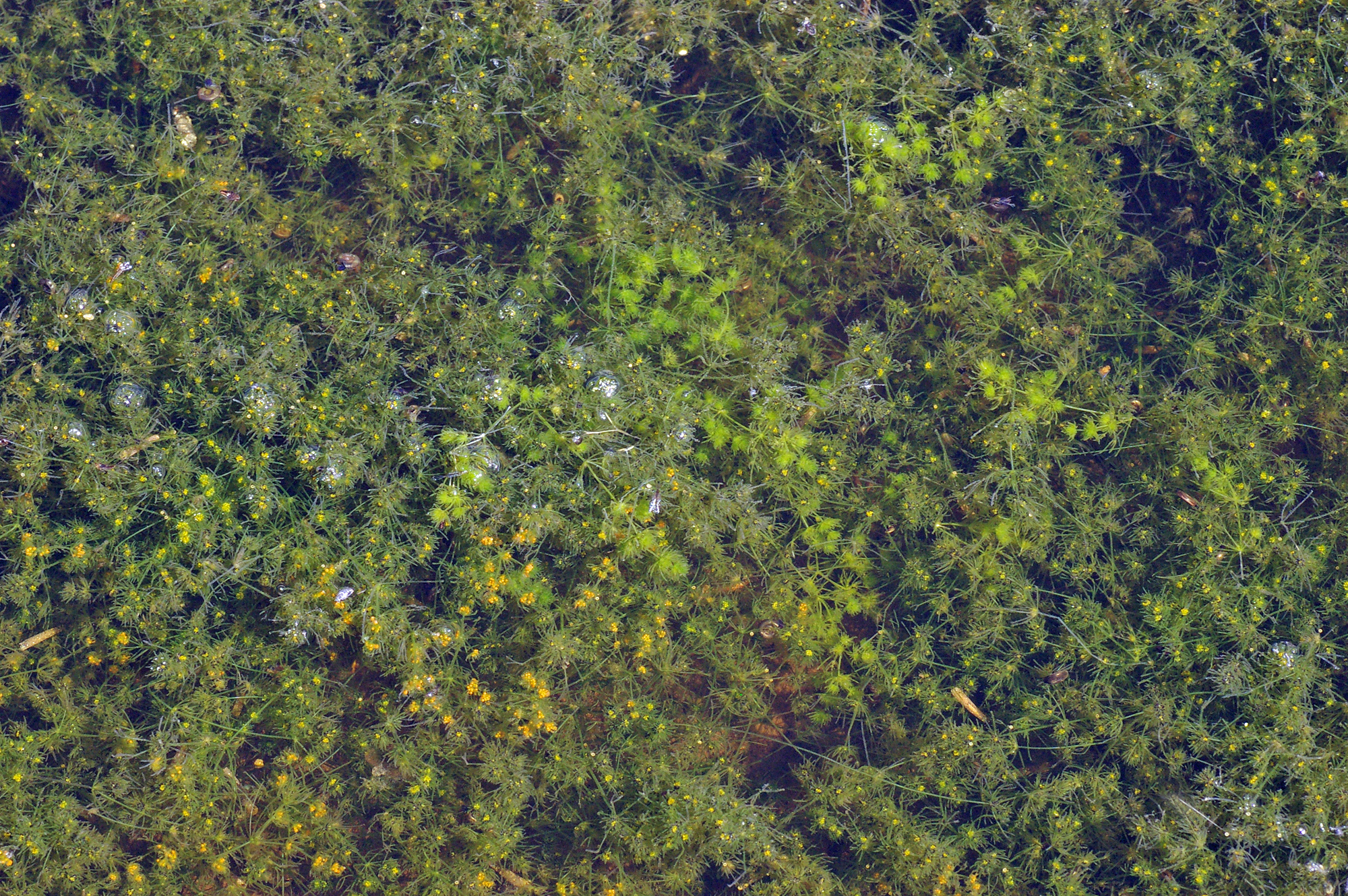
A modern Nitella meadow, seen from above; Lepidocaris is likely to have inhabited a similar habitat in the Devonian.

Lepidocaris is one of the earliest preserved freshwater crustaceans. It is frequently found in association with the charophyte Palaeonitella (Characeae); if the ecology of Palaeonitella resembled that of its modern relatives, the water would have been alkaline. Similarly, Lepidocaris is thought to have had a similar ecology to extant members of the Anostraca and the Notostraca such as Artemia and Triops, inhabiting shallow, temporary pools.

== Relationships ==
The phylogenetic position of Lepidocaris in relation to other orders of crustaceans is uncertain. In his original description of the species, Scourfield noted that Lepidocaris could not be accommodated in the existing order Anostraca, and even suggested that a position outside the Branchiopoda was not unthinkable. In 1986, Frederick Schram considered Lipostraca to be the sister group to Brachypoda, with the two orders together making up the Cephalocarida. In 1997, Dieter Walossek considered Lepidocaris and Rehbachiella to be stem-group anostracans, outside the extant Euanostraca. In 2001, Schram and Koenemann considered Lepidocaris and Rehbachiella to be stem-group lineages basal to the whole Branchiopoda.
