= Clonophycus =

Clonophycus Temporal range: Statherian-Ediacaran 1800–541 Ma

Scientific classification
- Domain: incertae sedis
- Genus: †Clonophycus; J. H. Oehler

Species
- See text

Extinct genus of algae

Clonophycus is a genus of fossil microalgae. The type species, C. elegans, was found in the Barney Creek Formation (McArthur Group), of the Middle Proterozoic of Northern Australia. The authors are uncertain if the microalgae are prokaryotic cyanobacteria or eukaryotic green or red algae.

== Species ==
- †Clonophycus belium Late Sinian to Early Cambrian
- †Clonophycus bellus Late Sinian to Early Cambrian
- †Clonophycus biattina Middle Proterozoic to Late Proterozoic - Australia (N.Territory) China(Hupei)
- †Clonophycus dissides Late Precambrian
- †Clonophycus elegans (type) Middle Proterozoic - Australia
- †Clonophycus guizhouensis Late Sinian to Early Cambrian
- †Clonophycus inaequimagnus Late Precambrian
- †Clonophycus laceyi Proterozoic
- †Clonophycus maximus Early Cambrian
- †Clonophycus ostiolum Middle Proterozoic
- †Clonophycus refringens Middle Proterozoic
- †Clonophycus vacus Sinian
- †Clonophycus vulgaris Middle Proterozoic
