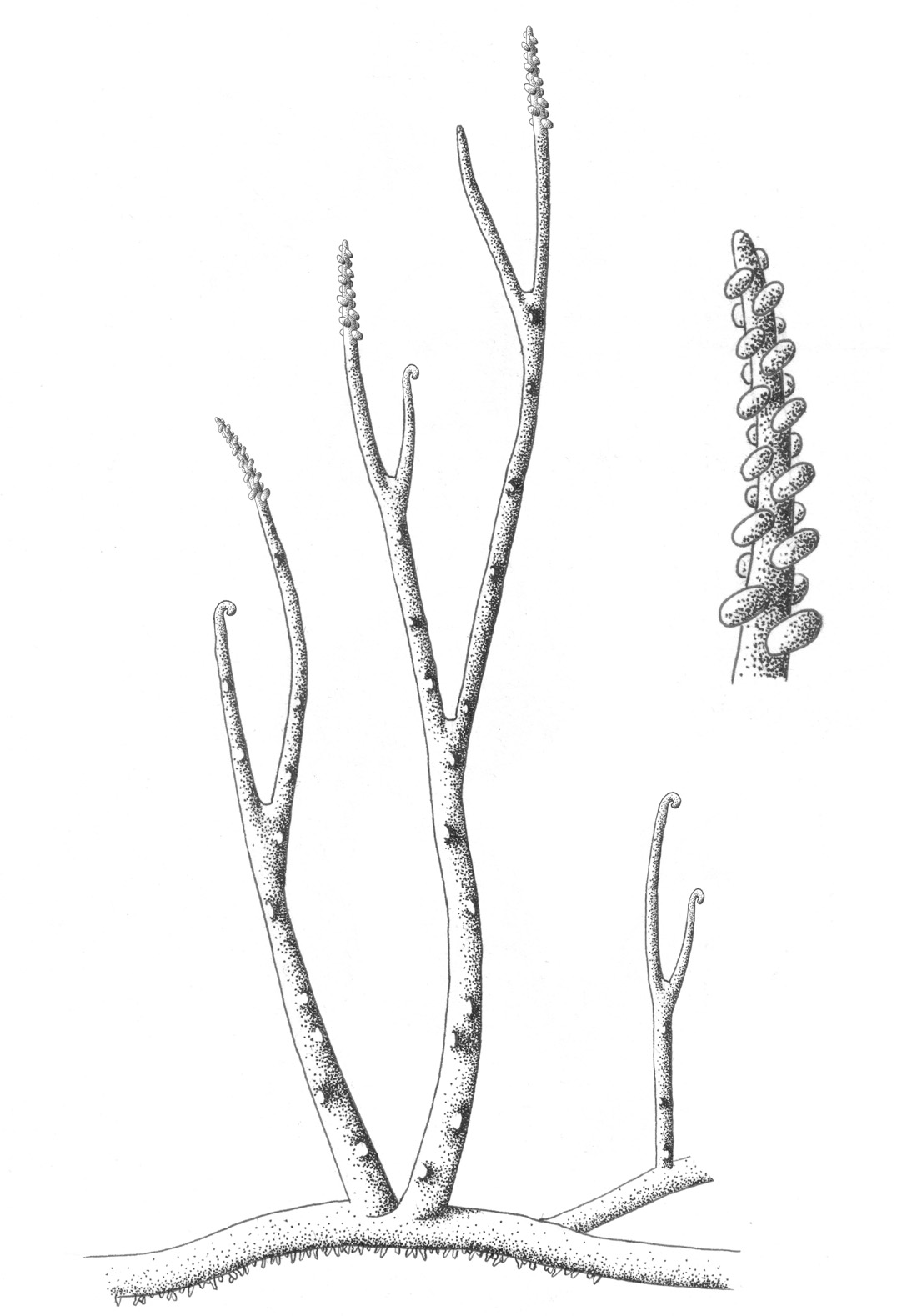

Scientific classification
- Kingdom: Plantae
- Clade: Tracheophytes
- Clade: Lycophytes
- Plesion: †Zosterophylls (?)
- Genus: †Ventarura; Powell et al. (2000)

Species
- V. lyonii Powell et al. (2000)

= Ventarura =

Ventarura Temporal range: Early Devonian

Extinct genus of spore-bearing plants

Ventarura is a genus of extinct vascular plants of the Early Devonian (around 420 to 390 million years ago). Fossils were found in the Windyfield chert, Rhynie, Scotland. Some features, such as bivalved sporangia borne laterally and the anatomy of the xylem, relate this genus to the zosterophylls. Other features are unclear due to poor preservation.

== Description ==
Fossils of Ventarura were found in the Windyfield chert, slightly separate from the better-known Rhynie chert, both located near the village of Rhynie, Scotland. Only fragmentary fossils were found, the longest being around 12 cm long. Stems (axes) of two kinds were found, although without clear connections between them. Aerial stems were leafless, smooth and dichotomously branched. They contained an exarch xylem strand containing G-type tracheids. Alone among the Rhynie chert plants, there was evidence of sclerenchyma – supporting tissue made up of dead cells with thick cell walls. Spore-forming organs or sporangia were borne on the sides of the stems, attached without clear stalks. They consisted of two circular to pear-shaped 'valves', one slightly narrower facing the stem, one away from it. Sporangia may have formed a two-rowed spike or strobilus. Spores were shed via a slit at the top of the sporangium between thickened valve borders. Spores were of one kind, about 67 μm in diameter, without trilete marks.

What are thought to be the underground stems of Ventarura had single-celled hairs, presumably rhizoids, on all sides. They branched irregularly and more often compared to aerial stems.

== Phylogeny ==
Ventarura was described too late to be included in the cladistic studies published by Kenrick and Crane in 1997 which are the source of much of the information on the phylogeny of early land plants (see Polysporangiophytes: Taxonomy). The shape of the sporangia and their lateral position as well as the anatomy of the xylem show a clear relationship to the zosterophylls. However, the arrangement of the sporangia is difficult to determine from the fossil specimens. Zosterophylls are thought to be the earliest diverging group of lycophytes, a group which includes modern clubmosses and relatives.
