= Calymmian =

First period of the Mesoproterozoic Era

- 1600 – 1400 Ma
- Paleoglobe of the Earth during the middle of the Calymmian, c. 1500 Mya

Chronology
← / Breakup of the supercontinent Columbia; ← / “Gaoyuzhuang biota” emerges, earliest Archaeplastida?
Events of the Calymmian Period; Vertical axis scale: Millions of years ago

Etymology
- Name formality: Formal

Usage information
- Celestial body: Earth
- Regional usage: Global (ICS)
- Time scale(s) used: ICS Time Scale

Definition
- Chronological unit: Period
- Stratigraphic unit: System
- Time span formality: Formal
- Lower boundary definition: Defined chronometrically
- Lower GSSA ratified: 1990
- Upper boundary definition: Defined chronometrically
- Upper GSSA ratified: 1990

The Calymmian (from Ancient Greek: κάλυμμα, romanized: kálymma, meaning 'cover') is the first geologic period in the Mesoproterozoic Era, lasting from 1600 to 1400 million years ago (Ma) and spanning 200 million years. It follows the Statherian Period from the Paleoproterozoic Era, and precedes the Ectasian Period. Instead of being based on stratigraphy, these dates are defined chronometrically.

The period is characterised by the expansion of existing platform covers, and by new platforms forming on basements that were recently cratonized.

The supercontinent of Columbia started to break up during the Calymmian some 1500 Mya. The Volyn biota have also been dated to 1500 Mya.

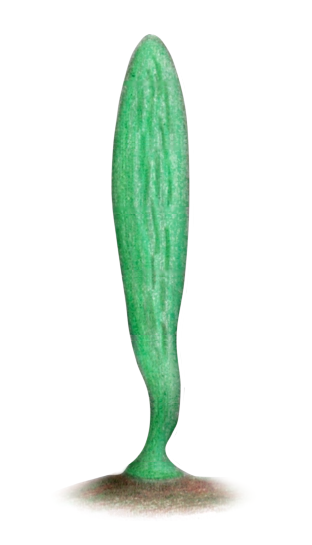
A reconstruction of Grandilingulata qianxiensis, a macrofossil from the Calymmian Gaoyuzhuang Formation

== See also ==
- Boring Billion – Earth history, 1.8 to 0.8 billion years ago
- Jotnian – Oldest known sediments in the Baltic area that have not been subject to metamorphism
