= Caia (plant) =

Caia Temporal range: Late Silurian

Scientific classification
- Kingdom: Plantae
- Clade: Embryophytes
- Clade: Polysporangiophytes
- Class: †Horneophytopsida (?)
- Genus: †Caia; Fanning et al. (1990)

Species
- †C. langii Fanning et al. (1990)

Extinct genus of plants

Caia is a genus of small fossil plants of Late Silurian age (around 430 to 420 million years ago). The diagnostic characters are naked parallel-sided axes branching isotomously, terminating in vertically elongate sporangia (spore-forming organs) which bear spinous emergences particularly at the distal ends. Spores are trilete and retusoid. The only known species is from Hereford, England.

Cladistic analysis suggests that the genus may belong to the Horneophytopsida, a class of the polysporangiophytes, as it lacks vascular tissue and has branched stems bearing sporangia. For the cladogram, see the Horneophytopsida article.
