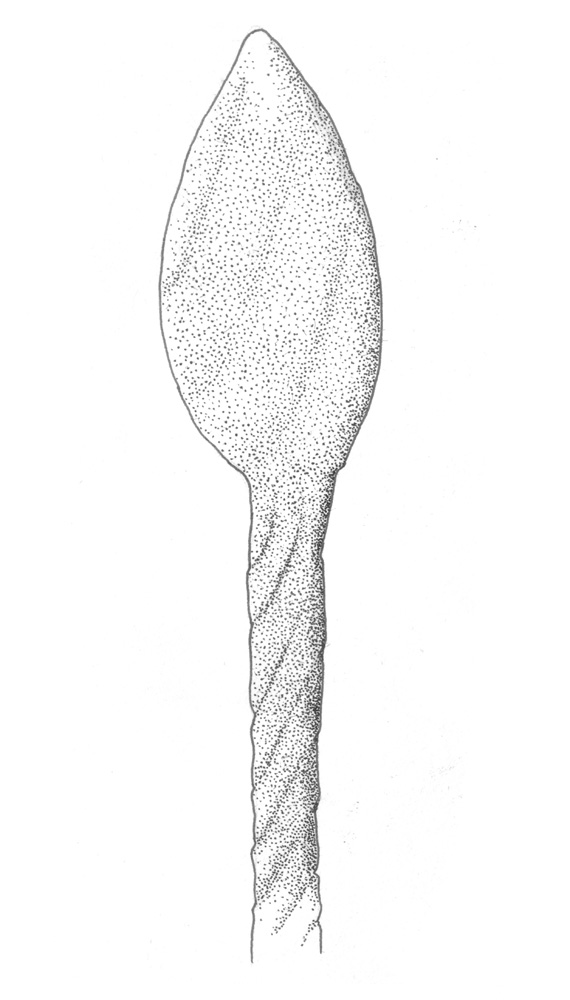

Scientific classification
- Clade: Archaeplastida
- Kingdom: Plantae
- Clade: Embryophytes
- Clade: Polysporangiophytes
- Class: †Horneophytopsida (?)
- Genus: †Tortilicaulis; D.Edwards (1979)

Type species
- Tortilicaulis transwalliensis D.Edwards (1979)

Species
- T. offaeus D.Edwards et al. (1994); T. transwalliensis D.Edwards (1979)

= Tortilicaulis =

Tortilicaulis Temporal range: Late Silurian–Early Devonian

Extinct genus of Devonian plants

Tortilicaulis is a moss-like plant known from fossils recovered from southern Britain, spanning the Silurian-Devonian boundary (around 430 to 390 million years ago). Originally recovered from the Downtonian of the Welsh borderlands, Tortilicaulis has since been recovered in the famous Ludlow Lane locality.

Whilst it is generally accepted that Tortilicaulis was moss-like, it has not yet been recovered in a sufficiently good state of preservation to allow the detailed study necessary to firmly assign it to a taxonomic group. Fossils consist of an elongate apical sporangium (spore-forming organ), which may be branched, with spiralled walls attached to an undivided stalk that is also twisted. Unusually for plants of its time, spores of Tortilicaulis were covered all over with small granules.

The initial suspicions of its describer, Dianne Edwards, were that it was a bryophyte, and comparisons have been made with several groups. A potential association with the moss Takakia is supported by features of the sporangia, such as the elongate shape, unusual twisting, and terminal position of the sporangia.

As the sporangia of Tortilicaulis are branched, cladistic analysis suggests that the genus may instead belong to the Horneophytopsida, a class of the polysporangiophytes, which unlike bryophytes, have branched stems bearing sporangia. Its precise nature and hence classification remains unclear. For the cladogram, see the Horneophytopsida article.
