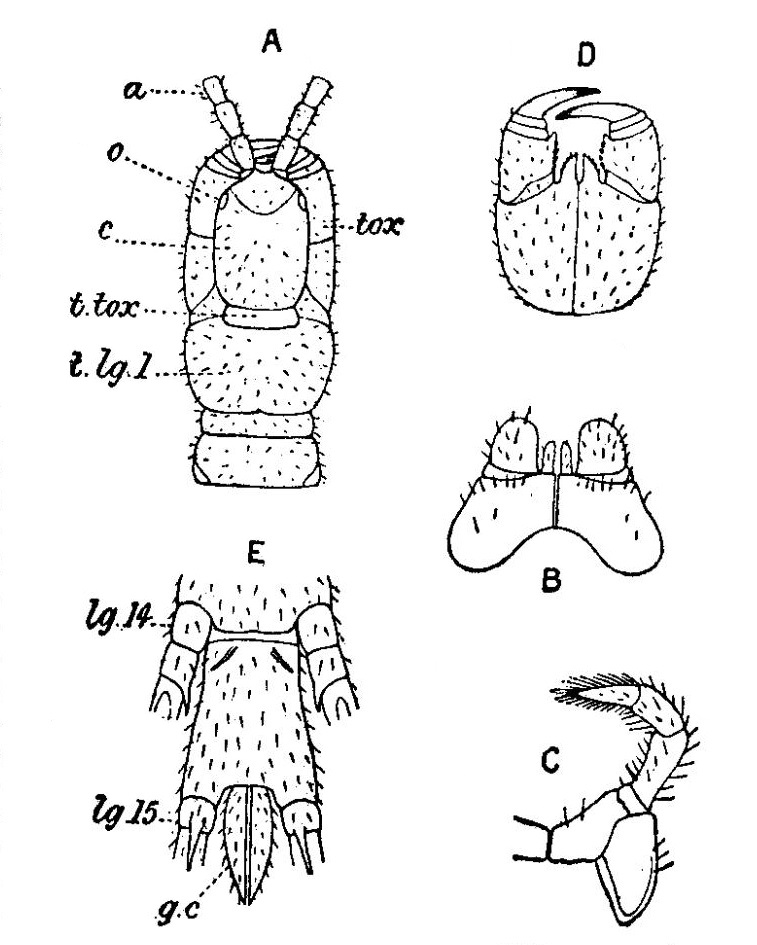

Scientific classification
- Kingdom: Animalia
- Phylum: Arthropoda
- Subphylum: Myriapoda
- Class: Chilopoda
- Order: Craterostigmomorpha
- Family: Craterostigmidae
- Genus: Craterostigmus
- Species: C. tasmanianus

Binomial name
- Craterostigmus tasmanianus Pocock, 1902

= Craterostigmus tasmanianus =

Species of common Tasmanian centipede

Craterostigmus tasmanianus, also known as the Tasmanian remarkable centipede, is a species of Tasmanian centipede endemic and widespread on the island.

== Description ==
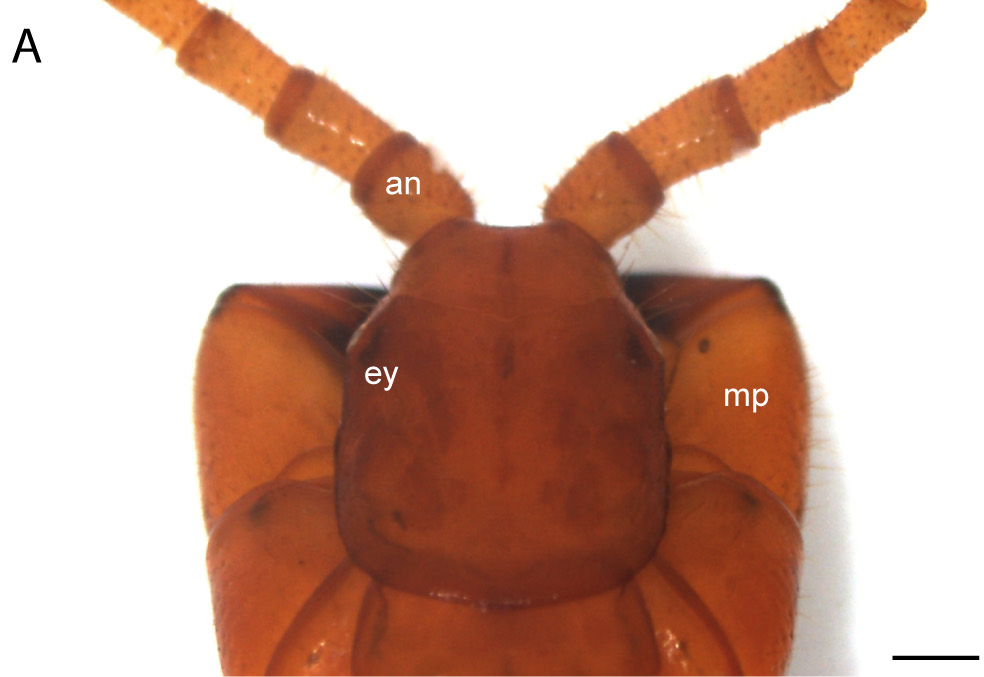
Head

Craterostigmus tasmanianus is a small, greenish or yellowish-brown centipede, growing up to 50 millimetres (2.0 in) in length. It has a long reddish-brown head with a single ocellus on either side of the cephalic plate (head shield), and dark reddish-brown forcipules extending visibly forward past the plate. It cannot be distinguished from Craterostigmus crabilli on a basis of colour. The antennae taper, are divided into 17 or 18 articles (antennomeres), are recorded as about one quarter the length of the head, and are hirsute, especially closer to the tips. The species is generally slow-moving. Adults have 15 pairs of legs and 21 tergites.

== Distribution, habitat and ecology ==
Craterostigmus tasmanianus is widespread across Tasmania (and especially common in the west), as well as other nearby islands, but not on the mainland. It is found in a variety and elevations, ranging from sea-level to highland (up to 1300 m), but is restricted to woodland habitats, both dry and wet. In drier areas, it is restricted microhabitats such as leaf litter, piled rocks rotting logs, and deep humus. The record for average density is one specimen per 12 m^{2}, from a 1992 hand-collecting expedition (in Nothofagus forest).

== Behaviour ==
=== Reproduction and development ===
The brood chambers of C. tasmanianus are usually cavities in damp rotting logs or excavations in the soil. The breeding season runs from November to February, and brooding occurs between September and April. Like members of the Scolopendromorph and Geophilmorph orders, the mother coils around the eggs and early instars to guard them. Hatchlings emerge from the eggs with 12 pairs of legs, then gain three final ones in their first moult. They then disperse in winter into the leaf litter. Mothers have been recorded to lay anywhere between 44 and 77 eggs at a time.

=== Diet ===
The diet of C. tasmanianus remains unknown, but several theories have been advanced. It may prey on other arthropods, such as isopods, millipedes, beetles, amphipods, maggots, mites, springtails, and even other centipedes. In captivity, they can be sustained on flies, crickets, and isopods, and have been observed using their forcipules to dig into termite mounds for food, although this behaviour has not yet been observed in the wild. Some sources suggest that it may be a specialist predator on termites and other burrowing insects.

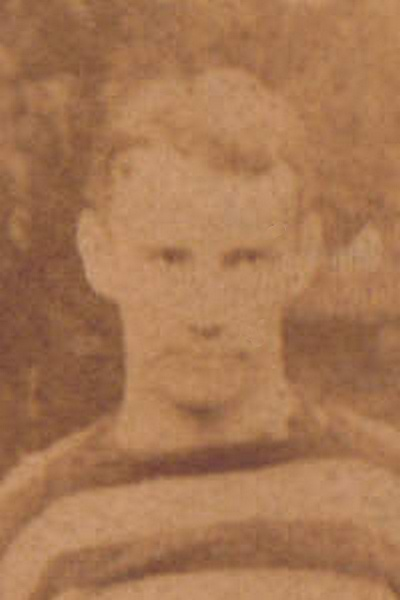
Reginald Innes Pocock

== Taxonomy ==
Craterostigmus tasmanianus was described in 1902 by Reginald Innes Pocock. The type specimen was found on the summit of Mount Rumney, outside the city of Hobart. It is the type species of the genus Craterostigmus, and was, until 2008 when C. crabilli was named, the only species in the genus. Records of C. tasmanianus from New Zealand are almost certainly C. crabilli.
