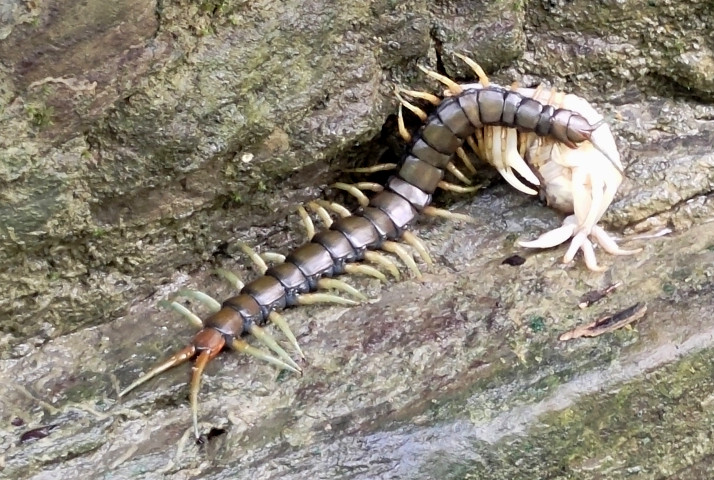
- Halcyon centipede consuming a crab

Scientific classification
- Kingdom: Animalia
- Phylum: Arthropoda
- Subphylum: Myriapoda
- Class: Chilopoda
- Order: Scolopendromorpha
- Family: Scolopendridae
- Genus: Scolopendra
- Species: S. alcyona

Binomial name
- Scolopendra alcyona Tsukamoto & Shimano, 2021

= Scolopendra alcyona =

Species of centipede

Scolopendra alcyona, the Halcyon giant centipede, is a species of amphibious centipede found in the Ryukyu Archipelago of Japan and Taiwan. It is the third amphibious member of the genus Scolopendra discovered so far, and the largest species of centipede in Japan, as well as the first new centipede species discovered in Japan for 143 years.

== Appearance ==
Scolopendra alcyona has a greenish-black to jade or turquoise coloured trunk, a brownish black head, bluish-black antennae, and greenish blue ultimate legs, all other legs being yellow in the first article, greenish blue in further ones. In specimens found on Kume-jima island, the legs were wholly yellow. The forcipules and coxosternite are light brown, the sternites pale green, and the pleurons are bluish black with greenish black integument.

Scolopendra alcyona is the largest species of centipede in Japan, and grows to twenty centimetres in length and two centimetres in width.

== Discovery ==
Researchers at the Tokyo Metropolitan University first heard reports of S. alcyona as an unidentified centipede attacking and feeding on freshwater prawns in the Ryukyu archipelago. A group of researchers led by myriapodologist Sho Tsukamoto and Associate Professor Katsuyuki Eguchi then verified the sightings, and described it as a new species, using genetic analysis to confirm the discovery. Seven specimens were collected in total. S. alcyona can also be distinguished as a new species by morphological features, such as a spur on the twentieth legs. The paper describing the species was released on April 12, 2021, in Zootaxa.

== Diet, behaviour, and ecology ==
Scolopendra alcyona lives in forested streamside habitats in the Ryukyu archipelago and Taiwan. It hunts giant freshwater prawns. It can often be found under stones in nearby streams.

== Distribution ==
Scolopendra alcyona is found in the Ryukyu Archipelago, specifically on Kume-jima and Okinawa-jima islands, as well as in Taiwan, although it could also be found on other Ryukyu islands, such as Tokashiki-jima, Ishigaki-jima, and Iriomote-jima.

== Taxonomy and nomenclature ==
Scolopendra alcyona is in the family Scolopendridae, specifically in the subfamily Scolopendrinae and in the tribe Scolopendrini.

=== Scientific name ===
The species name comes from Greek mythology, namely the myth of Alcyone and Ceyx, who sacrilegously called each other "Zeus" and "Hera". This angered the gods, who, while he was out on a sea voyage, sunk Ceyx's ship with a thunderbolt. The God of Dreams, Morpheus, appeared to Alcyone in her sleep and informed her of her husband's fate. Struck with grief, she threw herself into the sea, but the gods pitied her and transformed her and her husband Ceyx into kingfisher (Halcyon) birds.

The centipede was named after Alcyone due to its legs, which are of similar colour to that of the kingfisher.

=== Japanese name ===
The Japanese name for the centipede is also a reference to mythology. A local myth has it that a local ryûjin, or dragon god, had a centipede enter his ear. He was in great pain, and, after seeing a chicken eat a centipede, lived in fear of both animals. The local people then began to paint chickens on their boats and hoist centipede flags as a way to ensure safe voyage in the sea and scare off the god.

== Protection ==
On July 1, 2021, the Japanese Ministry of the Environment granted Scolopendra alcyona, along with two newly-discovered cockroach species (the Benieriruri cockroach and the Usuobiruri cockroach), Urgent Endangered Species Designation until 2024. The Ministry's reasoning was that the announcement of the new species attracted the attentions of collectors and enthusiasts in both Japan and other countries, and the capture and selling of the species could lead to the decline of the species. Habitat loss is also a concern.
