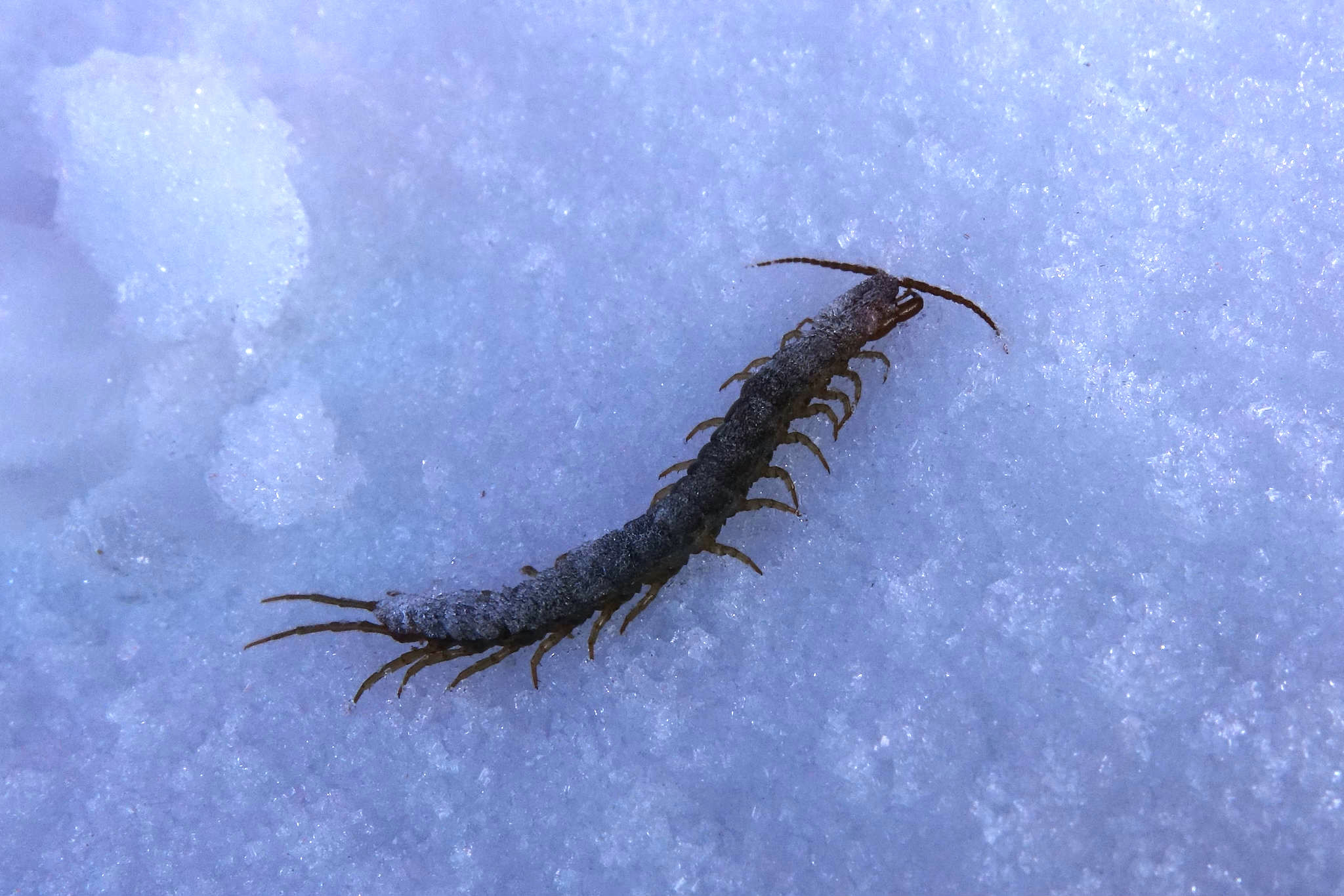
- Craterostigmus crabilli

Scientific classification
- Kingdom: Animalia
- Phylum: Arthropoda
- Subphylum: Myriapoda
- Class: Chilopoda
- Order: Craterostigmomorpha
- Family: Craterostigmidae
- Genus: Craterostigmus
- Species: C. crabilli

Binomial name
- Craterostigmus crabilli Edgecombe & Giribet, 2008

= Craterostigmus crabilli =

Species of New Zealand centipede

Craterostigmus crabilli, also known as Crabill's centipede, is a species of small centipede in the order Craterostigmomorpha. It is endemic to New Zealand.

== Taxonomy ==
C. crabilli is one of two species in the order Craterostigmomorpha. It was named in honour of Ralph E. Crabill Jr (1925-1992), who had intended to describe the species within his lifetime.

== Description ==
C. crabilli is a small centipede, and is generally smaller than its Tasmanian counterpart in the genus, C. tasmanianus. According to a 2008 paper, the largest specimen recorded had a body length of 3.7 cm, however, other sources say C. crabilli can attain 5 cm in length. It is variable in colour, and the body can range from pale orange to shades of brown. The head is reddish brown and large, and the maxillipedes (forcipules) are extremely large and clearly visible from above.

== Distribution ==
The species occurs in the South Island. The type locality is Governor’s Bush, Aoraki / Mount Cook National Park.
