= Eucorydia donanensis =

Usuobiruri cockroach

Scientific classification
- Kingdom: Animalia
- Phylum: Arthropoda
- Clade: Pancrustacea
- Class: Insecta
- Order: Blattodea
- Family: Corydiidae
- Genus: Eucorydia
- Species: E. donanensis

Binomial name
- Eucorydia donanensis Yanagisawa, Sakamaki &Shimano, 2021

Species of cockroach

Eucorydia donanensis is a species of iridescent cockroach in the family Corydiidae. It was discovered on Yonaguni Island of Japan's Ryukyu Archipelago, and was believed to be restricted to that island until its discovery on nearby Ishigakijima Island in June 2022.

== Appearance ==
=== Colour and size ===
Eucorydia donanensis males grow to 12.5 to 14.5 mm in length, while females grow between 13–15.2 mm. They have brown heads, with black antennae divided into 38–40 segments. Their pronotums are metallic blue or green, their tegmens are the same colour but with an indistinct orange or poppy coloured band, the dimness of the band varying by individual specimen. Their abdomens are dark purple.

=== Similar species ===
Eucorydia donanensis resembles E. yatsumatsui, E. dasytoides, E. tokaraensis, E. yunnanensis, and E. guilinensis. It can be differentiated from those species by its length and coloration.

== Protection ==
On June 29, 2021, the Japanese Ministry of the Environment placed the Usuobiruri cockroach, along with two other recently discovered species (Scolopendra alcyona and Eucorydia miyakoensis), under "Critically Endangered Species Protection". This protection punishes the killing, unauthorized display, or exportation of the species with up to five years in jail or a fine of up to 5 million ¥ ($USD 45558). The protection was made in response to interest from international hobbyists and collectors.
