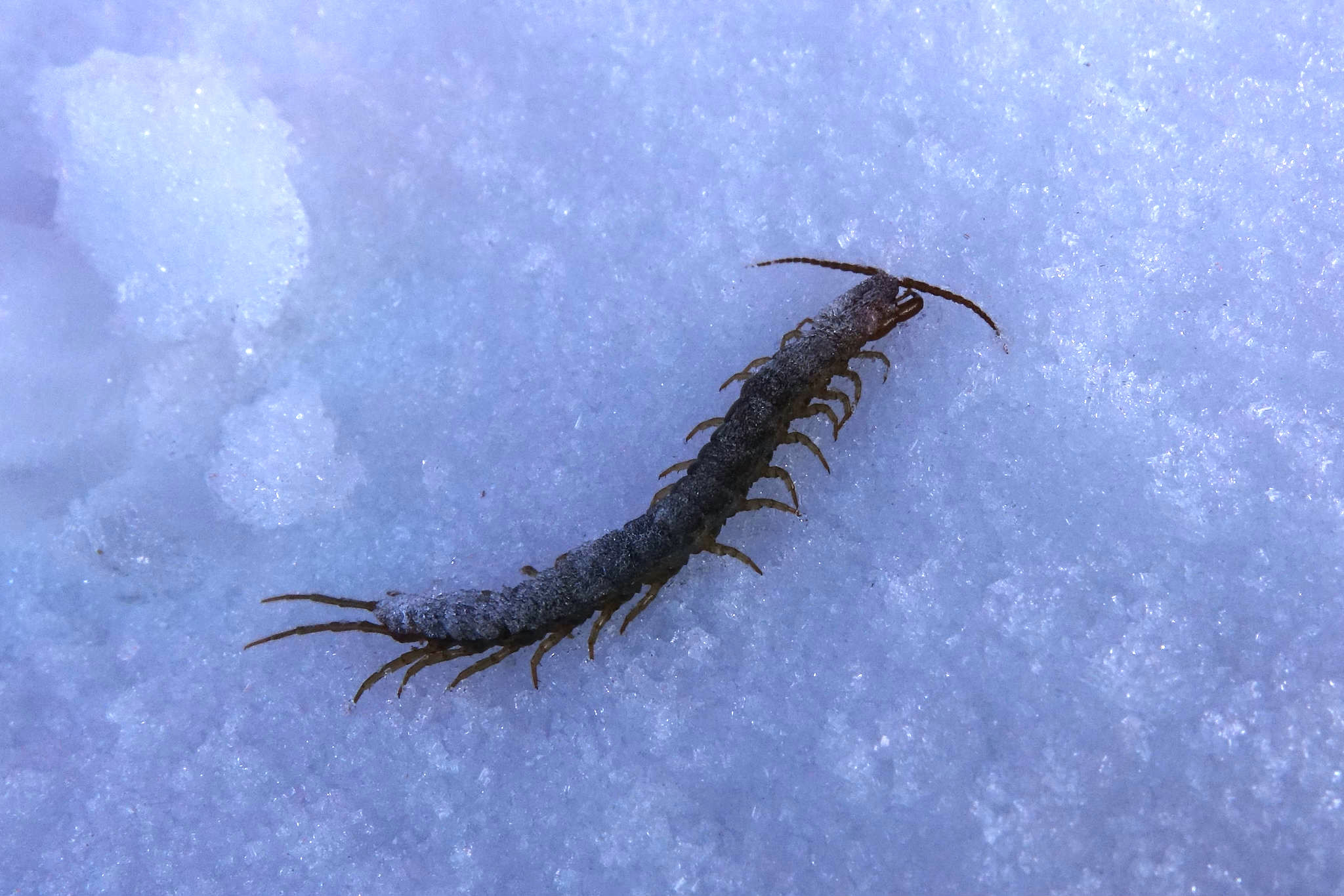
- Craterostigmus crabilli
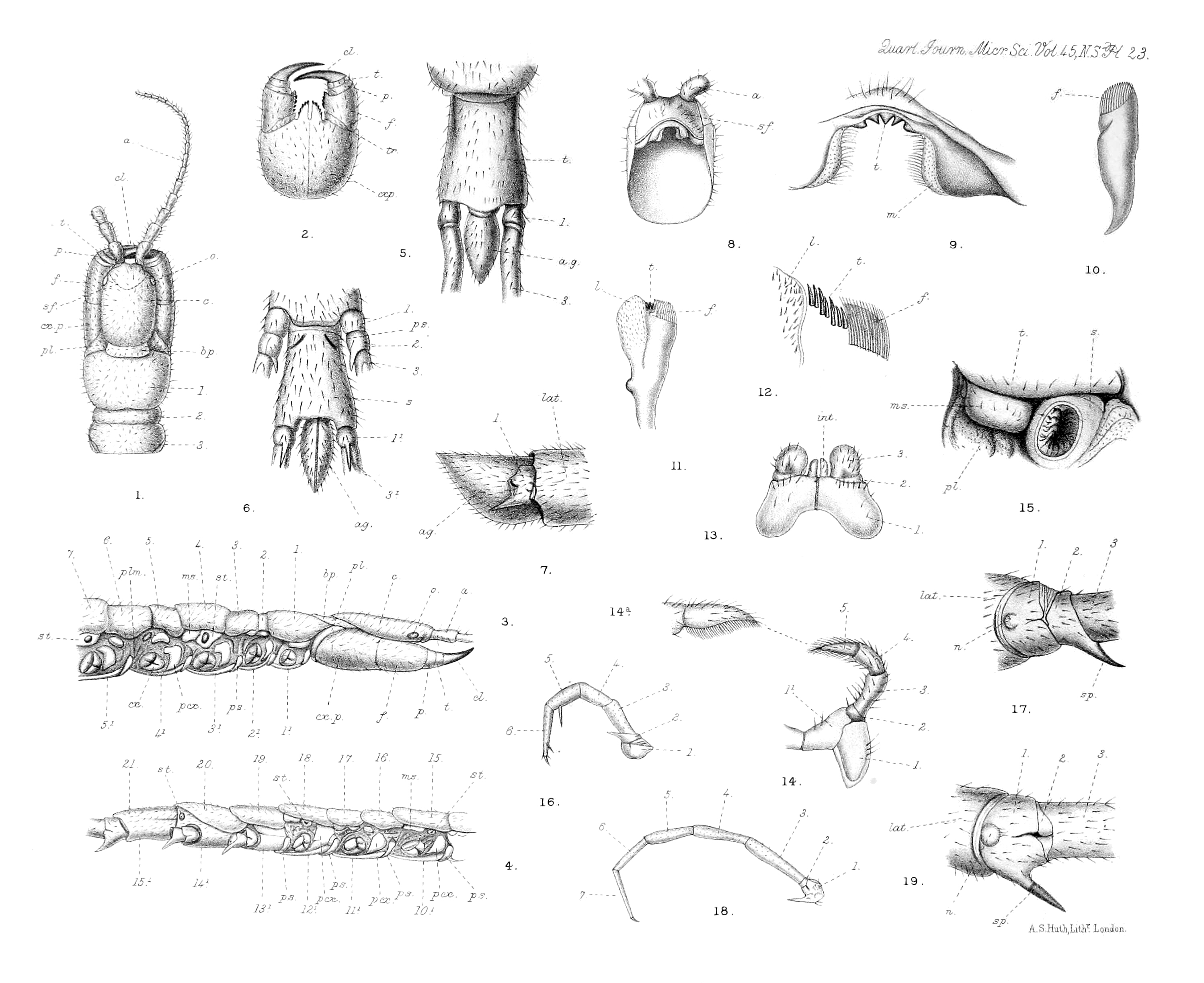
- Structural features of C. tasmanianus illustrated by Reginald Innes Pocock

Scientific classification
- Kingdom: Animalia
- Phylum: Arthropoda
- Subphylum: Myriapoda
- Class: Chilopoda
- Order: Craterostigmomorpha
- Family: Craterostigmidae; Pocock, 1902
- Genus: Craterostigmus; Pocock, 1902

Type species
- Craterostigmus tasmanianus Pocock, 1902

Other species
- Craterostigmus crabilli Edgecombe & Giribet, 2008

= Craterostigmus =

Genus of centipedes

Craterostigmus is a genus of centipedes belonging to the monogeneric family Craterostigmidae. The species are found in Australasia. Craterostigmus species, especially C. tasmanianus, are an evolutionarily important group of centipedes known for their unique genetic, sensory, and ecological adaptations. Their distinct phylogenetic position highlights their independent evolutionary history within myriapods, underscoring their significance in studies of centipede evolution and the biodiversity of Tasmania. They have elliptical, bipartite eye, which is located fronto-laterally on either side of their head and their body has lots of morphological peculiarities
