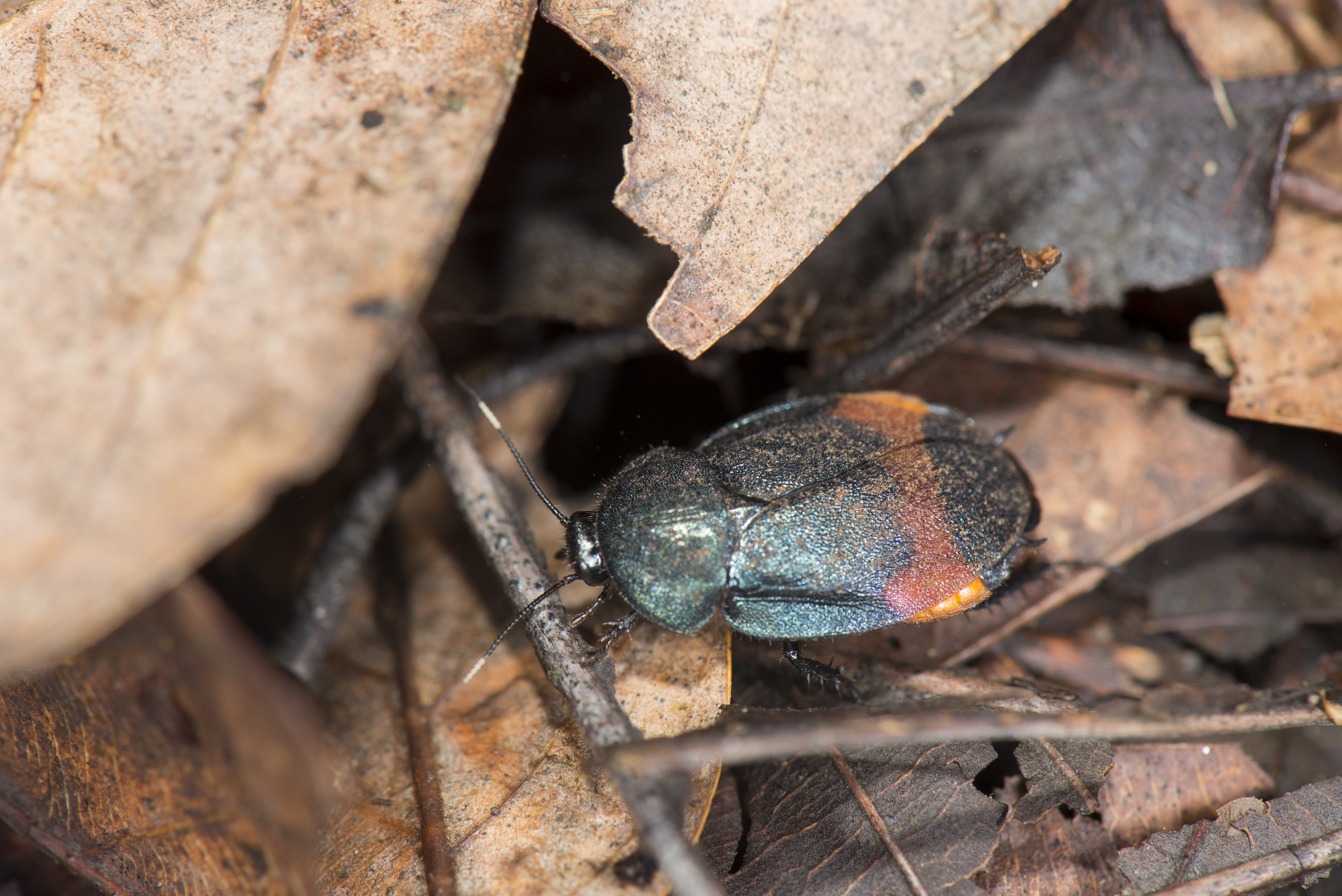

Scientific classification
- Kingdom: Animalia
- Phylum: Arthropoda
- Clade: Pancrustacea
- Class: Insecta
- Order: Blattodea
- Family: Corydiidae
- Genus: Eucorydia
- Species: E. aenea

Binomial name
- Eucorydia aenea Beier, 1963

Synonyms
- Corydia aenea Brunner von Wattenwyl, 1865; Corydia elegans (Brunner von Wattenwyl, 1893); Corydia plagiata; Corydia taitoensis; Corydia tonkinensis; Corydia zonata; Euthyrrapha dasytoides

= Eucorydia aenea =

Species of cockroach

Eucorydia aenea is a species of cockroach in the Corydiidae family. It is found in Asia.

== Subspecies ==
The species is divided into the following subspecies:

- Eucorydia aenea aenea (Brunner von Wattenwyl, 1865)
- Eucorydia aenea dasytoides (Walker, F., 1868)
- Eucorydia aenea plagiata (Walker, F., 1868)
