= Panther Mountain Formation =

Geologic formation in New York, United States

- Stratigraphic range: Givetian
- Type: Formation
- Unit of: Hamilton Group
- Underlies: Portland Point Formation, Plattekill Formation
- Overlies: Cherry Valley Limestone

Lithology
- Primary: Shale

Location
- Region: New York
- Country: United States

Type section
- Named for: Panther Mountain

The Panther Mountain Formation is a geologic formation in New York. It preserves fossils dating back to the Devonian period. It is located in the counties of Albany, Madison, Oneida, Otsego, and Schoharie. It is well known for its fossil arthropods preserved as flattened cuticles, including Attercopus and Dracochela.

== Paleobiota ==
=== Arachnids ===
Arachnids
Genus	Species	Notes	Images
Aculeatarbus	A. depressus	A trigonotarbid in the family Palaeocharinidae.	
Alkenia	A. mirabilis	A trigonotarbid in the family Aphantomartidae.	
Archaeacarus	A. dubinini	A mite in the family Alicorhagiidae.	
Archaeomartus	A. levis	A trigonotarbid in the family Archaeomartidae. A. tuberculatus is a synonym of A. levis.	
Attercopus	A. fimbriunguis	A member of order Uraraneida. Originally described as a species of Gelasinotarbus.	
Devonacarus	D. sellnicki	A oribatid mite.	
Dracochela	D. deprehendor	A pseudoscorpion.	
Ecchosis	E. pulchribothrium	An indeterminate pulmonate (arthropod with book lung), possibly whip spider.	
Gelasinotarbus	G. bonamoae, G. bifidus, G. heptops, G. reticulatus	Trigonotarbids in the family Palaeocharinidae.	
Gilboarachne	G. griersoni	Trigonotarbids in the family Palaeocharinidae.	
Palaeocharinus	P. sp.	Trigonotarbids in the family Palaeocharinidae.	
Protochthonius	P. gilboa	A oribatid mite.	

=== Myriapods ===
Myriapods
Genus	Species	Notes	Images
Crussolum	C. crusserratum	A scutigeromorph centipede.	
Devonobius	D. delta	A centipede in the order Devonobiomorpha.	
Microdecemplex	M. rolfei	A millipede in the order Microdecemplicida.	

=== Insects ===
Eye fragments of supposed archaeognathan affinities, and scales of possible archaeognathan or zygentoman affinities are known.

=== Flora ===
Flora
Genus	Species	Notes	Images
Haskinsia	H. colophylla	Lycopod.	
Lecleruqia	L. complexa	Lycopod.	
Rellimia	R. thomsonii	a progymnosperm.	

== See also ==
- Gilboa Fossil Forest, forest existed in Givetian of New York
- List of fossiliferous stratigraphic units in New York
