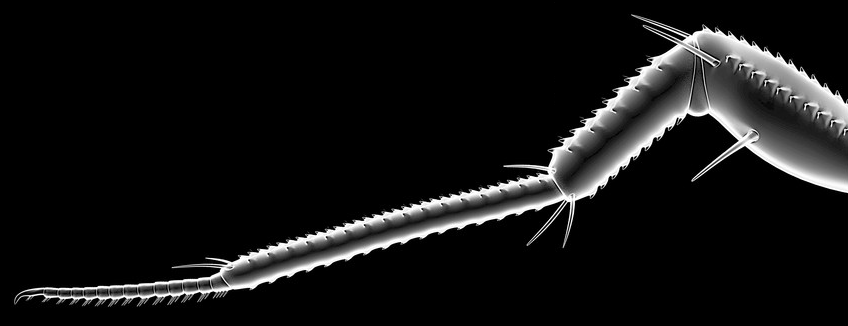
- Reconstruction of a generalised Crussolum leg

Scientific classification
- Domain: Eukaryota
- Kingdom: Animalia
- Phylum: Arthropoda
- Subphylum: Myriapoda
- Class: Chilopoda
- Order: Scutigeromorpha
- Genus: †Crussolum; Shear, Jeram & Selden, 1998
- Species: †C. crusserratum

Binomial name
- †Crussolum crusserratum Shear, Jeram & Selden, 1998

= Crussolum =

Crussolum Temporal range: Ludfordian–Givetian

Extinct genus of centipede

Crussolum is a genus of Silurian and Devonian centipedes from the US and Britain. It is the oldest known centipede.

== Description ==
Crussolum contains one species, C. crusserratum known from the Panther Mountain Formation. Fossils from the Rhynie chert and Ludford Corner are identifiable to the genus, but are too poorly preserved to place as anything more than Crussolum spp., although they likely represent new taxa, and may not even be within this genus. The genus is only known from legs, alongside a maxilliped and antennae. These legs closely resemble those of scutigeromorph centipedes, hence its placement in this group. While they resemble those of Scutigera relatively closely, their femur and tarsus are much shorter. The antennae and maxilliped are only placed within Crussolum due to the lack of other known centipedes from the Rhynie chert, and their affinity within this genus is uncertain. The aforementioned antenna has at least 21 segments, however only the distal end is preserved.

== Etymology ==
The genus name Crussolum is derived from "crus" meaning "legs" and "solum" meaning "only", in reference to how the genus is only known from legs. The specific name crusserratum also derives from "crus", alongside the word "serratum" meaning "serrated".
