= Palenarthrus =

Scientific classification
- Kingdom: Animalia
- Phylum: Arthropoda
- Subphylum: Myriapoda
- Class: Chilopoda
- Order: Scolopendromorpha
- Genus: †Palenarthrus; Scudder, 1890

Type species
- Palenarthrus impressus Scudder, 1890

Extinct genus of centipedes

Palenarthrus is an extinct genus of scolopendromorph centipedes. It existed during the Carboniferous in what is now Illinois (found in Mazon Creek fossil beds). This genus is known from single poorly preserved specimen, which is not informative expect that is likely to be a scolopendromorph.
