= Dracochela =

Dracochela Temporal range: Givetian–Eifelian

Scientific classification
- Kingdom: Animalia
- Phylum: Arthropoda
- Subphylum: Chelicerata
- Class: Arachnida
- Order: Pseudoscorpiones
- Family: †Dracochelidae; Schawaller, Shear & Bonamo, 1991
- Genus: †Dracochela; Schawaller, Shear & Bonamo, 1991
- Species: †D. deprehendor

Binomial name
- †Dracochela deprehendor Schawaller, Shear & Bonamo, 1991

Extinct genus of pseudoscorpions

Dracochela is an extinct genus of stem group pseudoscorpions that lived in the Panther Mountain Formation of New York State during the Middle Devonian period. The genus contains a single species, Dracochela deprehendor.

It is known from fragments of the cuticle from nymphs. Its full name translates to “dragon claw who takes by surprise”.
