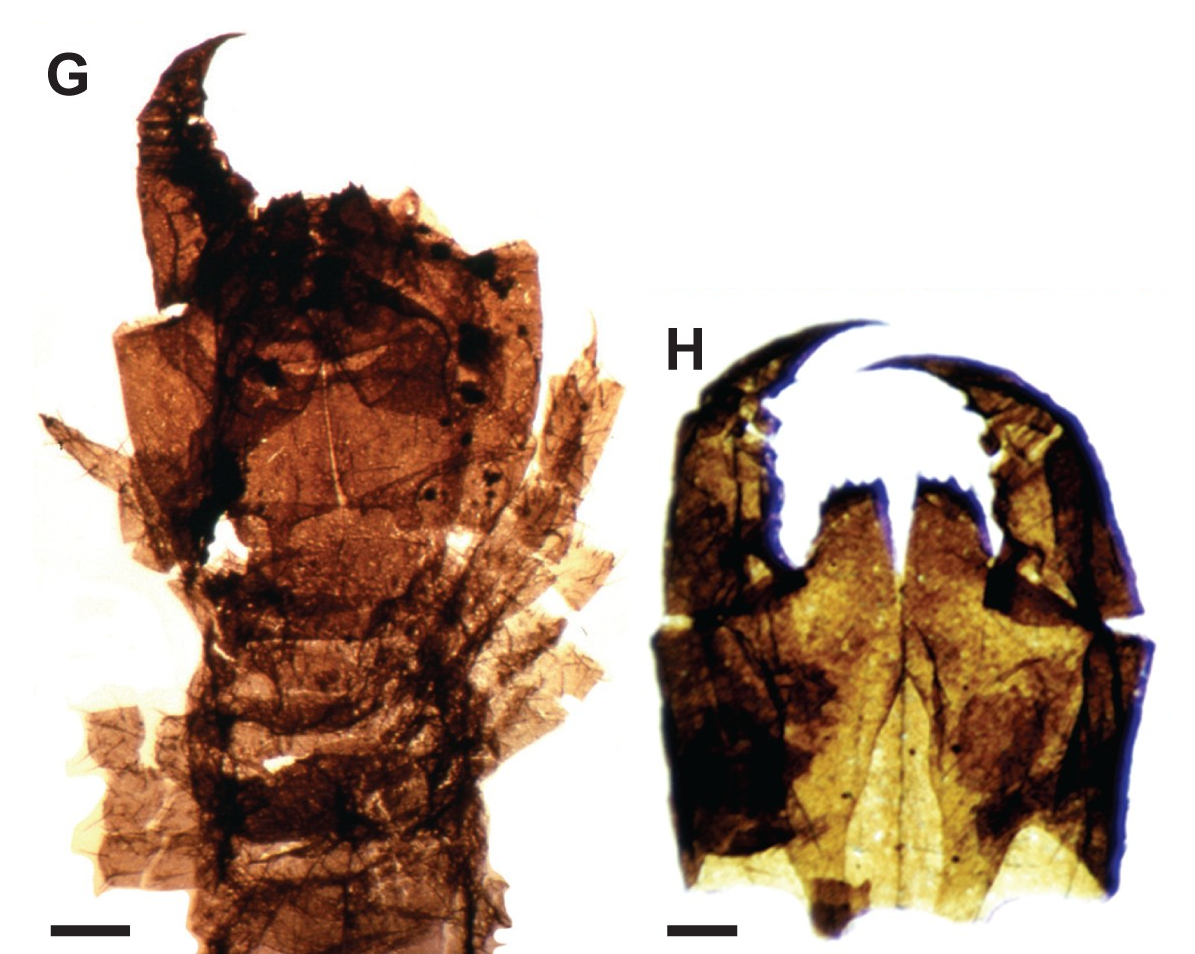
- Fossil specimens of Devonobius
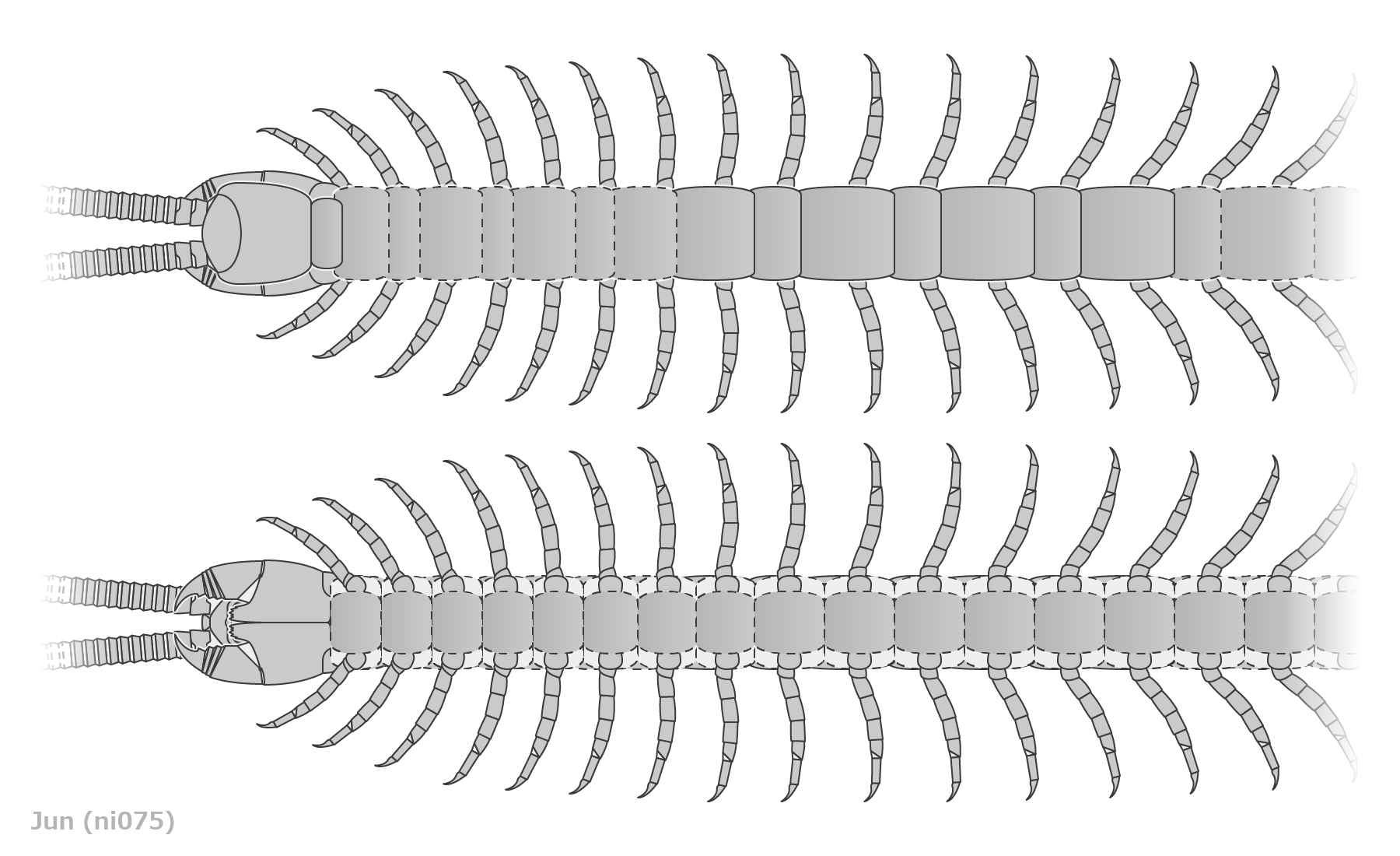
- Diagram of known parts of Devonobius

Scientific classification
- Domain: Eukaryota
- Kingdom: Animalia
- Phylum: Arthropoda
- Subphylum: Myriapoda
- Class: Chilopoda
- Order: †Devonobiomorpha; Shear & Bonamo, 1988
- Family: †Devonobiidae; Shear & Bonamo, 1988
- Genus: †Devonobius; Shear & Bonamo, 1988
- Species: †D. delta

Binomial name
- †Devonobius delta Shear & Bonamo, 1988

= Devonobius =

Devonobius Temporal range: Givetian

Extinct genus of centipede

Devonobius is an extinct genus of Devonian centipedes from the Panther Mountain Formation of New York, and the only member of the order Devonobiomorpha, and the family Devonobiidae. The genus contains a single species, Devonobius delta, known from at least thirty specimens from the aforementioned location in New York.

== Description ==
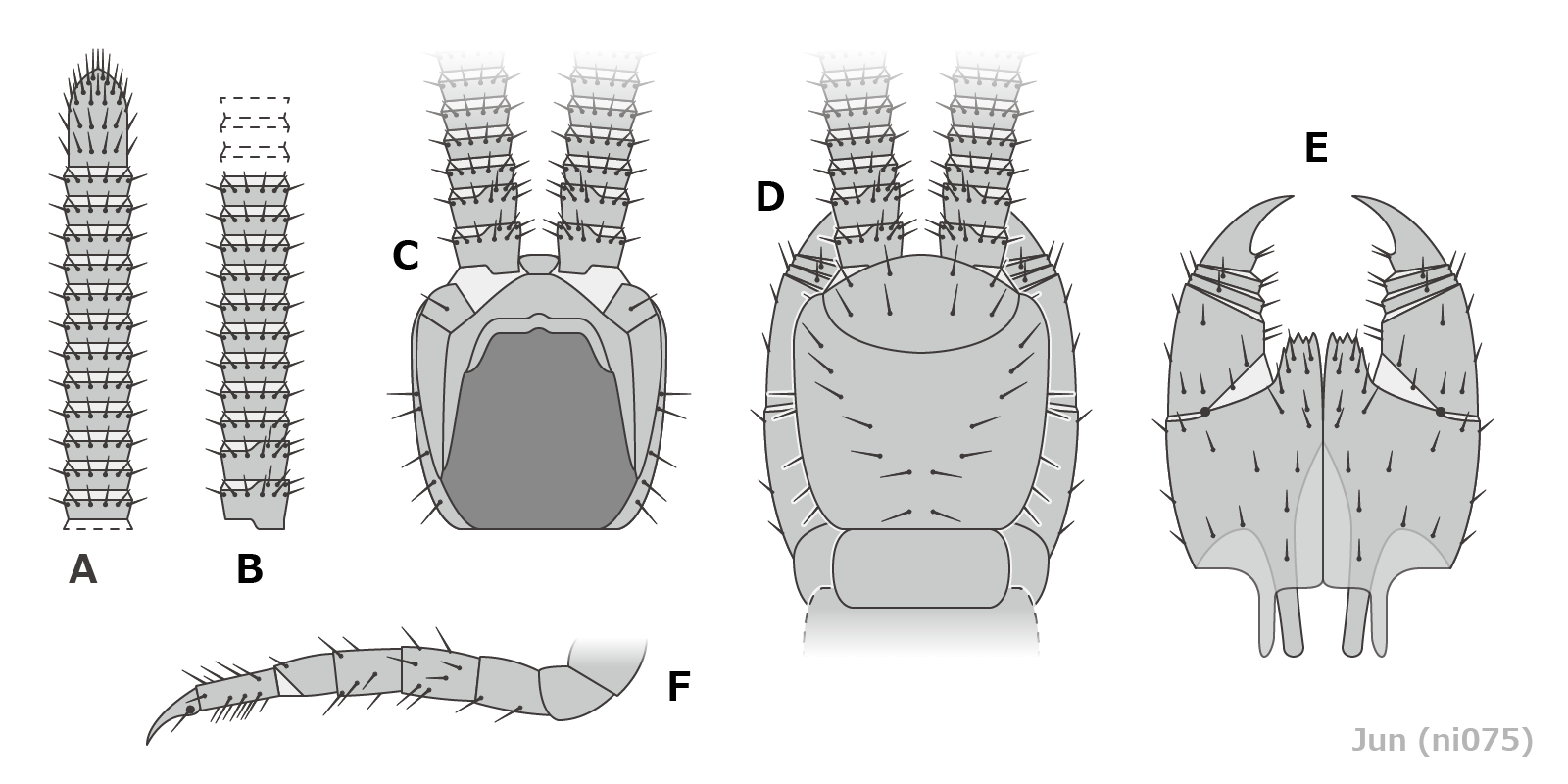
Body parts of Devonobius

Devonobius is known from several fragmentary specimens, mostly consisting of the head and maxillipeds. However, a few specimens have preserved body segments, with one preserving at least 14, although even this specimen is incomplete. It had at least 14 antennal segments, however the preserved antennae are also incomplete. Devonobius was likely small, under 1 cm (0.39 in) long, however as aforementioned the body is incomplete. It is distinguished from other centipedes by various coxosternal features on the maxillipeds, such as the lack of lateral division, and among modern centipede orders it is likely close to Craterostigmomorpha. The head lacks eyes and a Tömösváry organ, with the maxillipeds robust and mandibles moderately reduced. As no genitals are preserved, the sex of any individuals is unclear, however one specimen shows more robust maxillipeds, similar to those of male lithobiomorphs.

== Ecology ==
The ventral apodemes of Devonobius suggest it was adapted to prey on relatively large animals, due to them pulling the maxillipeds away and allowing the other mouthparts to contact with larger food items. The most complete specimen shows prominent heterotergy, likely an adaptation for flexibility and living in tight spaces.

== Etymology ==
The name Devonobius derives from the Devonian and the suffix "-bius" commonly used for centipedes. The specific name delta refers to the Catskill Delta of the Devonian, where the species lived.
