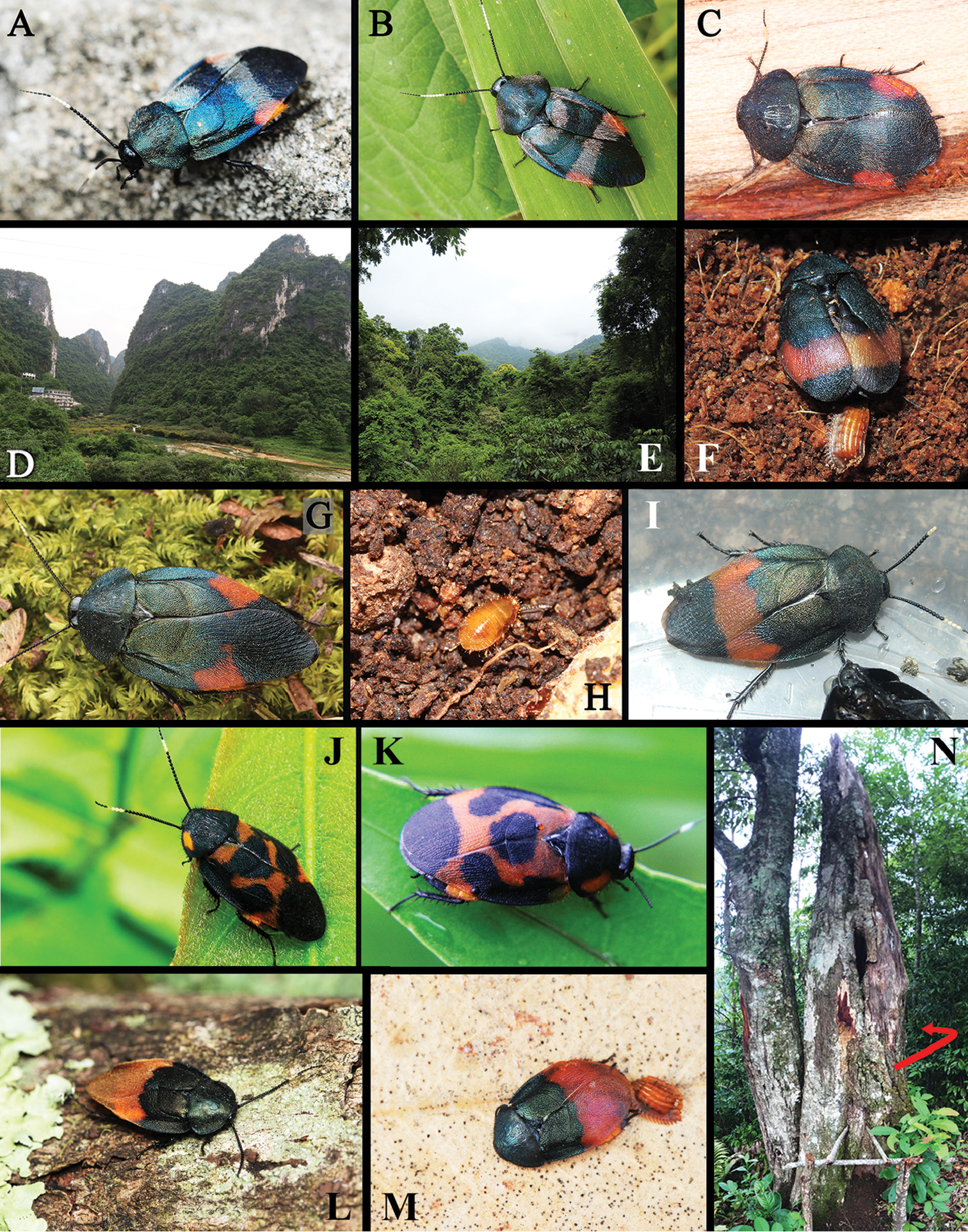
- Eucorydia spp. and habitats

Scientific classification
- Kingdom: Animalia
- Phylum: Arthropoda
- Clade: Pancrustacea
- Class: Insecta
- Order: Blattodea
- Family: Corydiidae
- Genus: Eucorydia; Hebard, 1929

Species
- (see text)

= Eucorydia =

Genus of cockroaches

Eucorydia is a genus of cockroaches. Species are found in Asia. They are characterized by a metallic greenish-bluish pronotum and sometimes orange markings on the tegmina and/or abdomen.

== Species list ==
Eucorydia has 23 species since 2021.

- Eucorydia aenea (Brunner von Wattenwyl, 1865)
- Eucorydia asahinai Yanagisawa et al., 2021
- Eucorydia coerulea (Shelford 1906)
- Eucorydia dasytoides (Walker, 1868)
- Eucorydia donanensis Yanagisawa, Sakamaki &Shimano, 2021
- Eucorydia forceps (Hanitsch 1915)
- Eucorydia gemma Hebard 1929
- Eucorydia guilinensis Qiu, Che, & Wang, 2017
- Eucorydia hilaris (Kirby, W. F. 1903)
- Eucorydia linglong Qiu, Che, & Wang, 2017
- Eucorydia maxwelli (Hanitsch, 1915)
- Eucorydia miyakoensis Yanagisawa, Sakamaki &Shimano, 2021
- Eucorydia multimaculata Bruijning 1948
- Eucorydia ornata (Saussure 1864)
- Eucorydia pilosa Qiu, Che, & Wang, 2017
- Eucorydia purpuralis (Kirby, W. F. 1903)
- Eucorydia tangi Qiu, Che, & Wang, 2017
- Eucorydia tokarensis Yanagisawa, Sakamaki &Shimano, 2021
- Eucorydia tristis Hanitsch 1929
- Eucorydia westwoodi (Gerstaecker 1861)
- Eucorydia xizangensis Woo & P. Feng 1988
- Eucorydia yasumatsui Asahina 1971
- Eucorydia yunnanensis Woo, Guo & P. Feng 1986
