= Venom gland =

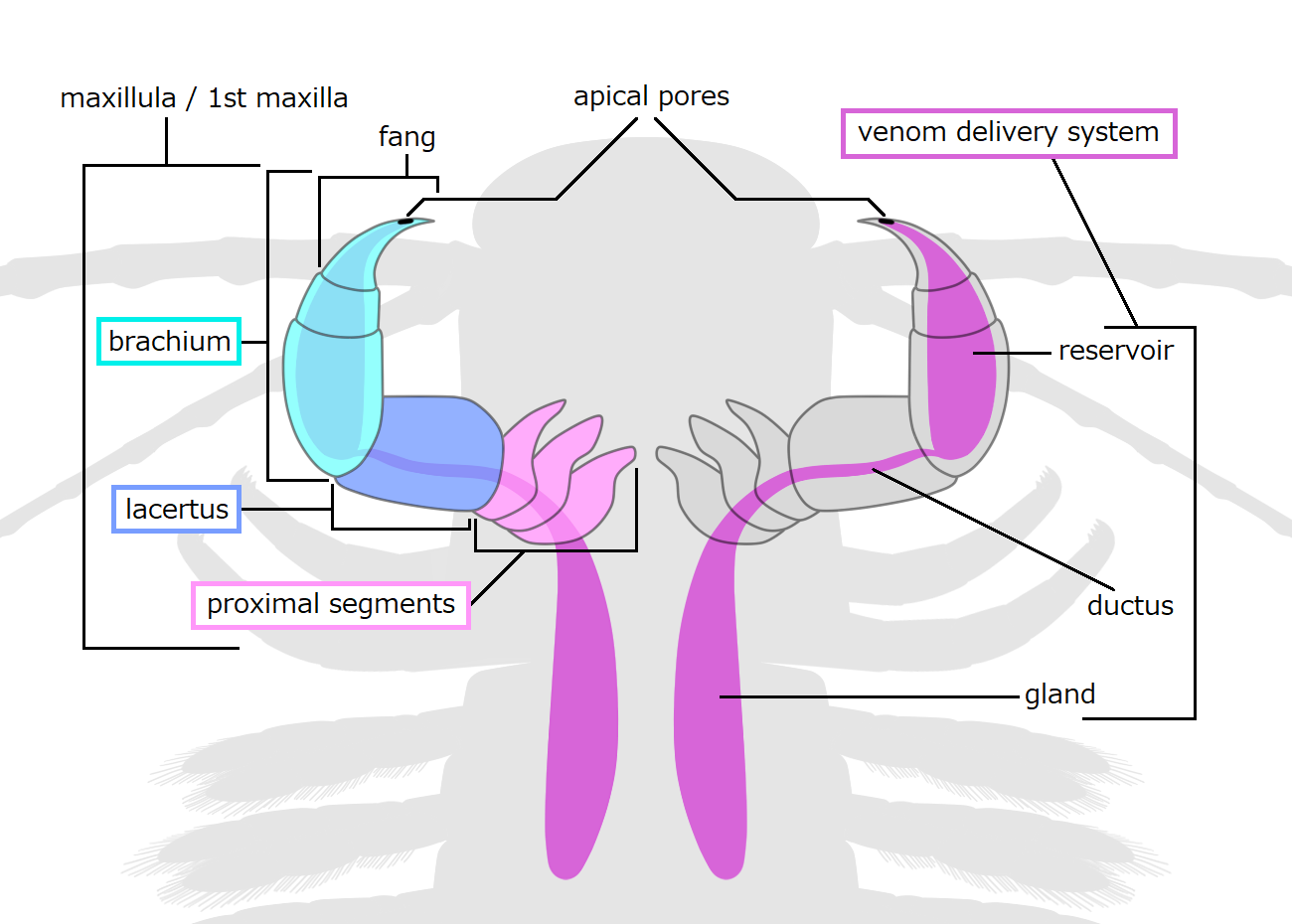
Example of an arthropod's venom glands as seen in Remipedia Nectiopoda

Venom glands are a wide variety of salivary glands in insects and reptiles modified to produce venom and store it without harm to the organism itself.

== Details ==
In reptiles the glands are characterized by their ability to synthesize venom, store venom for long periods of time, stabilize the venom while in the gland itself, and rapidly activate the toxin upon deployment from the gland. In insects however, specifically some parasitoid insects in the genus Hymenoptera, the venom gland has been shown to have additional functions such as the regulation of the immune response, paralysis, castration, and developmental alteration of the parasite's host.
