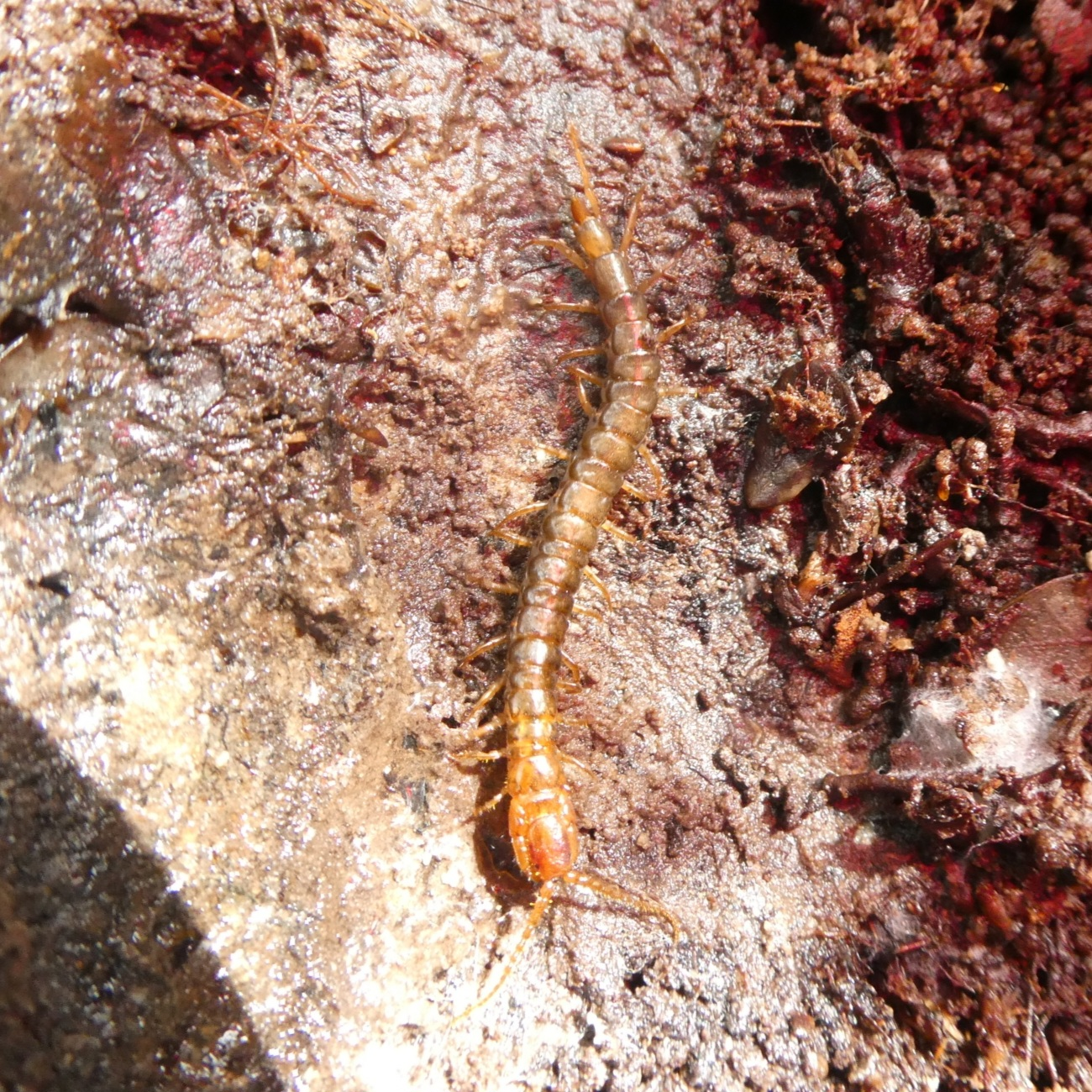
- Craterostigmus crabilli

Scientific classification
- Kingdom: Animalia
- Phylum: Arthropoda
- Subphylum: Myriapoda
- Class: Chilopoda
- Clade: Phylactometria
- Order: Craterostigmomorpha; Pocock, 1902

Families
- Craterostigmidae

= Craterostigmomorpha =

Order of centipedes

The Craterostigmomorpha are the least diverse centipede clade, comprising only two extant species, both in the genus Craterostigmus.

== Distribution ==
Their geographic range is restricted to Tasmania and New Zealand, with one species in each area.

== Description ==
There is a single ocellus on each side of the head capsule. They have a distinct body plan; their anamorphosis comprises a single stage: in their first moult, they grow from having 12 trunk segments to having 15. Adult centipedes in this order, like those in Scutigeromorpha and Lithobiomorpha, have 15 leg-bearing segments.

== Evolution ==
Their low diversity and intermediate position between the primitive anamorphic centipedes and the derived Epimorpha has led to them being likened to the platypus. They represent the survivors of a once diverse clade. Maternal brooding unites the Craterostigmomorpha with the Epimorpha into the clade Phylactometria which includes Craterostigmomorpha, Scolopendromorpha, and Geophilomorpha. This trait is thought to be closely linked with the presence of sternal pores, which secrete sticky or noxious secretions, which mainly serve to repel predators and parasites. The presence of these pores on the Devonian Devonobius, which is included in its own order, Devonobiomorpha, permits its inclusion in this clade, allowing its divergence of Lithobiomorpha from Phylactometria to be dated to 375 (or more) million years ago.
