= Eucorydia miyakoensis =

Scientific classification
- Domain: Eukaryota
- Kingdom: Animalia
- Phylum: Arthropoda
- Class: Insecta
- Order: Blattodea
- Family: Corydiidae
- Genus: Eucorydia
- Species: E. miyakoensis

Binomial name
- Eucorydia miyakoensis Yanagisawa, Sakamaki, and Shimano, 2021

Species of first

Eucorydia miyakoensis is a species of cockroach first discovered on Miyako Island, in Japan's Ryukyu Archipelago, in 2021. It is found exclusively in the forests of Miyako Island, where it lives in the forest floor's leaf litter and humus.

== Appearance ==
Eucorydia miyakoensis males grow between 12.5 and 13 mm in length. It has a distinct orange band on its upper wings. The antennae are shiny and black, and divided into 36–38 segments.
