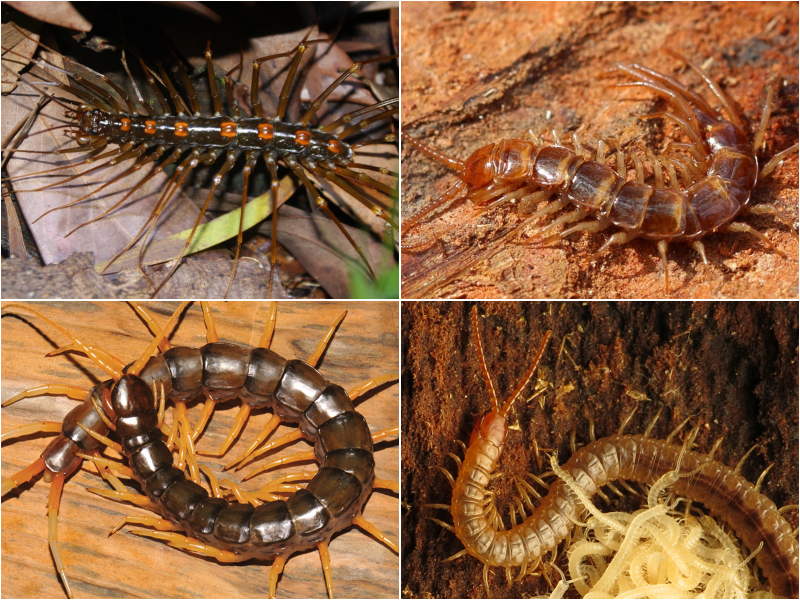
- Various centipedes (clockwise from top left): Thereuopoda clunifera, a scutigeromorph; Lithobius forficatus, a lithobiomorph; Geophilus, a geophilomorph; and Scolopendra cataracta, a scolopendromorph

Scientific classification
- Kingdom: Animalia
- Phylum: Arthropoda
- Subphylum: Myriapoda
- Class: Chilopoda; Latreille, 1817

Orders and suborders
- Notostigmophora; Scutigeromorpha; Pleurostigmophora; Lithobiomorpha; Craterostigmomorpha; †Devonobiomorpha; Scolopendromorpha; Geophilomorpha; Adesmata; Placodesmata

= Centipede =

Centipede Temporal range: 430–0 Ma Late Silurian to present

Many-legged arthropods with elongated bodies

Centipedes (from Neo-Latin centi- 'hundred' and Latin pes, pedis 'foot') are predatory arthropods belonging to the class Chilopoda (Note: from Ancient Greek χεῖλος, kheilos 'lip' and Neo-Latin suffix -poda 'foot', describing the forcipules) of the subphylum Myriapoda, an arthropod group which includes millipedes and other multi-legged animals. Centipedes are elongated segmented (metameric) animals with one pair of legs per body segment. All centipedes are venomous and can inflict painful stings, injecting their venom through pincer-like appendages known as forcipules or toxicognaths, which are actually modified front legs instead of fangs. Despite the name, no species of centipede has exactly 100 legs; the number of pairs of legs is an odd number that ranges from 15 pairs to 191 pairs. Less common names include "forty-legs" and "hundred-legs".

Centipedes are predominantly generalist carnivores, hunting for a variety of prey items that can be overpowered. They have a wide geographical range, which can be found in terrestrial habitats from tropical rainforests to deserts. Within these habitats, centipedes require a moist microhabitat because they lack the waxy cuticle of insects and arachnids, causing them to rapidly lose water. Accordingly, they avoid direct sunlight by staying under cover or by being active at night.

== Description ==
Centipedes have a rounded or flattened head, bearing a pair of antennae at the forward margin. They have a pair of elongated mandibles, and two pairs of maxillae. The first pair of maxillae form the lower lip, and bear short palps. The first pair of limbs stretch forward from the body over the mouth. These limbs, or forcipules, end in sharp claws and include venom glands that help the animal to kill or paralyze its prey.

Their size ranges from a few millimetres in the smaller lithobiomorphs and geophilomorphs to about 30 cm (12 in) in the largest scolopendromorphs.

=== Sensory organs ===
Many species of centipedes lack eyes. Some lack one only, but some possess a variable number of ocelli (ommatidia), sometimes clustered together to form true compound eyes. However, these eyes are only capable of discerning light from dark, eliciting negative phototaxis, and provide no true vision of colours and shapes. In some species, the first pair of legs can function as sensory organs, similar to antennae; unlike the antennae of most other invertebrates, these point backwards. An unusual clustering of sensory organs found in some centipedes is the organ of Tömösváry. The organs, at the base of the antennae, consist of a disc-like structure and a central pore, with an encircling of sensitive cells. They are likely used for sensing vibrations, and may provide a weak form of hearing.

=== Forcipules ===
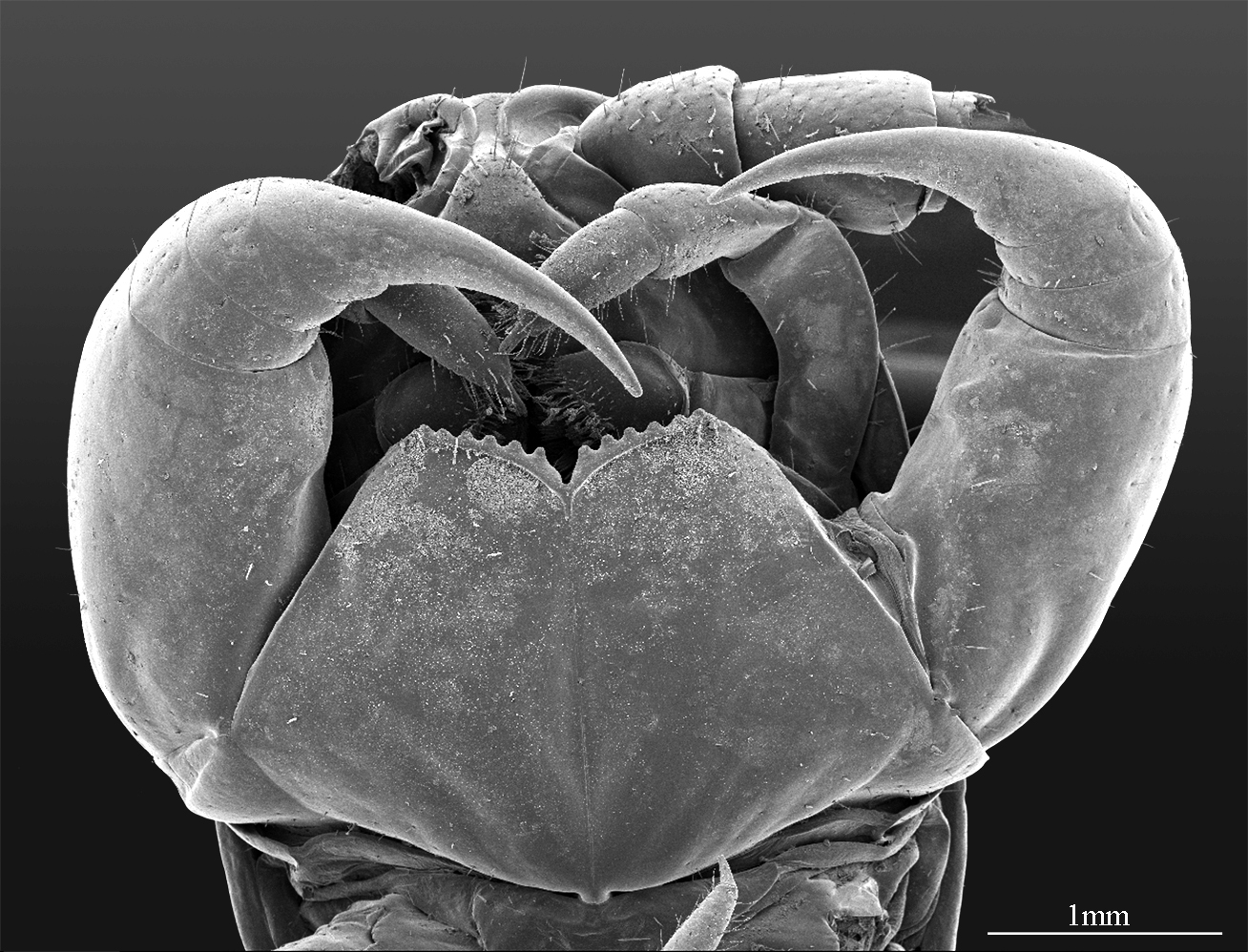
The forcipules of Eupolybothrus cavernicolus (Lithobiidae)

Forcipules are unique to centipedes. The forcipules are modifications of the first pair of legs (the maxillipeds), forming a pincer-like appendage, just behind the head. Forcipules are not oral mouthparts, though they are used to subdue prey by injecting venom and gripping the prey animal. Venom glands run through a tube, from inside the head to the tip of each forcipule.

=== Body ===
Behind the head, the body consists of at least fifteen segments. Most of the segments bear a single pair of legs; the maxillipeds project forward from the first body segment, while the final two segments are small and legless. Each pair of legs is slightly longer than the pair preceding them, ensuring that they do not overlap, which reduces the chance that they will collide and trip the animal. The last pair of legs may be as much as twice the length of the first pair. The final segment bears a telson, and includes the openings of the reproductive organs.

Centipedes mainly use their antennae to seek out their prey. The digestive tract forms a simple tube, with digestive glands attached to the mouthparts. Like insects, centipedes breathe through a tracheal system, typically with a pair of openings, or spiracles, on each body segment. The spiracles lead to long tracheae and tracheoles that mediate oxygen transport to the organs, except for Scutigeromorpha. In this order the spiracles are unpaired and the tracheae short, and oxygen supply is performed exclusively by the respiratory pigment hemocyanin. Some species are able to close their spiracles (occludable spiracles), and a few others in dry environments have evolved a waterproof cuticle. They excrete waste through a single pair of malpighian tubules.

=== Ultimate legs ===
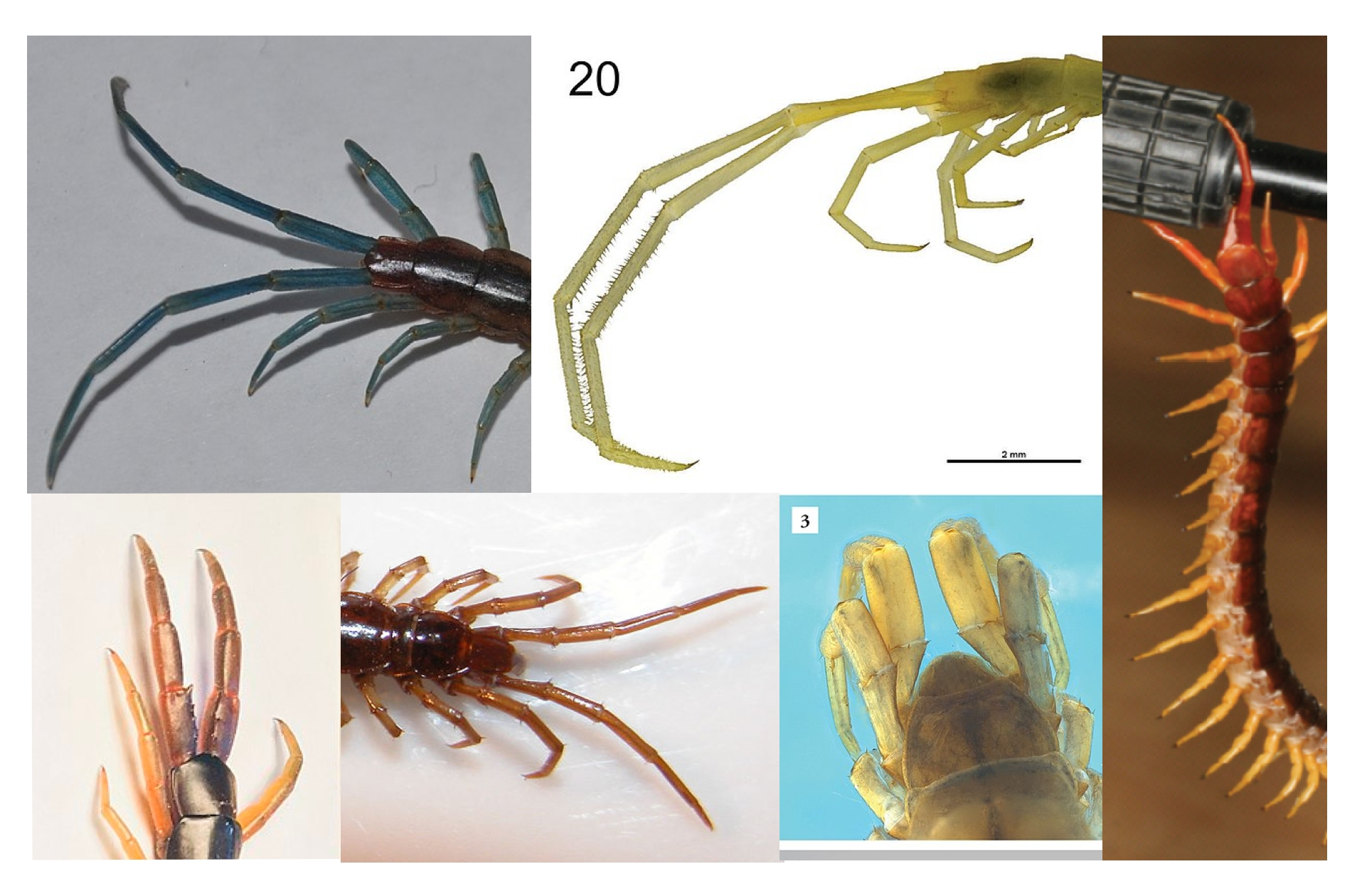
A collage showing the ultimate legs of various centipedes. From top left, proceeding clockwise: Rhysida spp., Scolopocryptops trogloclaudatus, Scolopendra dehaani, Lithobius proximus, Lithobius forficatus, Scolopendra cingulata.

Just as the first pair of legs are modified into forcipules, the back legs are modified into "ultimate legs", also called anal legs, caudal legs, and terminal legs. Their use varies between species, but does not include locomotion. The ultimate legs may be elongated and thin, thickened, or pincer-like. They are frequently sexually dimorphic, and may play a role in mating rituals. Because glandular pores occur more frequently on ultimate legs than on the "walking" legs, they may serve a sensory role. They are sometimes used in defensive postures, and some species use them to capture prey, defend themselves against predators, or suspend themselves from objects such as branches, using the legs as pincers. Several species use their ultimate legs upon encountering another centipede, trying to grab the body of the other centipede.

Members of the genus Alipes can stridulate their leaf-like ultimate legs to distract or threaten predators. Rhysida immarginata togoensis makes a faint creaking sound when it swings its ultimate legs.

=== Distinction from millipedes ===
There are many differences between millipedes and centipedes. Both groups of myriapods have long, multi-segmented bodies, many legs, a single pair of antennae, and the presence of postantennal organs. Centipedes have one pair of legs per segment, while millipedes have two. Their heads differ in that millipedes have short, elbowed antennae, a pair of robust mandibles and a single pair of maxillae fused into a lip; centipedes have long, threadlike antennae, a pair of small mandibles, two pairs of maxillae and a pair of large venom claws.

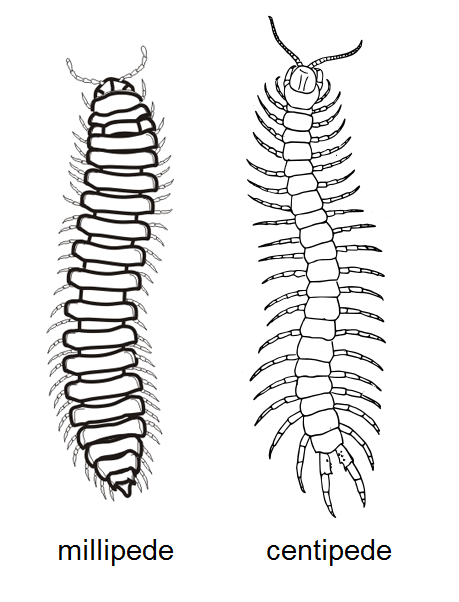
A representative millipede and centipede (not necessarily to scale)

Millipede versus centipede differences
Trait	Millipedes	Centipedes
Legs	Two pairs on most body segments; attached to underside of body	One pair per body segment; attached to sides of body; last pair extends backwards
Locomotion	Generally adapted for burrowing or inhabiting small crevices; slow-moving	Generally adapted for running, except for the burrowing soil centipedes
Feeding	Primarily detritivores, some herbivores, few carnivores; no venom	Primarily carnivores with front legs modified into venomous fangs
Spiracles	On underside of body	On the sides or top of body
Reproductive openings	Third body segment	Last body segment
Reproductive behaviour	Male generally inserts spermatophore into female, using his gonopods	Male produces spermatophore that is usually picked up by female

== Life cycle ==
=== Reproduction ===
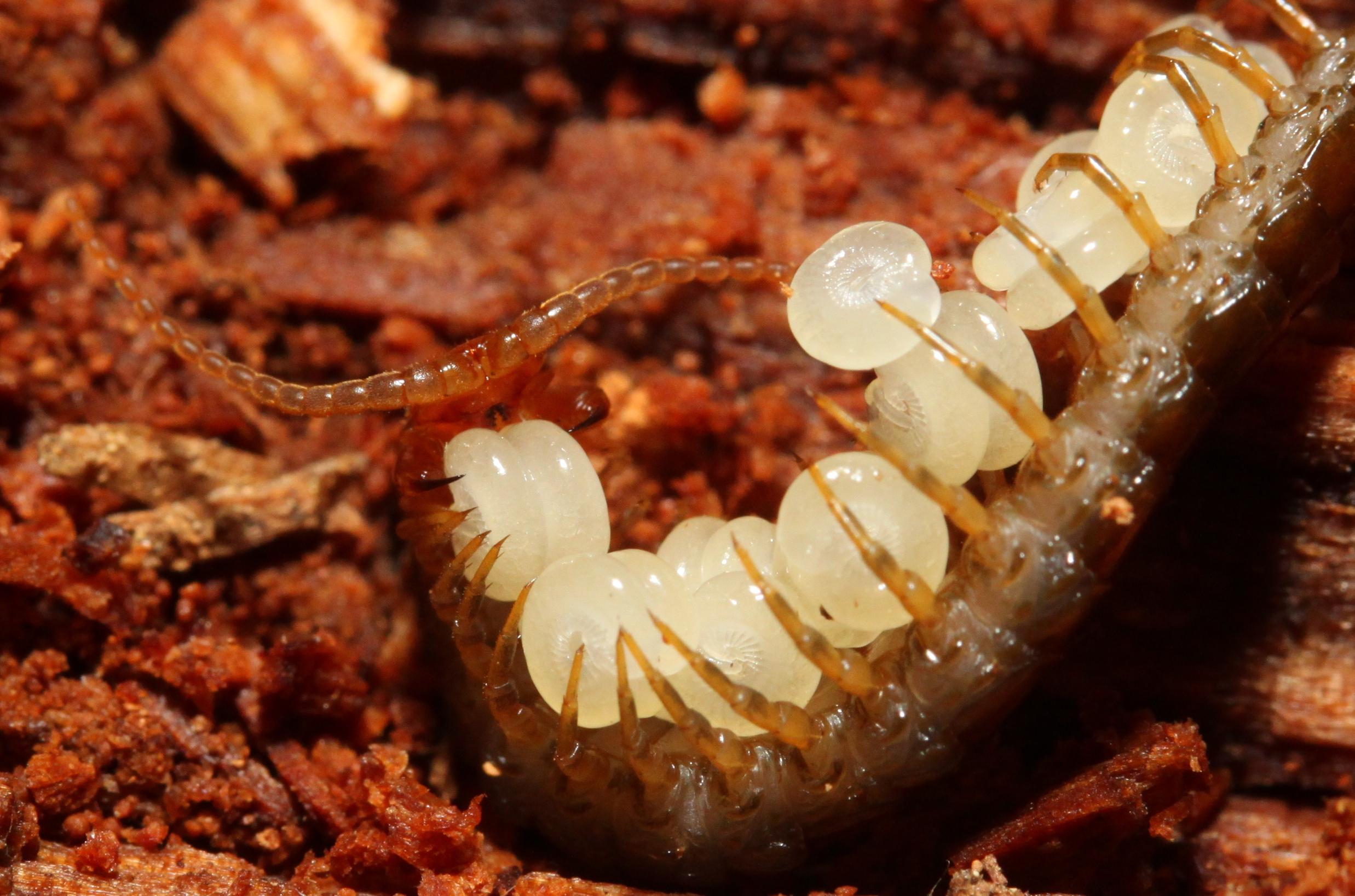
A centipede mother protecting her first instar offspring

Centipede reproduction does not involve copulation. Males deposit a spermatophore for the female to take up. In temperate areas, egg laying occurs in spring and summer. A few parthenogenetic species are known. Females provide parental care, both by curling their bodies around eggs and young, and by grooming them, probably to remove fungi and bacteria.

Centipedes are longer-lived than insects; life span is about 5–6 years for Lithobius mutabilis and 4–5 years for Lithobius curtipes. The combination of a small number of eggs laid, long gestation period, and long time of development to reproduction has led authors to label lithobiomorph centipedes as K-selected.

=== Development ===
Centipedes grow their legs at different points in their development. In the primitive condition, seen in the orders Lithobiomorpha, Scutigeromorpha, and Craterostigmomorpha, development is anamorphic: more segments and pairs of legs are grown at each moult. For example, Scutigera coleoptrata, the house centipede, hatches first with only four pairs of legs and in successive moults has 5, 7, 9, 11, 15, 15, 15 and 15 pairs respectively, before becoming a sexually mature adult. Life stages with fewer than 15 pairs of legs are called larval stadia (there are about five stages). After the full complement of legs is achieved, the now postlarval stadia (about five more stages) develop gonopods, sensory pores, more antennal segments, and more ocelli. All mature lithobiomorph centipedes have 15 leg-bearing segments. The Craterostigmomorpha only have one phase of anamorphosis, with embryos having 12 pairs, and adults 15.

The clade Epimorpha, consisting of the orders Geophilomorpha and Scolopendromorpha, is epimorphic, meaning that all pairs of legs are developed in the embryonic stages, and offspring do not develop more legs between moults. This clade contains the longest centipedes. In the Geophilomorpha, the number of thoracic segments usually varies within species, often on a geographical basis, and in most cases, females bear more legs than males. The number of leg-bearing segments varies within each order (usually 21 or 23 in the Scolopendromorpha; from 27 to 191 in the Geophilomorpha), but the total number of pairs is always odd, so there are never exactly 100 legs or 100 pairs, despite the group's common name.

Centipede segments are developed in two phases. Firstly, the head gives rise to a fixed but odd number of segments, driven by Hox genes as in all arthropods. Secondly, pairs of segments are added at the tail (posterior) end by the creation of a prepattern unit, a double segment, which is then always divided into two. The repeated creation of these prepattern units is driven by an oscillator clock, implemented with the Notch signalling pathway. The segments are homologous with the legs of other arthropods such as trilobites; it would be sufficient for the Notch clock to run faster, as it does in snakes, to create more legs.

== Ecology ==
=== Diet ===
Centipedes are predominantly generalist predators, which means they are adapted to eat a broad range of prey, although varying with the environment. Common prey items include lumbricid earthworms, dipteran fly larvae, collembolans, and other centipedes. They are carnivorous; study of gut contents suggests that plant material is an unimportant part of their diets, although they eat vegetable matter when starved during laboratory experiments.

Species of Scolopendromorpha, noticeably members from the genera Scolopendra and Ethmostigmus, are able to hunt for substantial prey items, including large invertebrates and sizable vertebrates, which could be larger than the myriapod itself. For instance, Scolopendra gigantea (the Amazonian giant centipede) preys on tarantulas, scorpions, lizards, frogs, birds, mice, snakes, and even bats, catching them in midflight. Three species (Scolopendra cataracta, S. paradoxa, and S. alcyona) are amphibious, believed to hunt aquatic or amphibious invertebrates.

=== Predators ===
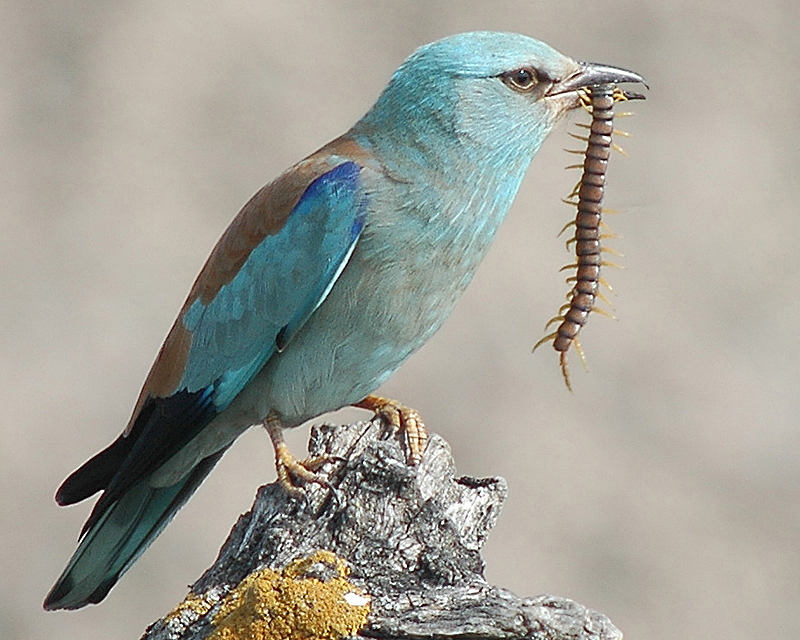
A centipede (Scolopendra cingulata) being eaten by a European roller

Many larger animals prey upon centipedes, such as mongooses, mice, salamanders, beetles and some specialist snake species. They form an important item of diet for many species and the staple diet of some such as the African ant Amblyopone pluto, which feeds solely on geophilomorph centipedes, and the South African Cape black-headed snake Aparallactus capensis.

=== Defences ===
Some geophilomorph, lithobiomorph, and scolopendromorph centipedes produce sticky, toxic secretions to defend themselves. The various secretions ward off or entangle predators. Scolopendromorph secretions contain hydrogen cyanide. Among geophilomorphs, the secretions of Geophilus vittatus are sticky and odorous, and contain hydrogen cyanide.

The giant desert centipede of Arizona, Scolopendra polymorpha, has a black head and tail, and an orange body; by comparison with studies made on other invertebrates this colour pattern might be an honest signal of its toxicity (aposematic coloration). Many species raise and splay their ultimate legs and display the spines found on the legs in a defensive threat posture.

=== Habitat and behaviour ===
Because centipedes lack the waxy water-resistant cuticle of other arthropods, they are more susceptible to water loss via evaporation. Thus, centipedes are most commonly found in high-humidity environments to avoid dehydration, and are mostly nocturnal.

Centipedes live in many different habitats including soil and leaf litter; they are found in environments as varied as tropical rainforests, deserts, and caves. Some geophilomorphs are adapted to littoral habitats, where they feed on barnacles.

=== Threatened species ===
According to the IUCN Red List, there are two vulnerable, six endangered, and three critically endangered centipede species. For example, the Serpent Island centipede (Scolopendra abnormis) is vulnerable, and Turk's earth centipede (Nothogeophilus turki) and the Seychelles long-legged centipede (Seychellonema gerlachi) are both endangered.

== Evolution ==
=== Fossil history ===
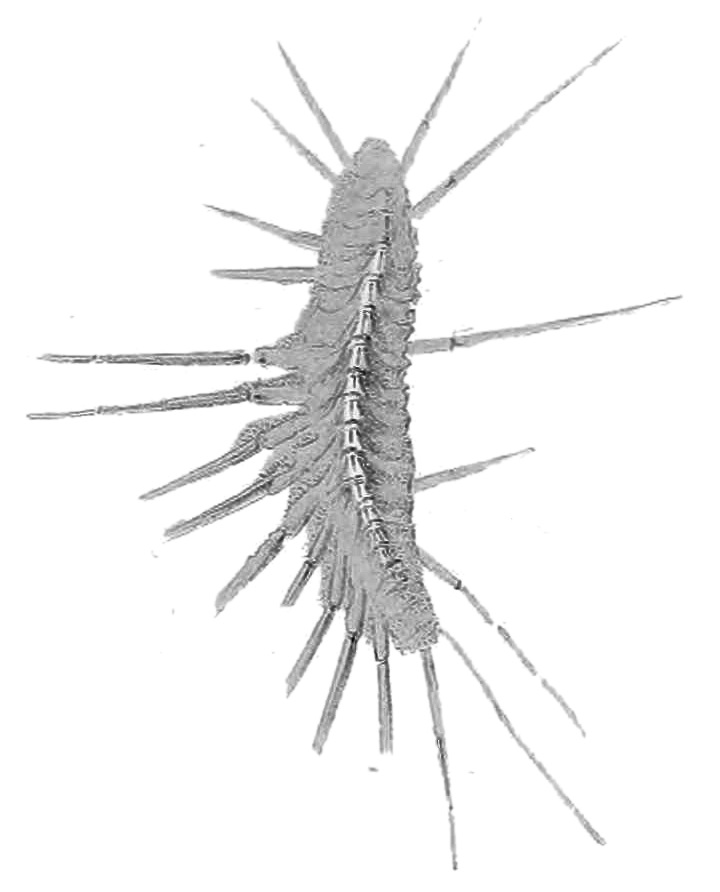
Latzelia, a Carboniferous scutigeromorph from the Mazon Creek fossil beds. 1890 illustration by J. H. Emerton

The fossil record of centipedes extends back to 430 million years ago, during the Late Silurian (Crussolum), though they are rare throughout the Paleozoic. The Devonian Panther Mountain Formation contains two species of centipede. One is a species of the scutigeromorph Crussolum. The other is Devonobius, which is included in the extinct group Devonobiomorpha. Another Devonian site, the Rhynie chert, also bears Crussolum fossils, and possible scutigeromorph head material. Rhyniognatha, which was once thought to be the oldest insect fossil, is also found in the Rhynie chert. Three species, one scutigeromorph (Latzelia) and two scolopendromorphs (Mazoscolopendra and the poorly known Palenarthrus), have been described from the Mazon Creek fossil beds, which are Carboniferous, 309–307 mya. More species appear in the Mesozoic, including scolopendromorphs and scutigeromorphs in the Cretaceous.

=== External phylogeny ===
The following cladogram shows the position of the Chilopoda within the arthropods as of 2019:

- Arthropoda
  - Chelicerata
    inc. horseshoe crabs and spiders
  - Mandibulata
    - Myriapoda
      - Chilopoda
      - millipedes and allies
    - Pancrustacea
      inc. crustaceans and insects

=== Internal phylogeny ===
Within the myriapods, centipedes are believed to be the first of the extant classes to branch from the last common ancestor. The five orders of centipedes are: Craterostigmomorpha, Geophilomorpha, Lithobiomorpha, Scolopendromorpha, and Scutigeromorpha. These orders are united into the clade Chilopoda by the following synapomorphies:

1. The first postcephalic appendage is modified to venom claws.
2. The embryonic cuticle on second maxilliped has an egg tooth.
3. The trochanter-prefemur joint is fixed.
4. A spiral ridge occurs on the nucleus of the spermatozoon.

The Chilopoda are then split into two clades: the Notostigmophora including the Scutigeromorpha and the Pleurostigmophora including the other four orders. The following physical and developmental traits can be used to separate members of the Pleurostigmomorpha from Notostigmomorpha:

- The spiracles are located on the sides of the centipede (in Notostigmomorphs, they are located dorsally).
- The spiracles are deep, more complex, and always present in pairs.
- The head is somewhat flatter.
- The centipedes can develop through either anamorphosis or epimorphosis.

It was previously believed that Chilopoda was split into Anamorpha (Lithobiomorpha and Scutigeromorpha) and Epimorpha (Geophilomorpha and Scolopendromorpha), based on developmental modes, with the relationship of the Craterostigmomorpha being uncertain. Recent phylogenetic analyses using combined molecular and morphological characters supports the previous phylogeny. The Epimorpha still exist as a monophyletic group within the Pleurostigmophora, but the Anamorpha are paraphyletic, as shown in the cladogram:

- Chilopoda
  - Notostigmophora
    Scutigeromorpha
  - Pleurostigmophora
    - Lithobiomorpha
    - Phylactometria
      - Craterostigmomorpha
      - Epimorpha
        - Scolopendromorpha
        - Geophilomorpha

=== Evolution of venom ===
All centipedes are venomous. Over the first 50 million years of the clade's evolutionary history, centipede venoms appear to have consisted of a simple cocktail of about four different components, and differentiation into specific venom types appears to have only occurred after the currently recognized five orders had developed. The evolution of the venom includes horizontal gene transfer, involving bacteria, fungi and oomycetes.

== Interaction with humans ==
=== As food ===
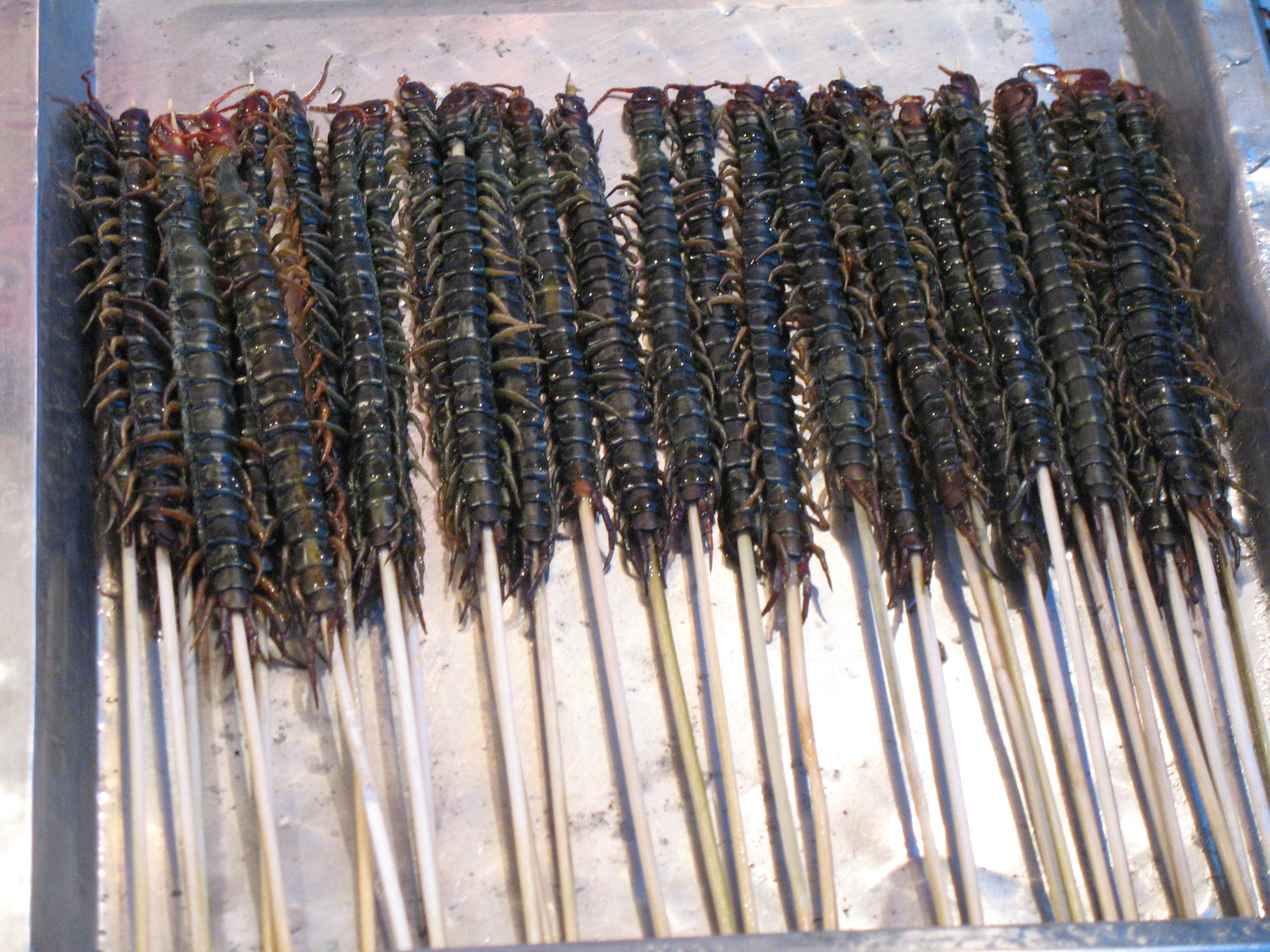
Centipedes on sticks as street food at Wangfujing market

As a food item, certain large centipedes are consumed in China, usually skewered and grilled or deep fried. They are often seen in street vendors' stalls in large cities, including Donghuamen and Wangfujing markets in Beijing.

Large centipedes are steeped in alcohol to make centipede vodka.

=== As drug ===
Centipedes are currently used in traditional Chinese medicine, in particular Scolopendra subspinipes mutilans, the Chinese red-headed centipede, known for its analgesic, anti-inflammatory, antimicrobial, antifungal, antioxidant, antitumor, antithrombotic, anti-fibrotic, and neuroprotective activities of venom and whole-body extracts. Recent studies provided experimental evidence to support the traditional use of Scolopendra subspinipes mutilans in treating cancer.

=== As hazard ===
Some species of centipedes can be hazardous to humans because of their bite. While a bite to an adult human is usually very painful and may cause severe swelling, chills, fever, and weakness, it is unlikely to be fatal. However, centiped bites can be dangerous to small children and those with allergies to bee stings. The venomous bite of larger centipedes can induce anaphylactic shock in such people. Smaller centipedes are generally incapable of piercing human skin.

Even small centipedes that cannot pierce human skin are considered frightening by some people due to their dozens of legs moving at the same time and their tendency to dart swiftly out of the darkness towards one's feet. A 19th-century Tibetan poet warned his fellow Buddhists, "if you enjoy frightening others, you will be reborn as a centipede."
