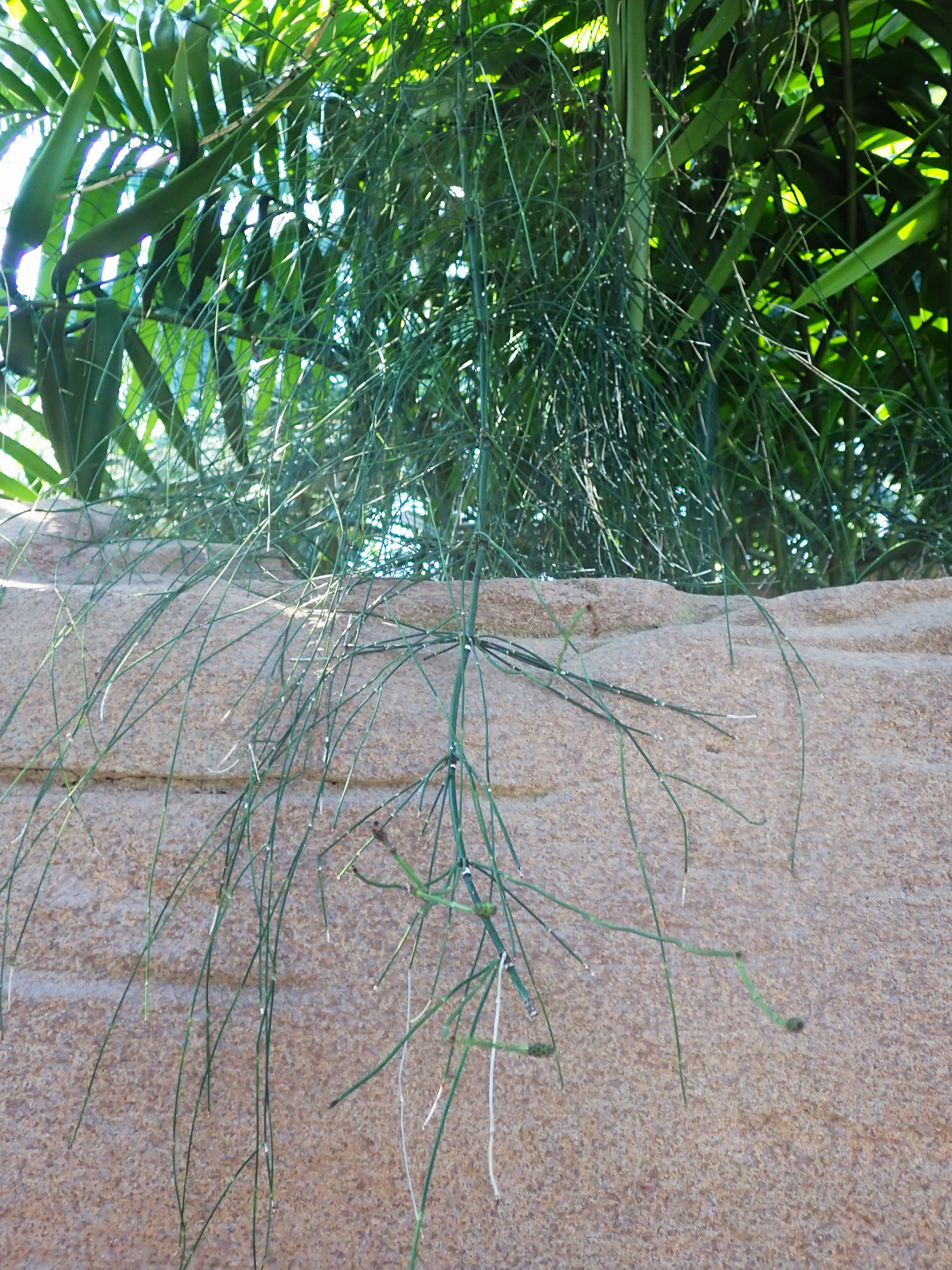

Scientific classification
- Kingdom: Plantae
- Clade: Tracheophytes
- Division: Polypodiophyta
- Class: Polypodiopsida
- Subclass: Equisetidae
- Order: Equisetales
- Family: Equisetaceae
- Genus: Equisetum
- Species: E. × schaffneri

Binomial name
- Equisetum × schaffneri Milde

Synonyms
- Hippochaete × schaffneri (Milde) Holub

= Equisetum × schaffneri =

Hybrid species of plant

Equisetum × schaffneri is a horsetail (family Equisetaceae) which is believed to be an ancient, naturally occurring, widely distributed hybrid between Equisetum giganteum and Equisetum myriochaetum, from the Neotropics.

== Description ==
The stems are up to 7 m tall, and 3–22 mm diameter, with 12-48 ridges. At each node there are up to 19 branchlets, each curving downward and then upward, and up to 45 cm long. The spore cones are terminal on the stems and branches, and are sterile.
