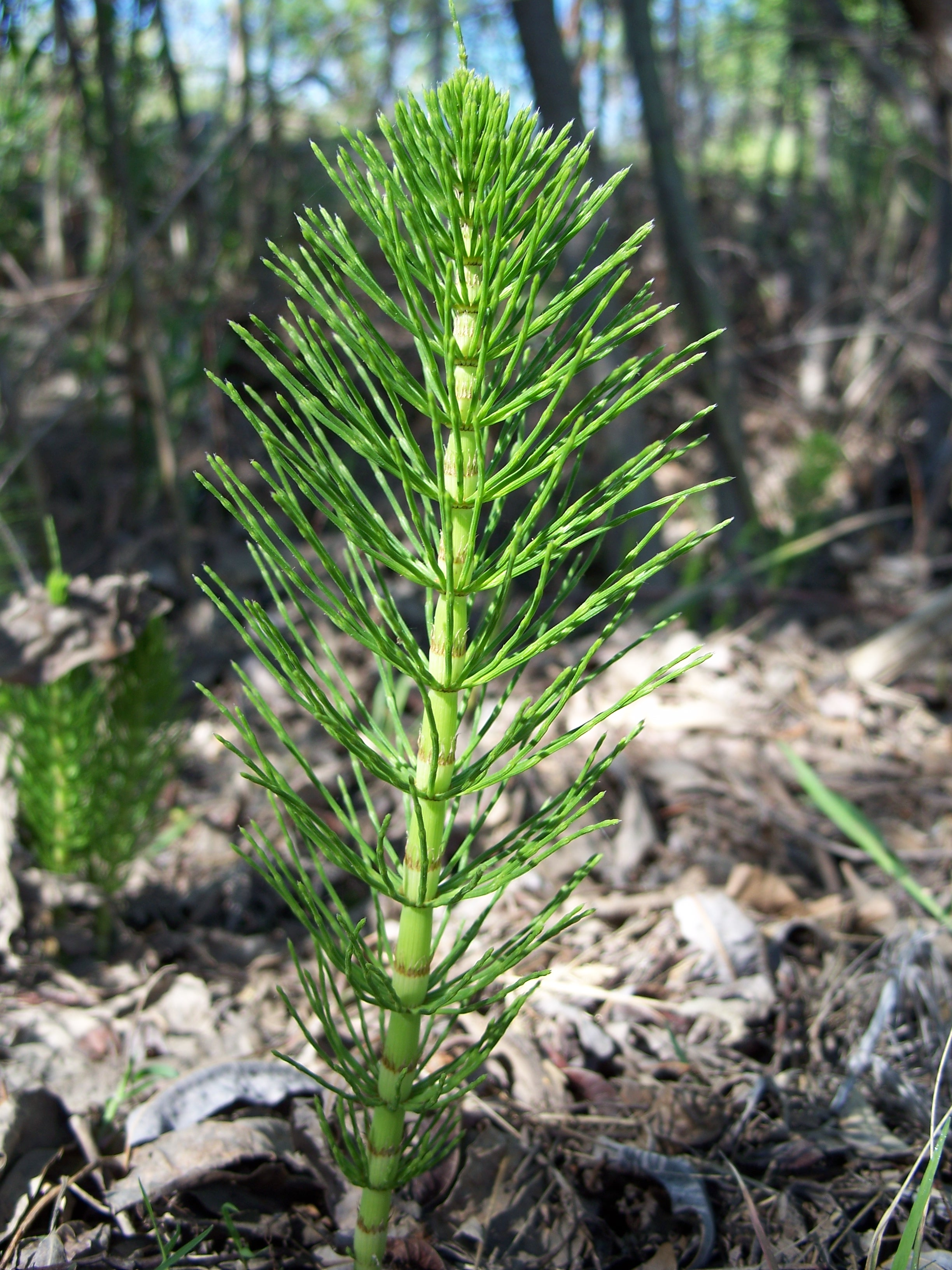
- Equisetum braunii at San Jose, California

Scientific classification
- Kingdom: Plantae
- Clade: Tracheophytes
- Division: Polypodiophyta
- Class: Polypodiopsida
- Subclass: Equisetidae
- Order: Equisetales
- Family: Equisetaceae
- Genus: Equisetum
- Subgenus: E. subg. Equisetum
- Species: E. braunii

Binomial name
- Equisetum braunii Milde

Synonyms
- Equisetum telmateia subsp. braunii (Milde) Hauke

= Equisetum braunii =

Species of plant in the horsetail family

Equisetum braunii, the northern giant horsetail, is a species of Equisetum (horsetail) native to western North America. It was formerly widely treated as a subspecies of the European species Equisetum telmateia, and still is by some authorities. It is often simply but ambiguously called "giant horsetail", but that name may just as well refer to the Latin American species Equisetum giganteum and Equisetum myriochaetum. The range extends from southeastern Alaska and western British Columbia south to California, mainly in coastal regions, but also inland to Idaho.

== Description ==
It is an herbaceous perennial plant, with separate green photosynthetic sterile stems, and pale yellowish non-photosynthetic spore-bearing fertile stems. The sterile stems, produced in late spring and dying down in late autumn, are 30–100 cm (12–39 in) (rarely to 200 cm (79 in)) tall and 1 cm (0.39 in) diameter, heavily branched, with whorls of 14–40 branches, these up to 20 cm (7.9 in) long, 1–2 mm (3/64–5/64 in) diameter and unbranched, emerging from the axils of a ring of bracts. The fertile stems are produced in early spring before the sterile shoots, growing to 17–45 cm (6.7–17.7 in) tall with an apical spore-bearing strobilus, and no side branches. The spores disperse in mid spring, with the fertile stems dying immediately after spore release. It also spreads by means of rhizomes, which grow up to 0.6–1.2 m (2 ft 0 in – 3 ft 11 in) deep. Unlike the similar E. telmateia, the main stems are green and photosynthetic.

== Habitat ==
It is found in damp places, spring fens and seepage lines.
