= Red Rocks (SSSI) =

Sand dunes and reed beds in Wirral, England

- Site of Special Scientific Interest
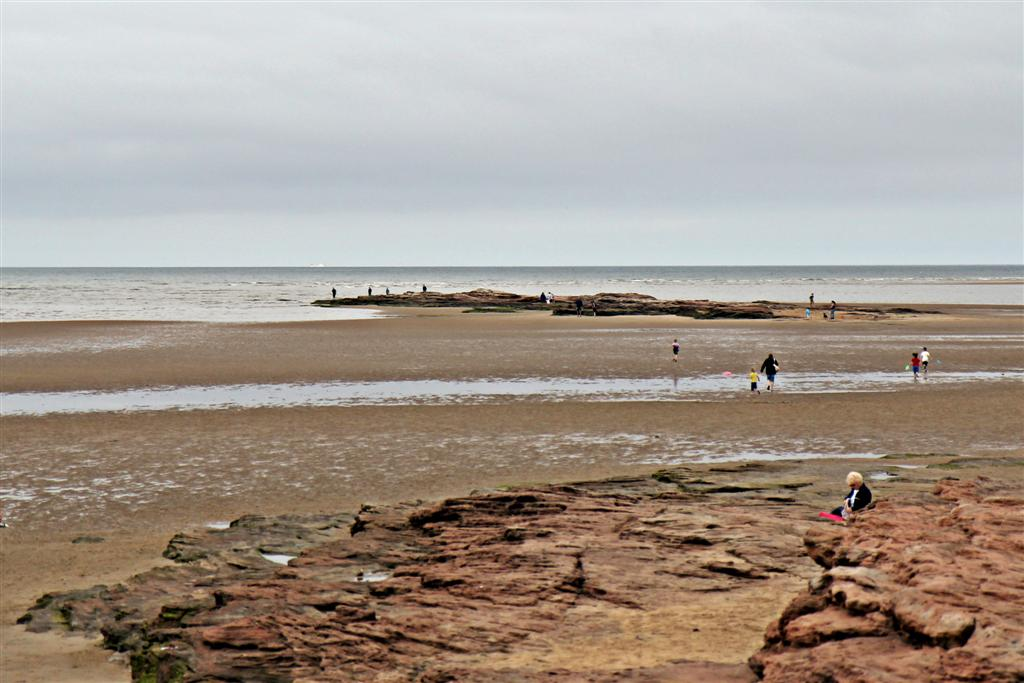

- Location within Merseyside
- Location of Red Rocks.
- Area of search: Merseyside
- Grid reference: SJ207878
- Coordinates: 53.389°N 3.199°W
- Interest: Biological
- Area: 11.38 ha (28.1 acres)
- Notification date: 1979 / 1983

Red Rocks (SSSI) is an area of sand dunes and reed beds at the mouth of the Dee Estuary and to the west of Hoylake on the Wirral Peninsula, England.

== Flora and fauna ==
The area is home to a variety of dune/reed plants the rarest of which was originally thought to be Mackay's horsetail, but has subsequently been re-identified as a new Equisetum hybrid with a very restricted distribution on north Wirral and Anglesey. This plant is found at the south end of the reserve along the edges of the dune slack.

The area is important for birds, with breeding reed warbler, sedge warbler and reed bunting in the reed bed, sallows and alders of the dune slack, common whitethroat, grasshopper warbler, skylark and European stonechats in the fixed dunes and their low scrub and burnet roses. 268 species of bird have been recorded, with up to 170 in a single year. The grasshopper warbler has recently been elevated to red status in the Birds of Conservation Concern list in 2007 whilst reed bunting has amber status.

The site is an important breeding site for natterjack toads, a breed common in mainland Europe, but rare in the UK. Natterjack toads are confined to the most seaward and brackish areas of the reserve, with common frog, common toad and smooth newt dominating in the freshwater habitats. Common lizard is abundant in the fore dunes. The extremely rare moth, the sandhill rustic, is localised in the fore dunes.
