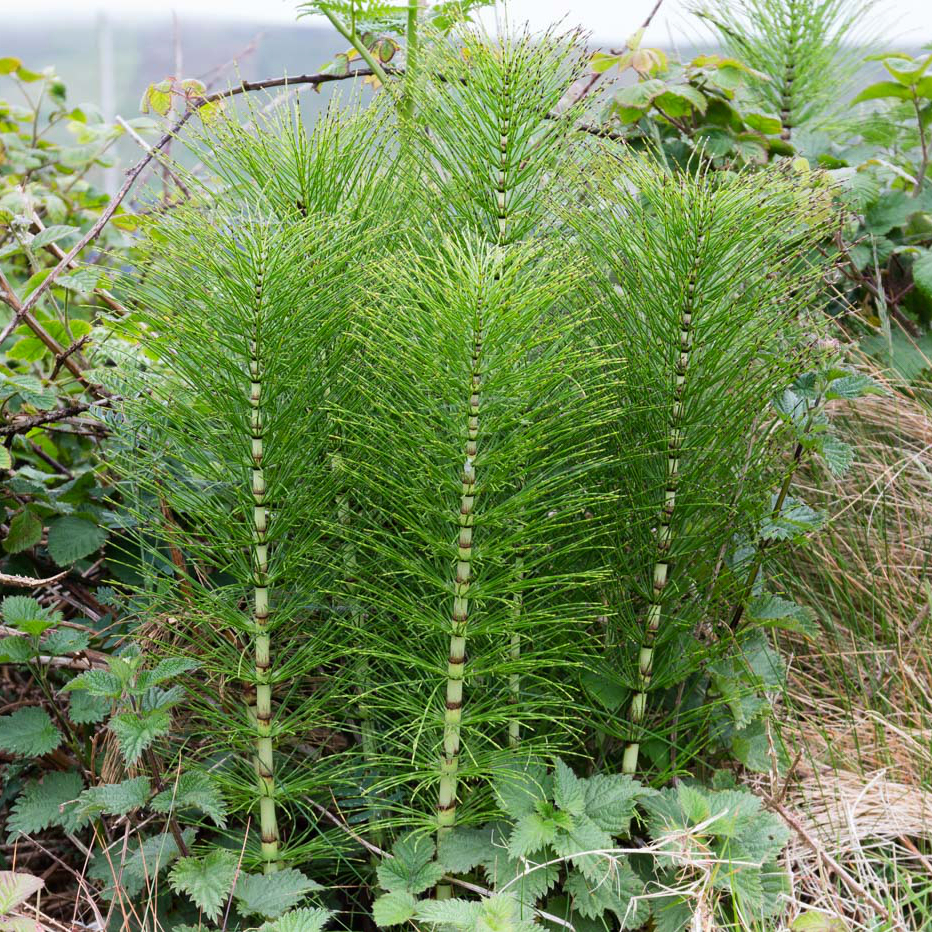
- Vegetative stems of Equisetum telmateia (great horsetail), showing whorls of branches and the tiny dark-tipped leaves

Scientific classification
- Kingdom: Plantae
- Clade: Tracheophytes
- Division: Polypodiophyta
- Class: Polypodiopsida
- Subclass: Equisetidae
- Order: Equisetales
- Family: Equisetaceae
- Genus: Equisetum; L.

Type species
- Equisetum arvense L.

Species
- See text

Synonyms
- Allostelites Börner; Hippochaete Milde

= Equisetum =

Equisetum Temporal range: Early Jurassic–present

Genus of vascular plants

Equisetum (/ˌɛkwɪˈsiːtəm/; horsetail) is the only living genus in Equisetaceae, a family of vascular plants that reproduce by spores rather than seeds. The oldest remains of modern Equisetum species first appear in the Early Jurassic.

The genus is near-cosmopolitan. In some areas the species are considered weeds or invasive. The plants are toxic, containing thiaminase, but have been prepared as food or folk medicine.

== Description ==
They are perennial plants, herbaceous and dying back in winter in most temperate species, or evergreen as most tropical species and the temperate species E. hyemale (rough horsetail), E. ramosissimum (branched horsetail), E. scirpoides (dwarf horsetail) and E. variegatum (variegated horsetail). They typically grow 20–150 centimetres (1/2–5 feet) tall, though the subtropical "giant horsetails" are alleged to grow even more than the recorded 8 metres (26 ft) in E. myriochaetum (Mexican giant horsetail) and 5 m (16 ft) in E. giganteum (southern giant horsetail).

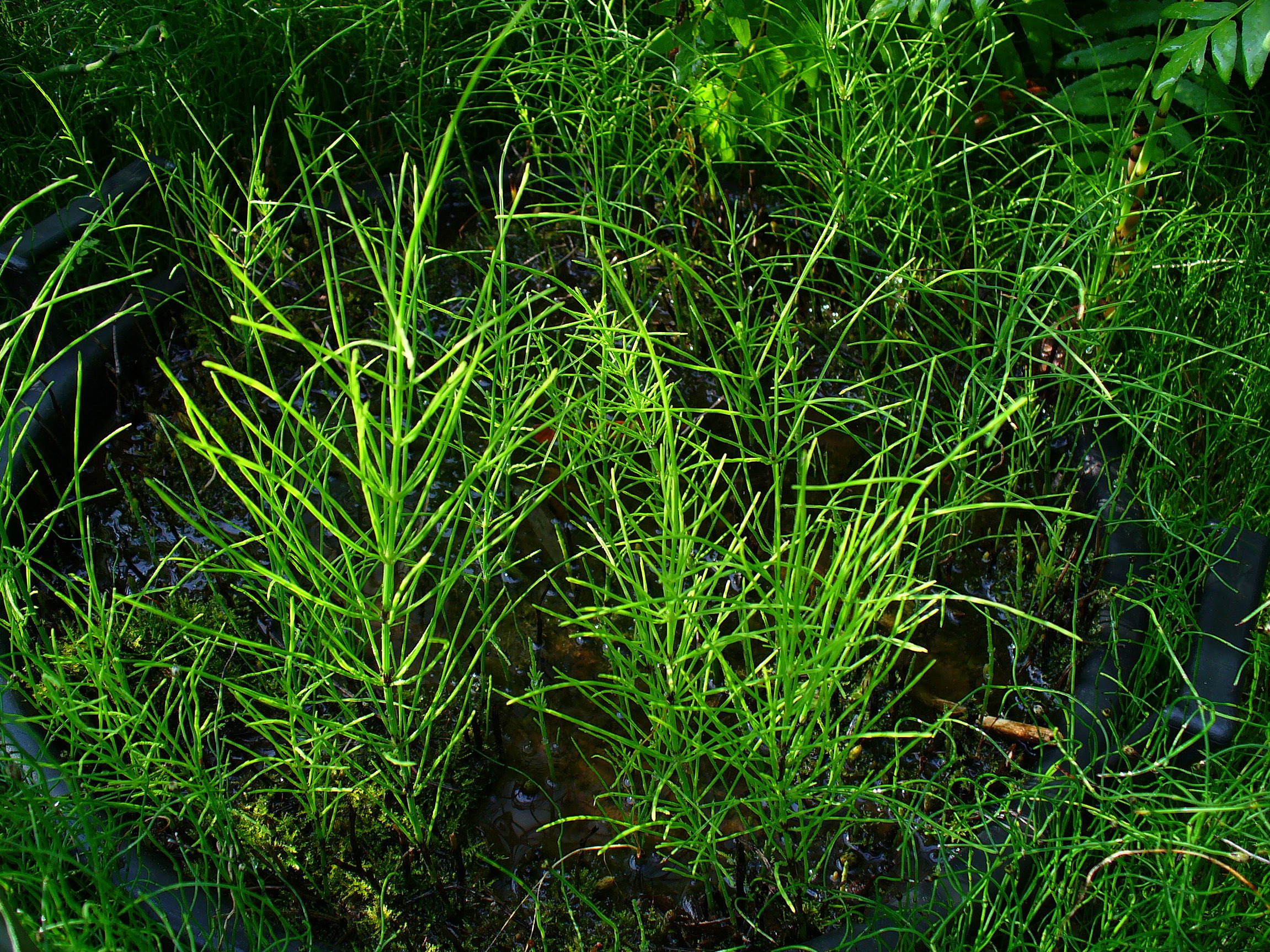
Equisetum arvense (field horsetail)

Equisetum leaves are greatly reduced and usually non-photosynthetic. They contain a single, non-branching vascular trace, which is the defining feature of microphylls. However, it has been recognised in 1999 that horsetail microphylls are probably not ancestral as in lycophytes (clubmosses and relatives), but rather derived adaptations, evolved by reduction of megaphylls.

The leaves of horsetails are arranged in whorls fused into nodal sheaths. The stems are usually green and photosynthetic, and are distinctive in being hollow, jointed and ridged (with sometimes 3 but usually 6–40 ridges). There may or may not be whorls of branches at the nodes. Unusually, the branches often emerge below the leaves in an internode, and grow from buds between their bases.

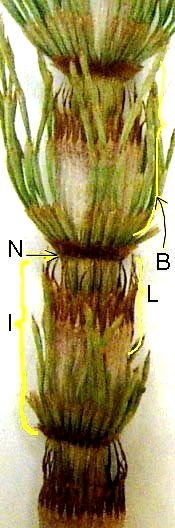
Vegetative stem: B = branch in whorl I = internode L = leaves N = node

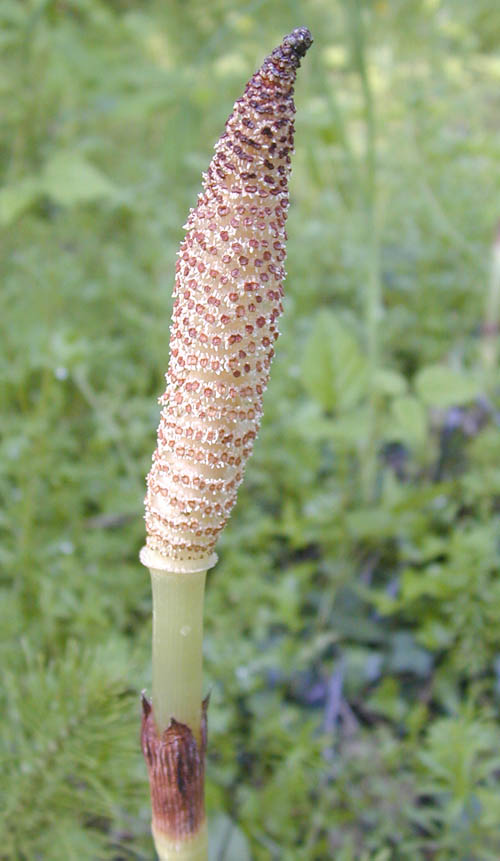
Strobilus of E. braunii on an unbranched stem

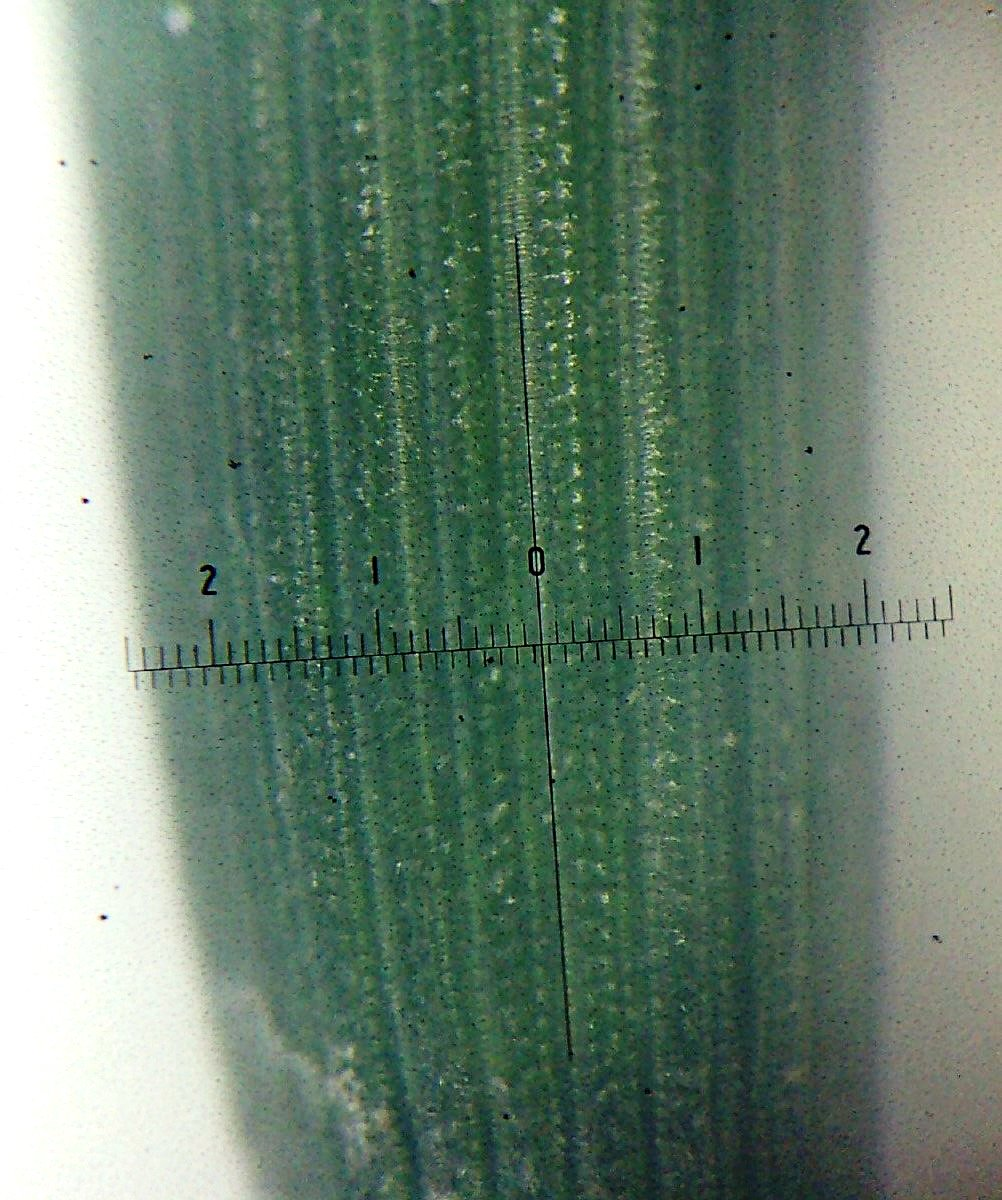
Microscopic view of E. hyemale (rough horsetail), about 4.5 mm in diameter. The small white dots are accumulated silicates on cells.

=== Spores ===
The spores are borne under sporangiophores in strobili, cone-like structures at the tips of some of the stems. In many species the cone-bearing shoots are unbranched, and in some (e.g. E. arvense, field horsetail) they are non-photosynthetic, produced early in spring. In some other species (e.g. E. palustre, marsh horsetail) they are very similar to sterile shoots, photosynthetic and with whorls of branches.

Horsetails are mostly homosporous, though in the field horsetail, smaller spores give rise to male prothalli. The spores have four elaters that act as moisture-sensitive springs, assisting spore dispersal through crawling and hopping motions after the sporangia have split open longitudinally. They are photosynthetic and have a lifespan that is usually two weeks at most, but will germinate immediately under humid conditions and develop into a gametophyte.

=== Cell walls ===
The crude cell extracts of all Equisetum species tested contain mixed-linkage glucan : xyloglucan endotransglucosylase (MXE) activity. This is a novel enzyme and is not known to occur in any other plants. In addition, the cell walls of all Equisetum species tested contain mixed-linkage glucan (MLG), a polysaccharide which, until recently, was thought to be confined to the Poales. The evolutionary distance between Equisetum and the Poales suggests that each evolved MLG independently. The presence of MXE activity in Equisetum suggests that they have evolved MLG along with some mechanism of cell wall modification. Non-Equisetum land plants tested lack detectable MXE activity. An observed negative correlation between XET activity and cell age led to the suggestion that XET is catalysing endotransglycosylation in controlled wall-loosening during cell expansion. The lack of MXE in the Poales suggests that there it must play some other, currently unknown, role. Due to the correlation between MXE activity and cell age, MXE has been proposed to promote the cessation of cell expansion.

== Taxonomy ==
=== Species ===
Currently, 18 species of Equisetum are accepted by Plants of the World Online. Some researchers speak of 25 species. The living members are divided into three distinct lineages, which are usually treated as subgenera. The name of the type subgenus, Equisetum, means "horse hair" in Latin, while the name of the other large subgenus, Hippochaete, means "horse hair" in Greek. Hybrids are common, but hybridization has only been recorded between members of the same subgenus.

Two Equisetum plants are sold under the names Equisetum japonicum (barred horsetail) and Equisetum camtschatcense (Kamchatka horsetail). These are both types of E. hyemale var. hyemale, although they may also be listed as separate varieties of E. hyemale.

The Smith et al. classification of 2006, based on molecular phylogeny, placed Equisetum in Equisetaceae. Subsequent classifications have maintained this placement.

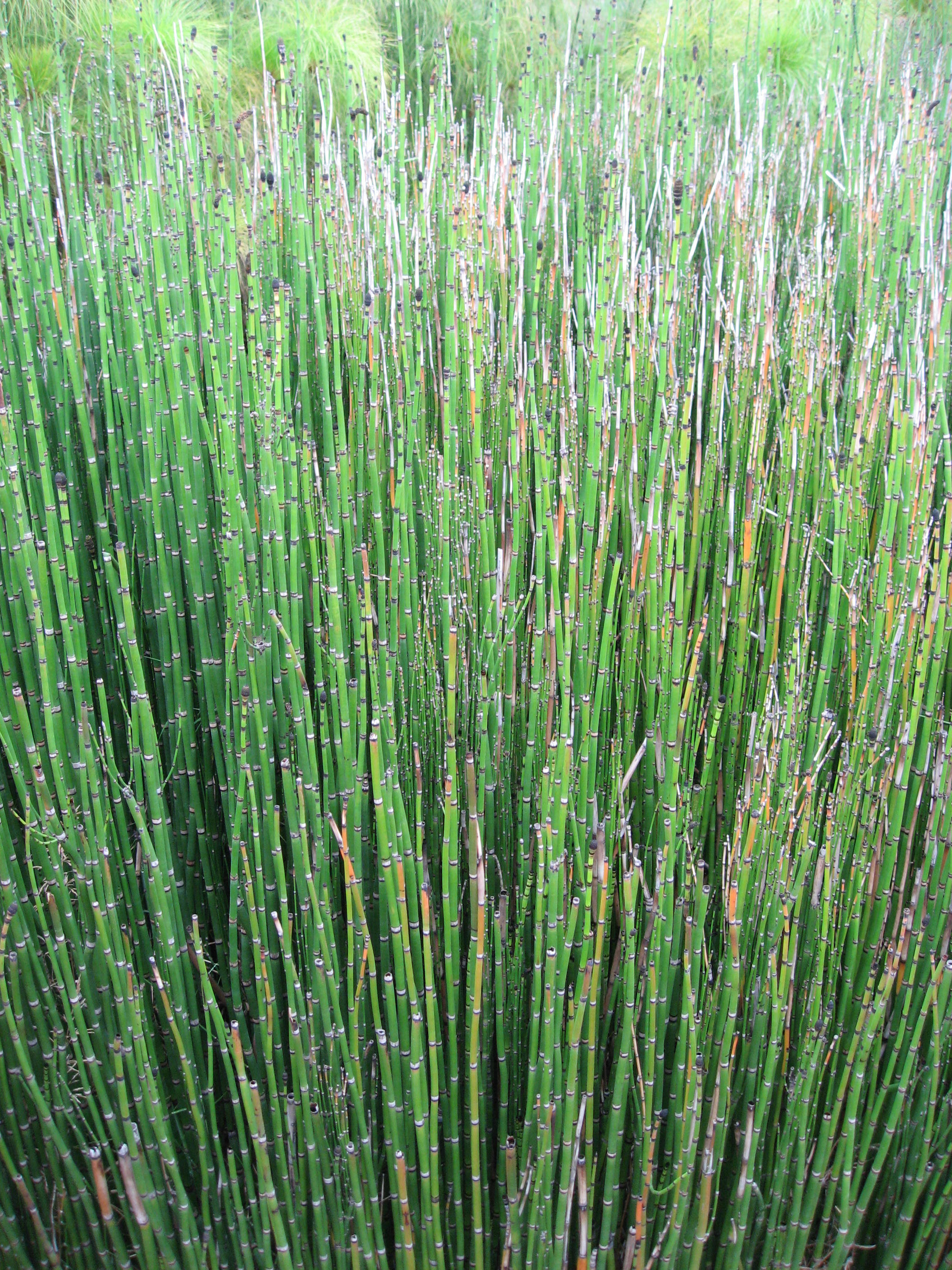
Equisetum hyemale (rough horsetail) in Parc floral de Paris

=== Evolutionary history ===
Equisetum is a "living fossil", the only living genus of the entire subclass Equisetidae, which for over 100 million years was much more diverse and dominated the understorey of late Paleozoic forests. Some equisetids were large trees reaching to 30 m (98 ft) tall. The genus Calamites of the family Calamitaceae, for example, is abundant in coal deposits from the Carboniferous period.

The oldest remains of modern Equisetum horsetails first appear in the Early Jurassic, represented by E. dimorphum from the Early Jurassic of Patagonia and Equisetum laterale from the Early-Middle Jurassic of Australia. Silicified remains of Equisetum thermale from the Late Jurassic of Argentina exhibit all the morphological characters of modern members of the genus. The estimated split between Equisetum bogotense and all other living Equisetum is estimated to have occurred no later than the Early Jurassic.

==== Subgenus Paramochaete ====
- Equisetum bogotense Kunth – Andean horsetail; upland South America up to Costa Rica; includes E. rinihuense, sometimes treated as a separate species. Previously included in subg. Equisetum, but Christenhusz et al. (2019) transfer this here, as E. bogotense appears to be sister to all the remaining species in the genus.

==== Subgenus Equisetum ====
- Equisetum arvense L. – field horsetail or common horsetail; circumboreal down through temperate zones
- Equisetum braunii Milde – northern giant horsetail, syn. E. telmateia subsp. braunii (Milde) Hauke.; west coast of North America
- Equisetum diffusum D.Don – Himalayan horsetail; Himalayan India and China and adjacent nations above about 450 metres (1,480 ft)
- Equisetum fluviatile L. – water horsetail; circumboreal down through temperate zones
- Equisetum palustre L. – marsh horsetail; circumboreal down through temperate zones
- Equisetum pratense Ehrh. – shady horsetail, meadow horsetail, shade horsetail; circumboreal except for tundra down through cool temperate zones
- Equisetum sylvaticum L. – wood horsetail; circumboreal down through cool temperate zones, more restricted in east Asia
- Equisetum telmateia Ehrh. – great horsetail; Europe to Asia Minor and north Africa. The former North American subspecies Equisetum telmateia subsp. braunii (Milde) Hauke is now treated as a separate species Equisetum braunii Milde

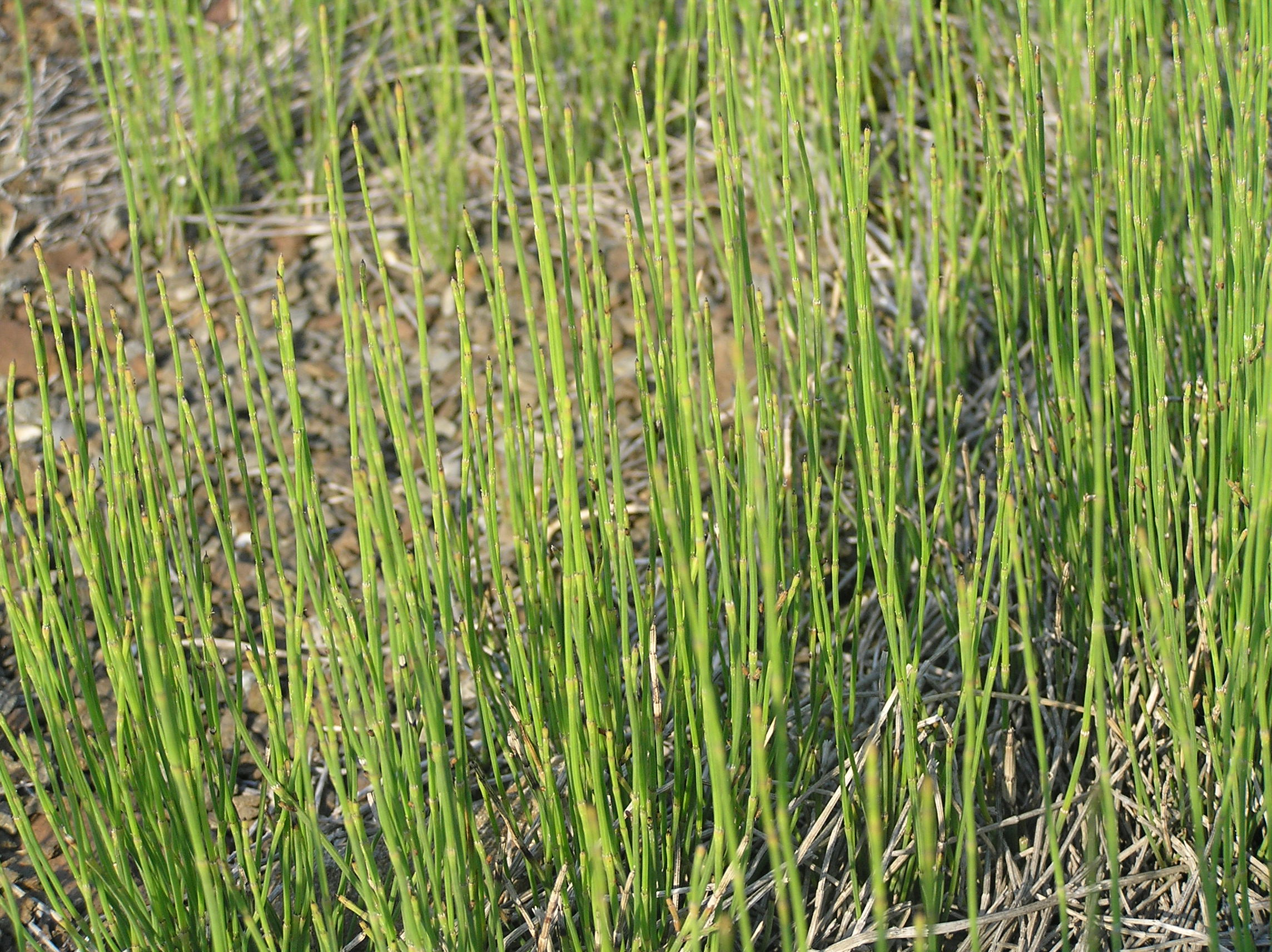
Equisetum ramosissimum in the Czech Republic

==== Subgenus Hippochaete ====
- Equisetum giganteum L. – southern giant horsetail or giant horsetail; temperate to tropical South America and Central America north to southern Mexico
- Equisetum hyemale L. – rough horsetail; most of non-tropical Old World. The former North American subspecies Equisetum hyemale subsp. affine (Engelm.) A.A.Eat. is now treated as a separate species Equisetum praealtum Raf.
- Equisetum laevigatum A.Braun – smooth horsetail, smooth scouringrush; western 3/4 of North America down into northwestern Mexico; also sometimes known as Equisetum kansanum
- Equisetum myriochaetum Schltdl. & Cham. – Mexican giant horsetail; from central Mexico south to Peru
- Equisetum praealtum Raf. – scouringrush horsetail, syn. E. hyemale subsp. affine (Engelm.) A.A.Eat.; temperate North America
- Equisetum ramosissimum Desf. (including E. debile) – branched horsetail; Asia, Europe, Africa, southwest Pacific islands
- Equisetum scirpoides Michx. – dwarf horsetail, dwarf scouringrush; northern (cool temperate) zones worldwide
- Equisetum variegatum Schleich. ex Weber & Mohr – variegated horsetail, variegated scouringrush; northern (cool temperate) zones worldwide, except for northeasternmost Asia
- Equisetum xylochaetum Mett. – Atacama Desert giant horsetail; southern Peru, northern Chile

==== Unplaced to subgenus ====
- †Equisetum dimorphum – Early Jurassic, Argentina
- †Equisetum laterale – Early to Middle Jurassic, Australia
- †Equisetum thermale – Middle to Late Jurassic, Argentina
- †Equisetum similkamense – Ypresian, British Columbia

=== Named hybrids ===
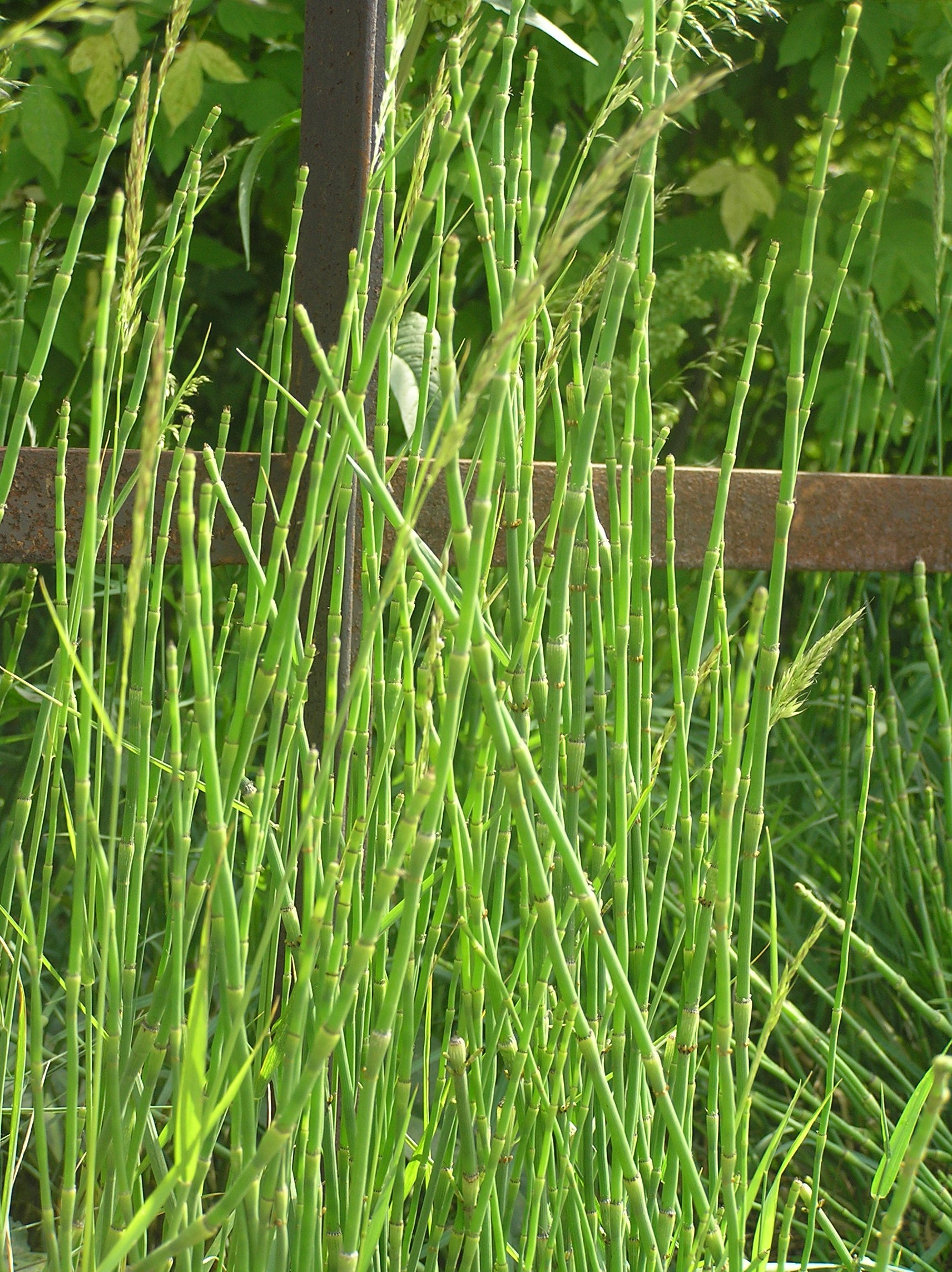
Equisetum × moorei (E. hyemale × E. ramosissiumum)

==== Hybrids between species in subgenus Equisetum ====
- Equisetum × bowmanii C.N.Page (Equisetum sylvaticum × Equisetum telmateia)
- Equisetum × dycei C.N.Page (Equisetum fluviatile × Equisetum palustre)
- Equisetum × font-queri Rothm. (Equisetum palustre × Equisetum telmateia)
- Equisetum × litorale Kühlew ex Rupr. (Equisetum arvense × Equisetum fluviatile)
- Equisetum × mchaffieae C.N.Page (Equisetum fluviatile × Equisetum pratense)
- Equisetum × mildeanum Rothm. (Equisetum pratense × Equisetum sylvaticum)
- Equisetum × robertsii Dines (Equisetum arvense × Equisetum telmateia)
- Equisetum × rothmaleri C.N.Page (Equisetum arvense × Equisetum palustre)
- Equisetum × willmotii C.N.Page (Equisetum fluviatile × Equisetum telmateia)

==== Hybrids between species in subgenus Hippochaete ====
- Equisetum × ferrissii Clute (Equisetum hyemale × Equisetum laevigatum)
- Equisetum × moorei Newman (Equisetum hyemale × Equisetum ramosissimum)
- Equisetum × nelsonii (A.A.Eaton) Schaffn. (Equisetum laevigatum × Equisetum variegatum)
- Equisetum × schaffneri Milde (Equisetum giganteum × Equisetum myriochaetum)
- Equisetum × trachyodon (A.Braun) W.D.J.Koch (Equisetum hyemale × Equisetum variegatum)

=== Phylogeny ===
Christenhusz et al. 2019

- Equisetum
  - - (Paramochaete)
      E. bogotense
  - - (Equisetum)
      - - E. palustre
        - E. pratense
      - - - E. telmateia
          - E. braunii
        - - E. sylvaticum
          - - - E. diffusum
              - E. fluviatile
            - E. arvense
    - (Hippochaete)
      - E. scirpoides
      - - E. variegatum
        - - - E. ramosissimum
            - - E. hyemale
              - E. praealtum
          - - - E. laevigatum
              - E. myriochaetum
            - E. giganteum

Nitta et al. 2022 and Fern Tree of life

- Equisetum
  - - (Paramochaete)
      E. bogotense
  - - (Equisetum)
      - - E. × fontqueri
        - E. telmateia
      - - E. pratense
        - - E. palustre
          - - - E. × dycei
              - E. fluviatile
            - - E. arvense
              - - E. × litorale
                - E. sylvaticum
    - (Hippochaete)
      - - E. giganteum
        - E. × schaffneri
      - - - E. myriochaetum
          - - E. × ferrissii
            - E. laevigatum
        - - - E. scirpoides
            - E. ramosissimum
          - - E. variegatum
            - - E. hyemale
              - E. × trachyodon

=== Etymology ===
The scientific name Equisetum is derived from the Latin equus ('horse') + seta ('bristle').

== Distribution and habitat ==
The genus Equisetum as a whole, while concentrated in the non-tropical Northern Hemisphere, is near-cosmopolitan, being absent naturally only from Antarctica, Australia, New Zealand, and the islands of the Pacific Ocean. They are most common in northern Europe, with ten species (E. arvense, E. fluviatile, E. hyemale, E. palustre, E. pratense, E. ramosissimum, E. scirpoides, E. sylvaticum, E. telmateia, and E. variegatum); Great Britain has nine of these species, missing only E. scirpoides of the European list. Northern North America (Canada and the northernmost United States), also has nine species (E. arvense, E. fluviatile, E. laevigatum, E. palustre, E. praealtum, E. pratense, E. scirpoides, E. sylvaticum, and E. variegatum). Only five (E. bogotense, E. giganteum, E. myriochaetum, E. ramosissimum, and E. xylochaetum) of the 18 species are known to be native south of the equator.

The plants grow in habitats including marshy areas.

== Ecology ==
Equisetum species may have been a common food for herbivorous dinosaurs. With studies showing that horsetails are nutritionally of high quality, it is assumed that horsetails were an important component of herbivorous dinosaur diets. Analysis of the scratch marks on hadrosaur teeth is consistent with grazing on hard plants like horsetails.

=== As an invasive species ===
One species, E. fluviatile, is an emergent aquatic, rooted in water with shoots growing into the air. The stalks arise from rhizomes that are deep underground and difficult to dig out. Field horsetail (E. arvense) can be a nuisance weed, readily regrowing from the rhizome after being pulled out. It is unaffected by many herbicides designed to kill seed plants. Since the stems have a waxy coat, the plant is resistant to contact weedkillers like glyphosate. However, as E. arvense prefers an acidic soil, lime may be used to assist in eradication efforts to bring the soil pH to 7 or 8. Members of the genus have been declared noxious weeds in Australia.

All the Equisetum are classed as "unwanted organisms" in New Zealand and are listed on the National Pest Plant Accord.

== Toxicity ==
E. arvense contains thiaminase, which metabolizes the B vitamin, thiamine, potentially causing thiamine deficiency and associated liver damage, if taken chronically. Horsetail might produce a diuretic effect. Further, its safety for oral consumption has not been sufficiently evaluated and it may be toxic, especially to children and pregnant women.

If eaten over a long enough period of time, some species of horsetail can be poisonous to grazing animals, including horses. The toxicity appears to be due to thiaminase.

== Uses ==
People have regularly consumed horsetails. The fertile stems bearing strobili of some species can be cooked and eaten like asparagus (a dish called tsukushi (土筆) in Japan). Indigenous nations across Cascadia consume and use horsetails in a variety of ways, with the Squamish calling them sx̱ém'x̱em and the Lushootseed using gʷəɫik, or horsetail roots, for cedar root baskets.

Extracts and other preparations of E. arvense have served as herbal remedies, with records dating over centuries. In 2009, the European Food Safety Authority concluded that there was no evidence for the supposed health effects of E. arvense, such as for invigoration, weight control, skincare, hair health or bone health. As of 2018, there is insufficient scientific evidence for its effectiveness as a medicine to treat any human condition.

== In culture ==
The pattern of spacing of nodes in horsetails, wherein those toward the apex of the shoot are increasingly close together, is said to have inspired John Napier to invent logarithms.

=== Common names ===
The name "horsetail", often used for the entire group, arose because the branched species somewhat resemble a horse's tail.

Other names include candock for branching species, puzzlegrass, and snake grass or scouring-rush for unbranched or sparsely branched species. The latter name refers to the rush-like appearance of the plants and to the fact that the stems are coated with abrasive silicates, making them useful for scouring (cleaning) metal items such as cooking pots or drinking mugs, particularly those made of tin. Equisetum hyemale, rough horsetail, is still boiled and then dried in Japan to be used for the final polishing process on woodcraft to produce a smooth finish. In German, the corresponding name is Zinnkraut ('tin-herb') or Schachtelhalm ('nesting stalk'). In Spanish-speaking countries, these plants are known as cola de caballo ('horsetail').

A superficially similar but entirely unrelated flowering plant genus, mare's tail (Hippuris), is occasionally referred to as "horsetail", and adding to confusion, the name "mare's tail" is sometimes applied to Equisetum.

== See also ==
- List of plants poisonous to equines
