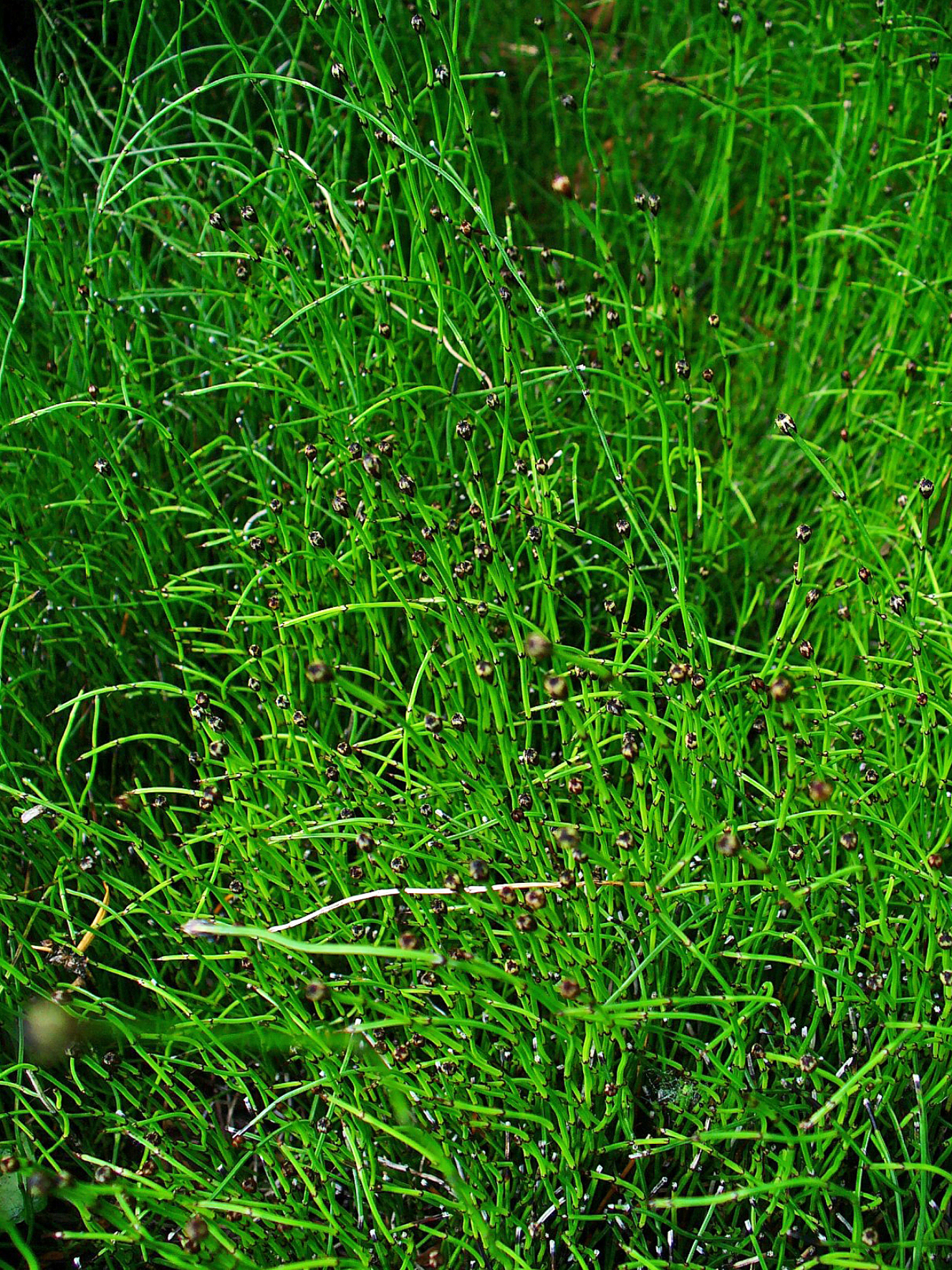

Scientific classification
- Kingdom: Plantae
- Clade: Tracheophytes
- Division: Polypodiophyta
- Class: Polypodiopsida
- Subclass: Equisetidae
- Order: Equisetales
- Family: Equisetaceae
- Genus: Equisetum
- Subgenus: E. subg. Hippochaete
- Species: E. scirpoides

Binomial name
- Equisetum scirpoides Michx.

Synonyms
- Hippochaete scirpoides (Michx.), Farw. 1916; Hippochaete scirpoides (Michx.), Rothm.; E. hiemale tenellum Liljeb. 1798; E. reptans Wahlenb. 1812; E. setaceum Vauch. 1821; E. scirpoides minus Lawson, Milde 1863; E. tenellum A. A. Eat. 1904; E. scirpoides elatum Rosend. 1917; E. scirpoides ramulosum Rosend. 1917; E. scirpoides caespitosum Rosend. 1917; E. scirpoides alpestre Rosend. 1917; E. scirpoides pedunculatum Rosend. 1917; E. scirpoides walkowiaki Walkowiak R.J. 2008

= Equisetum scirpoides =

Species of plant in the horsetail family

Equisetum scirpoides (dwarf scouring rush or dwarf horsetail) Michx., Fl. Bor.-Amer. 2: 281 (1803). 2 n = 216. The smallest of the currently occurring representatives of the genus Equisetum (horsetail).

The smallest Equisetum, E. scirpoides has circumpolar distribution. Plants create compact and dense clumps, reaching a maximum height of about 30 cm (12 in). The assimilation and generative shoots are identical and grow together. The leaves reduced to a black sheath around the stem. The stems are green, unbranched, thick and about 1 mm with six ribs. The generative shoots with small cones dying after sowing the spores. The nodes occur at approximately 1–3 cm (0.4–1.2 in). The leaves are very small to about 1 mm, and arranged in around nodes. The corms are thin, yellow and brown. The roots very fine, black and densely surpassing the ground. Species grows best in the mud at the depth zone from 0 to 3 cm. Specimens reproduce primarily by vegetative division. Equisetum scirpoides is hardy and semi-evergreen. This species is quite a popular decorative plant seen in garden ponds, ornamental gardens and assumptions in nearly the whole world. E. scirpoides was discovered and described by French botanist André Michaux. Detailed studies were conducted by the American botanist Oliver Atkins Farwell.

== Name ==
Equisetum, from the Latin equus, "horse", and seta, "bristle, animal hair". Scirpoides, from the Latin scirpus, "rush, bulrush". Scouring Rush, a reference to its early use for cleaning pots, made possible by its high silica content. Other common names include dwarf horsetail, sedge horsetail, prele faux-scirpe (Qué), tradfräken (Swe), dvergsnelle (Nor), trad-padderok (Dan), hentokorte (Fin), dwergholpijp (NL), himedokusa (Jpn), skrzyp arktyczny (PL).

== Distribution ==
Austria, Finland, Norway, Spitsbergen, Sweden, Greenland, St. Pierre and MiqueIon, Canada (Alberta, British Columbia, Manitoba, New Brunswick, Newfoundland, N.W.Territories, Nunavut, Nova Scotia, Ontario, Prince Edward Isl., Quebec, Saskatchewan, Yukon), Alaska, US (Idaho, Illinois, Iowa, Maine, Massachusetts, Michigan, Minnesota, Montana, New Hampshire, New York, South Dakota, Vermont, Washington, Wisconsin), W-Siberia, C-Siberia, E-Siberia, Amur, Ussuri, Japan, Novaja Zemlja, Kamchatka, N-European Russia, Lithuania, Estonia, C-European Russia, E-European Russia.

== Subspecies ==
Within Equisetum scirpoides there are two subspecies:

- Equisetum scirpoides ssp. scirpoides (A. Michaux, Fl. Bor.-Amer. 2: 281. 1803)

Hippochaete scirpoides (Michaux, Farwell) – Main subspecies, grows up to about 30 cm. Low, slender, wiry, unbranched stems. Stems erect or prostrate, hollow, segmented, rough surfaced, green. Internodes about 4 apart with segments marked by ashy grey bands. Sterile and fertile stems alike. Twisting and wiry in form, branching rare. Sheaths tiny, 1 – 2.5 mm × 0.75 – 1.5 mm, with three teeth, dark with white margins. Cones usually 1 long with sharp pointed tips, borne on short stalks at the tips of fertile stems. Spores green, spheric. Rootstalk shiny black, creeping, freely branching, and wide spreading. Roots black to very dark brown.

- Equisetum scirpoides ssp. walkowiaki (R. J. Walkowiak, IEA Paper 2008)

Equisetum scirpoides (ssp.) minus (Lawson, Milde) – Smaller subspecies, grows up to about 15 cm. The botanical characteristics identical with the main subspecies. Often seen primarily as an ornamental plant in Japan. Subspecies described by Scottish botanist George Lawson and eminent German botanist Carl August Julius Milde, but without a proper taxonomic name, which gave the Polish botanist Radosław Janusz Walkowiak (subsp. walkowiaki).

== Identification ==
Identifiable as a horsetail by the upright, hollow, jointed, cylindrical stems with inconsequential and easily overlooked leaves. Distinguished from other horsetails by its low, slender, wiry, unbranched stems and its small size. This is the smallest living horsetail. Field marks, diminutive size, low, slender, wiry, unbranched stems.

== See also ==
- Fern
- Equisetum
