= Vegetative shoot =

Shoot lacking reproductive organs

A vegetative shoot is a shoot which lacks reproductive organs, spores, and seeds. Many plant species produce only reproductive shoots; some have both vegetative and reproductive shoots simultaneously. In other species, sterile shoots are produced at a different time than the reproductive shoots. Sterile shoots serve an assimilative function, producing organic substances through photosynthesis necessary for the plant's development and growth.

== Vascular plants ==
=== Horsetails ===
In the case of horsetails, vegetative shoots exist in form of sterile shoots, which are shoots on which spore-bearing strobili are not produced. In temperate zones, it is usually produced later than the spore-bearing shoot. The sterile shoot is the asexual phase – the sporophyte. Its function is to carry out photosynthesis and produce reserve substances, which, stored in the rhizome and the shoot tubers located on it, enable the development of the spore-bearing shoot and the production of spores. Additionally, due to their function, the sterile shoot is often much larger than the spore-producing shoot, a notable case of this can be observed in Equisetum telmateia, also called the great horsetail, where the sterile shoot is said to reach heights of 1.5 to 2 meters, while the spore-producing shoot's stems only reach 25–30 cm in height.^{14-15.}

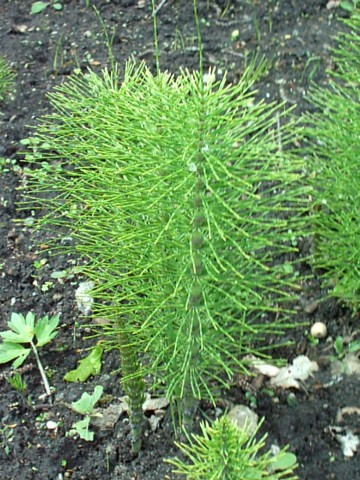
Vegetative (sterile) shoots of Equisetum telmateia

The sterile shoot of horsetails arises from an underground rhizome and is composed of alternating long segments (internodes) and short segments (nodes). From the nodes on the above-ground shoots, numerous lateral shoots (also segmented) and small, scale-like leaves arise in whorls. Horsetail leaves are very small and do not participate in photosynthesis and are often blackish. They grow in whorls on the shoot, growing together around the nodes to form sheaths that support the bases of the internodes. Horsetail shoots are highly saturated with silica for structural support and break off easily at the nodes.

=== Ferns ===
In the morphology of ferns, the term usually refers to rhizomes and leaves, most often trophophylls, with their stipes connecting them to the rhizome. It is considered the primary form of a vegetative shoot, with some genera producing runners alongside them, which are capable of rooting and transforming into rhizomes, like in the case of Nephrolepis species or producing variations of leaves that may not serve a strictly assimilative purpose, such as in certain Platycerium species.

=== Seed plants ===
In seed plants, the term sterile shoots refers to shoots that do not produce flowers. Their opposite is the flowering shoot, which produces flowers. Some species of these plants have only flowering shoots, while others have sterile shoots alongside flowering shoots.

Examples of such shoots include (but are not limited to) rhizomes and stolons, which are underground and above-ground variants of a typical vegetative shoot respectively, and modified shoots which store energy and nutrients for the rest of the plant, such as bulbs and tubers.

== Uses in vegetative propagation ==
For the natural and artificial techniques involved in the asexual propagation of plants, see Vegetative propagation.

=== Commercial use ===
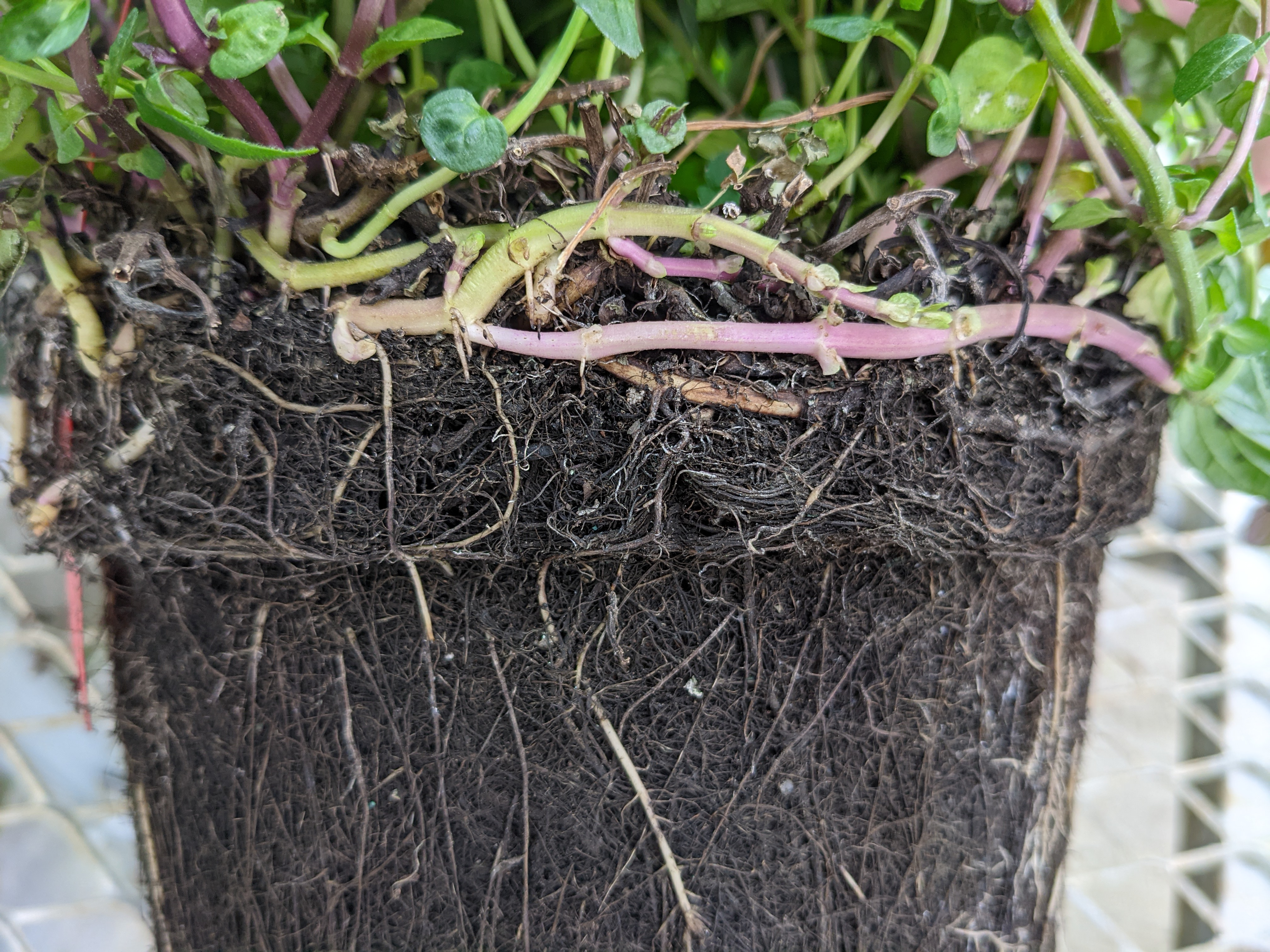
Roots and prominent rhizomes of Mentha × piperita, also called Peppermint.

Vegetative propagation using those structures has found commercial use in several species, such as potatoes, garlic, ginger and Mentha species, in situations when replication of the same characteristics with little variability in offspring is preferable to sexual reproduction using seeds, despite the required intensive labor that comes with the preparation of cuttings for growth.^{129-130}

== See also ==
- Assimilation (biology)
- Plant propagation
- Genetic variability
