= Equisetum dimorphum =

Equisetum dimorphum Temporal range: Pliensbachian

Scientific classification
- Kingdom: Plantae
- Clade: Tracheophytes
- Division: Polypodiophyta
- Class: Polypodiopsida
- Subclass: Equisetidae
- Order: Equisetales
- Family: Equisetaceae
- Genus: Equisetum
- Species: †E. dimorphum

Binomial name
- †Equisetum dimorphum Elgorriaga

Extinct species of plant in the horsetail family

Equisetum dimorphum is an extinct horsetail species of the family Equisetaceae, and one of the oldest records of the genus Equisetum. It was found in rocks from the Lower Jurassic of Chubut, Argentina, among other plants as ferns, conifers and pteridosperms. Their remains consist of stems, leaves, strobili, and pagoda structures, which are preserved as impressions and casts. The combination of fine grained sediment, and the probable silica deposits in the epidermis of the plant, have managed to conserve not only its gross morphology, but also epidermal details not often present in this kind of preservation. This species was described in 2015 in Ameghiniana by a team led by Andres Elgorriaga, that included investigators of the Museum of Paleontology Egidio Feruglio, the Swedish Museum of Natural History, and the Buenos Aires University.

== Description ==
The stems are dimorphic, unbranched and present no sign of superficial ribs and valleys. They are hollow except at the nodal regions, where complex nodal diaphragms occur. The diaphragms are flat, with a pitted surface and a cart-wheel internal structure. Each node is covered by a leaf sheath, bearing up to 42 lanceolate leaves. The sheaths are fused nearly 75% of the leaf length, having a distinct commisural furrows dividing the individual leaves. The stem apices are usually topped with a pagoda-like structure formed by detached leaves from the nodes below. The strobili occur singly at the apex of reproductive stems, they are elliptic to oblong, with a rounded apex, and bear numerous whorls of hexagonal sporangiophores. The leaves present on the reproductive stems are far longer than normal ones. Stomata occur in broad bands, both superficially and sunken.

== Morphological curiosities ==
One of the most notable features of this species is the presence of pagoda-like structures at the tip of its stems. This kind of structures is also present in one living species, Equisetum hyemale, and is formed thanks to the unique type of growth that this group processes, with intercalary meristems at the base of each node.

Another feature of this species is the presence of twin stems, result of a dichotomy of the main stems. This kind of feature was also noted in E. hyemale.

== Subgeneric placement ==
This species possess characters from both present day subgenus. It shares with the Equisetum genus the rounded strobilar apex and the dimorphic habit. It shares with the Hippochaete subgenus its dimorphic habit, the absence of branches, and the presence of pagoda structures. This species also shares characters with both subgenus at the same time, such as the position of stomata and the absence and presence of leaf tips. As Equisetum thermale, another Jurassic fossil Equisetum from Argentina, E. dimorphum shows a combination of characters from both living subgenera, Equsietum and Hippochaete. There are two other Equisetum species, very similar to E. dimorphum, that also possess this mosaic of characters, and perhaps the three species belong to a previously unidentified fossil subgenus.
