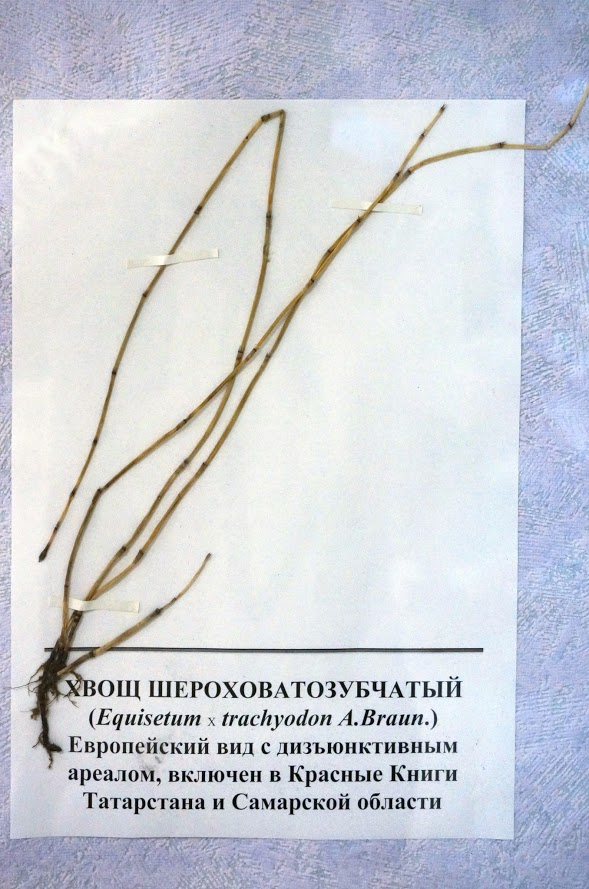

Scientific classification
- Kingdom: Plantae
- Clade: Tracheophytes
- Division: Polypodiophyta
- Class: Polypodiopsida
- Subclass: Equisetidae
- Order: Equisetales
- Family: Equisetaceae
- Genus: Equisetum
- Species: E. × trachyodon

Binomial name
- Equisetum × trachyodon A.Braun

= Equisetum × trachyodon =

Species of vascular plant

Equisetum × trachyodon is a nothospecies of Equisetum found in northwestern and central Europe. Sometimes, it is considered as an individual species: Equisetum trachyodon.

The hybrid formula is Equisetum hyemale L. × Equisetum variegatum Schleich. ex F.Weber & D.Mohr.

== Synonyms ==
- Equisetum hiemale var. doellii Milde
- Equisetum hiemale var. trachyodon A.Braun ex Döll
- Equisetum hyemale var. jesupii (A.A.Eat.) Victorin
- Equisetum hyemale var. mackayi Newman
- Equisetum hyemale f. multirameum (S.F.Blake) Vict.
- Equisetum hyemale var. trachyodon (A.K.H.Braun) Döll
- Equisetum hyemale subsp. trachyodon A.Br.
- Equisetum mackaii (Newman) Brichan
- Equisetum mackayi (Newman) Brichan
- Equisetum trachyodon f. fuchsii Geissert
- Equisetum trachyodon f. geminatum (S.F.Blake) M.Broun
- Equisetum trachyodon f. multirameum (S.F.Blake) M.Broun
- Equisetum variegatum var. anglicum Milde
- Equisetum variegatum var. concolor Milde
- Equisetum variegatum var. continentale Milde
- Equisetum variegatum f. geminatum S.F.Blake
- Equisetum variegatum var. jesupii A.A.Eat. ex Gilbert
- Equisetum variegatum f. multirameum S.F.Blake
- Equisetum variegatum var. trachyodon (A.K.H.Braun) J.D.Hooker fil.
- Hippochaete fuchsii (Geissert) H.P.Fuchs & Geissert
- Hippochaete hyemalis var. jesupii (A.A.Eat.) Farw.
- Hippochaete trachyodon (A.Br.) Boern.
- Hippochaete variegata var. jesupii (A.A.Eat.) Farw.
