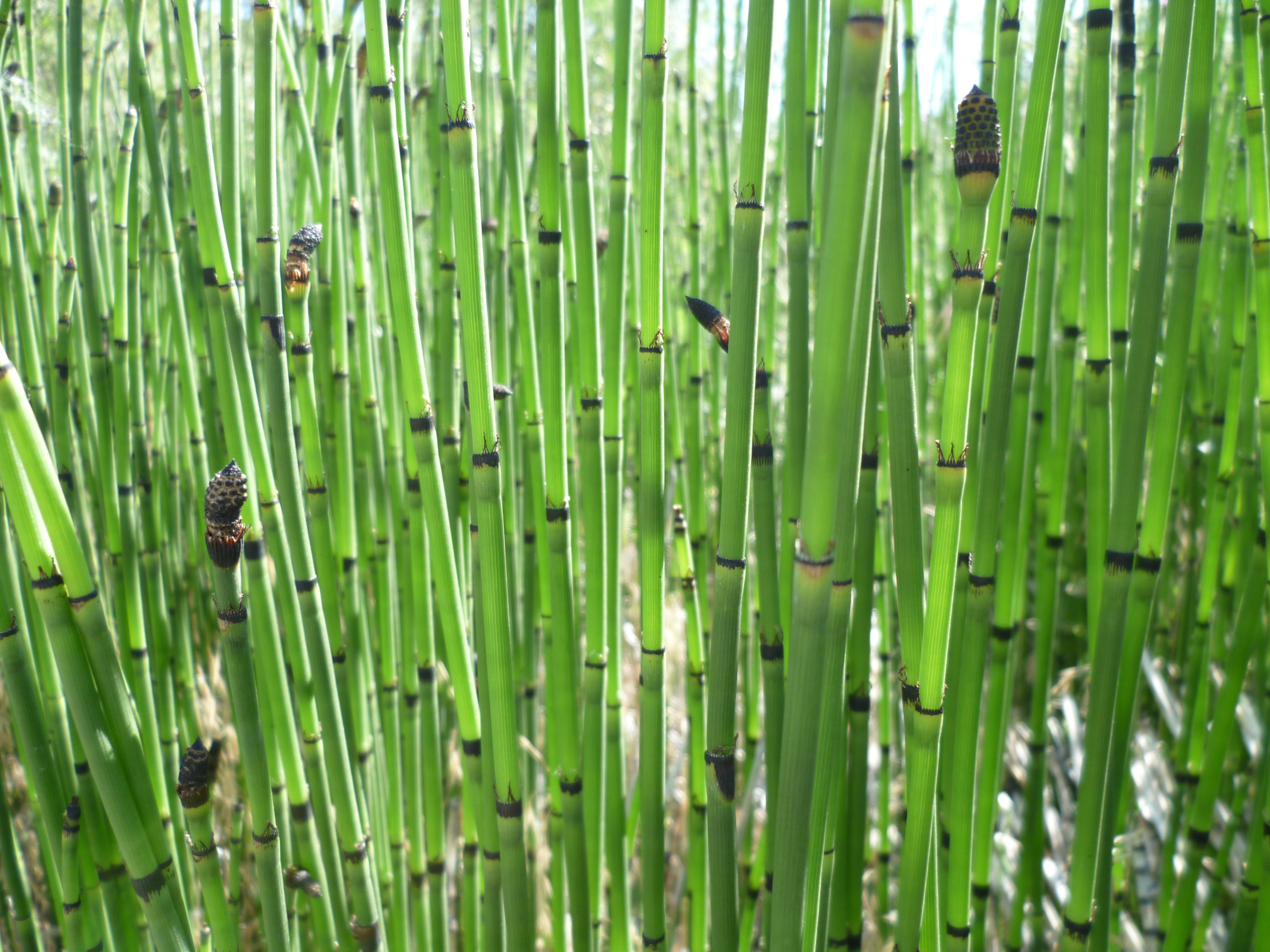
- Equisetum praealtum by the Columbia River at Spanish Castle, Douglas County, Washington

Scientific classification
- Kingdom: Plantae
- Clade: Tracheophytes
- Division: Polypodiophyta
- Class: Polypodiopsida
- Subclass: Equisetidae
- Order: Equisetales
- Family: Equisetaceae
- Genus: Equisetum
- Subgenus: E. subg. Hippochaete
- Species: E. praealtum

Binomial name
- Equisetum praealtum Raf.

Synonyms
- Equisetum hyemale var. affine (Engelm.) A.A.Eaton; Equisetum hyemale subsp. affine (Engelm.) Calder & Roy L.Taylor

= Equisetum praealtum =

Species of plant in the horsetail family

Equisetum praealtum, the scouringrush horsetail, is a species of Equisetum (horsetail) native to North America and northeastern Asia. It was formerly widely treated as a subspecies or variety of the European and west Asian species Equisetum hyemale (rough horsetail), and still is by some authorities.

== Description ==
It is an evergreen herbaceous perennial plant, with green stems, each stem usually topped by a spore-bearing strobilus. The stems, produced in late spring and dying down a year and a half or two years later, are 18–150 cm (7.1–59.1 in) (occasionally to 220 cm (87 in)) tall and 6–18 mm (0.24–0.71 in) diameter, usually unbranched; they are ridged, with 14–50 ridges, and bear whorls of blackish bracts. The young stems are produced in spring and develop an apical spore-bearing strobilus in summer; sometimes, in the second year, the stem will produce a few side branches tipped with further strobili. It also spreads by means of rhizomes, which form clonal colonies.

== Habitat ==
It is found in wet places, including roadside ditches, along rivers, lake shores, and in wet woods.
