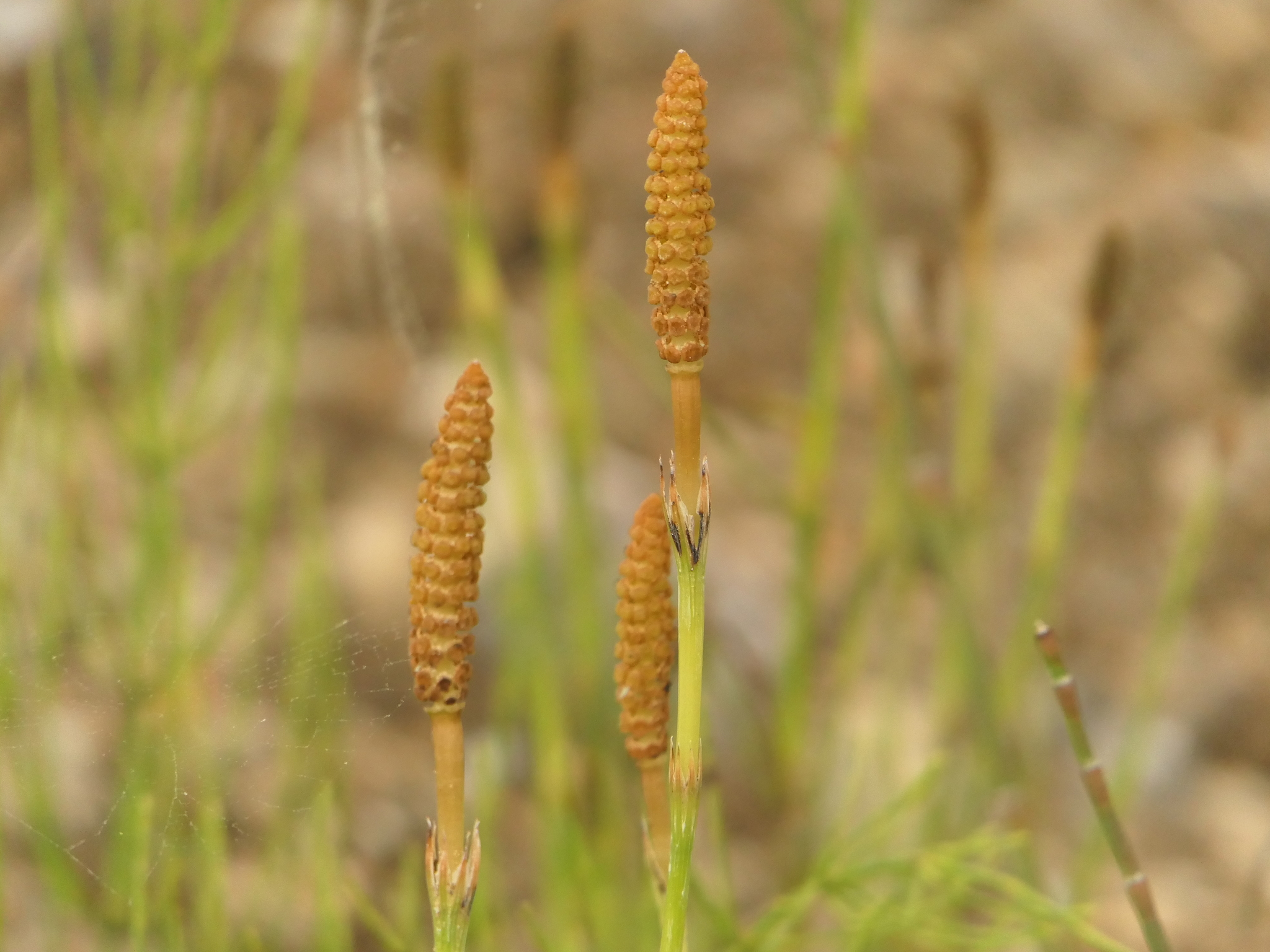
- Himalayan horsetail growing in Nepal

Scientific classification
- Kingdom: Plantae
- Clade: Tracheophytes
- Division: Polypodiophyta
- Class: Polypodiopsida
- Subclass: Equisetidae
- Order: Equisetales
- Family: Equisetaceae
- Genus: Equisetum
- Subgenus: E. subg. Equisetum
- Species: E. diffusum

Binomial name
- Equisetum diffusum D.Don

= Equisetum diffusum =

Himalayan horsetail

Species of plant in the horsetail family

The Himalayan horsetail (Equisetum diffusum) is a perennial that averages at 10–25 inches. The Himalayas plant is silica rich and has a rhizomatous stem. This shiny brown stem can have many small hair-like roots and may also grow tubers.
