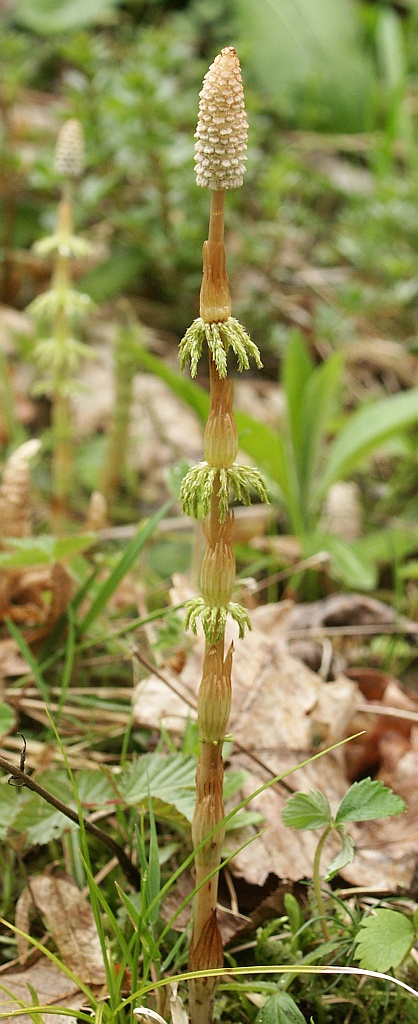

Scientific classification
- Kingdom: Plantae
- Clade: Tracheophytes
- Division: Polypodiophyta
- Class: Polypodiopsida
- Subclass: Equisetidae
- Order: Equisetales
- Family: Equisetaceae
- Genus: Equisetum
- Subgenus: E. subg. Equisetum
- Species: E. sylvaticum

Binomial name
- Equisetum sylvaticum L.

= Equisetum sylvaticum =

Wood horsetail

Species of plant in the horsetail family

Equisetum sylvaticum, the wood horsetail, is a horsetail (family Equisetaceae) native to the Northern Hemisphere, occurring in North America and Eurasia. Because of its lacy appearance, it is considered among the most attractive of the horsetails.

== Description ==
This perennial pteridophyte has erect, hollow stems that grow from 30 to 50 cm (12 to 20 in) in length and from 1–4 mm thick.

The branches themselves are compound and delicate, occurring in whorls and drooping downward. There are generally 12 or more branches per whorl. Fertile stems are at first tan-to-brown and unbranched, but later become like the sterile stems, which are more highly branched and green. All the stems have 10–18 spiny vertical ridges that contain silica spicules. The leaves are scales fused into sheaths that cover the stems and branches. These spiny leaves are larger and looser on the fertile stems. The plant is well identifiable from the 3–6 reddish brown leaf sheaths or "teeth".

The fertile stems are shorter than the others; on these develop the cones that bear the spore casings or strobili. The leaves develop on the fertile stems and the stems lengthen; then the cones open to release their spores. The cones then drop off. This process takes a few weeks. All the stems may continue to grow until fall and generally die back over winter.

== Taxonomy ==
Linnaeus was the first to describe wood horsetail with the binomial Equisetum sylvaticum in his Species Plantarum of 1753.

=== Reproduction ===
This plant reproduces by spores, but its primary means of reproduction is done vegetatively by rhizomes. These rhizome systems are deep and extensive, as well as extremely long-lived. These creeping rhizomes occasionally produce tubers, and often outweigh the above-ground growth by 100 to 1.

== Habitat ==
These horsetails are commonly found in wet or swampy forest, open woodlands, and meadow areas. The species name sylvaticum is Latin for "of the forests", emphasizing that the wood horsetail is most commonly found in forested habitats. The plant is an indicator of boreal and cool-temperate climates, and very moist to wet, nitrogen-poor soils. It benefits greatly from areas affected by human activity such as ditches, pastures, clean-felled areas, cleared meadows and even fields. In the more open growing habitats, the plant is not as 'lacy' as in shady swamp areas, but more bushy and short-branched

In Finland, a specific coniferous swamp type has been named after this plant as metsäkortekorpi (literal translation: wood horsetail coniferous swamp).
