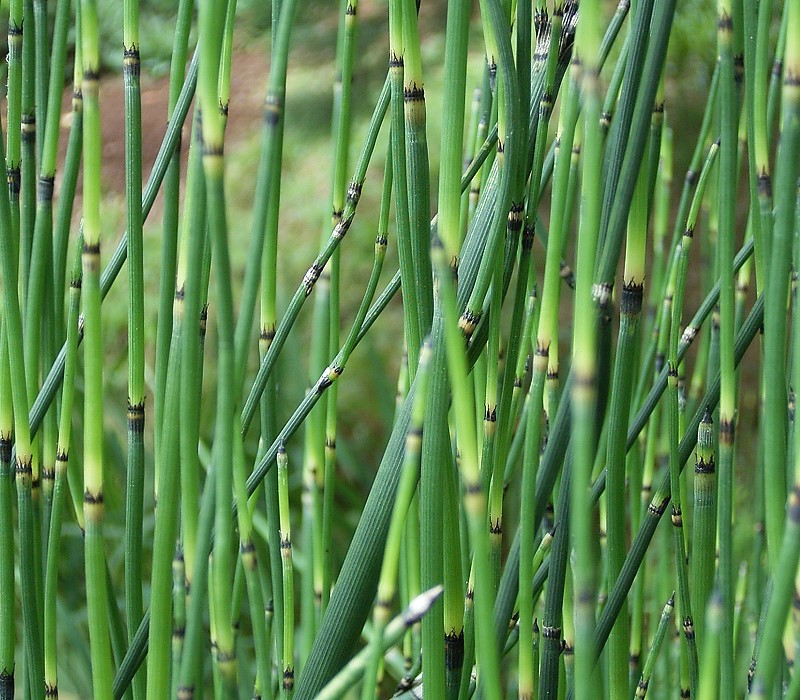

Conservation status
- Least Concern (IUCN 3.1)

Scientific classification
- Kingdom: Plantae
- Clade: Embryophytes
- Clade: Tracheophytes
- Division: Polypodiophyta
- Class: Polypodiopsida
- Subclass: Equisetidae
- Order: Equisetales
- Family: Equisetaceae
- Genus: Equisetum
- Subgenus: E. subg. Hippochaete
- Species: E. giganteum

Binomial name
- Equisetum giganteum L.

Synonyms
- List: Hippochaete gigantea (L.) Holub; Equisetum araucanum Phil.; Equisetum bolivianum Gand.; Equisetum brasiliense Milde; Equisetum brasiliense var. nudum (Milde ) Milde; Equisetum brasiliense f. nudum Milde; Equisetum brasiliense var. ramosum (Milde ) Milde; Equisetum brasiliense f. ramosum Milde; Equisetum caracasanum DC.; Equisetum elongatum var. affine Milde; Equisetum elongatum var. dolosum Milde; Equisetum elongatum var. scaberrimum Milde; Equisetum giganteum var. brasiliense (Milde ) Milde; Equisetum giganteum var. caracasanum (DC.) Milde; Equisetum giganteum var. chilense Milde; Equisetum giganteum var. digitaliferum Pastore; Equisetum humboldtianum Fendl.; Equisetum humboldtii Poir.; Equisetum martii Milde; Equisetum martii var. minus Milde; Equisetum philippii Gand.; Equisetum pyramidale Goldm.; Equisetum ramosissimum Humb. & Bonpl. ex Willd.; Equisetum ramosissimum var. affine (Milde ) Milde; Equisetum ramosissimum var. dolosum (Milde ) Milde; Equisetum ramosissimum var. scaberium Milde; Equisetum ramosissimum var. scandens (Gay) Milde; Equisetum scandens Gay; Equisetum tarapacanum Phil.

= Equisetum giganteum =

Species of plant in the horsetail family

Equisetum giganteum is a species of horsetail with the common name southern giant horsetail. It is native to South America and Central America, from central Chile east to Brazil and north to southern Mexico.

== Description ==
It is one of the largest horsetails, growing 2–5 metres (6.6–16.4 ft) tall, exceeded only by the closely allied Equisetum myriochaetum (up to 8 metres (26 ft) relying on surrounding plants' support. One form or variety has reached a height of 11 m (36 ft) in Venezuela, and a height of 12 m (39 ft) in the Pantanal region of Brazil. The stems are the stoutest of any horsetail, 1–2 cm (0.4–0.8 in) diameter, up to 3.5 cm (1.4 in) in diameter in some populations), and bear numerous whorls of very slender branches; as many as 56 scale-like leaves in a whorl although it is unclear whether all of these would produce branches. These branches are not further branched, but some terminate in spore cones. Unlike some other horsetails, it does not have separate photosynthetic sterile and non-photosynthetic spore-bearing stems.

Populations from northern Chile with very stout stems up to 3.5 cm (1.4 in) diameter have sometimes been treated as a separate species Equisetum xylochaetum, and gaining traction.
