= Karl Gustav Limpricht =

German schoolteacher and bryologist (1834–1902)

- Born: July 11, 1834; Eckersdorf near Sagan, Kingdom of Prussia
- Died: October 20, 1902 (aged 68); Breslau, German Empire
- Siglum: Limpr.
- Known for: Major work on mosses of Germany, Austria, and Switzerland; exsiccata Bryotheca Silesiaca
- Scientific career
- Fields: Botany, Bryology
- Institutions: Obergläsersdorf; Mädchen gymnasium
- Author abbrev. (botany): Limpr.

Karl Gustav Limpricht (11 July 1834, Eckersdorf near Sagan – 20 October 1902, Breslau) was a German schoolteacher and bryologist. His son, Hans Wolfgang Limpricht (born 1877), was a botanical collector in China.

From 1856 to 1858 he taught classes in the community of Obergläsersdorf (near Lüben), then spent several years as an instructor at the Mädchen gymnasium in Bunzlau (1858–1869). From 1869 onward, he was a teacher at the Evangelical high school in Breslau. In 1895 he attained the position of Oberlehrer.

He was the author of a major work on mosses native to Germany, Austria and Switzerland, titled Die Laubmoose Deutschlands, Oesterreichs und der Schweiz (3 volumes, 1885-1903). It was in included in Rabenhorst's Kryptogamenflora von Deutschland, Oesterreich und der Schweiz. His treatise on mosses and liverworts, Laub- und Lebermoose (1876), was published in Ferdinand Cohn's Kryptogamen-flora von Schlesien (Cryptogamic flora of Silesia). Limpricht issued the exsiccata Bryotheca Silesiaca and cooperated with Carl August Julius Milde. With Carl Gabriel Baenitz he edited the exsiccatal series Cyperaceen und Juncaceen Nord- und Mitteldeutschlands (1863-1865).

In 1907 Leopold Loeske named the moss genus Limprichtia (family Amblystegiaceae) after him.
