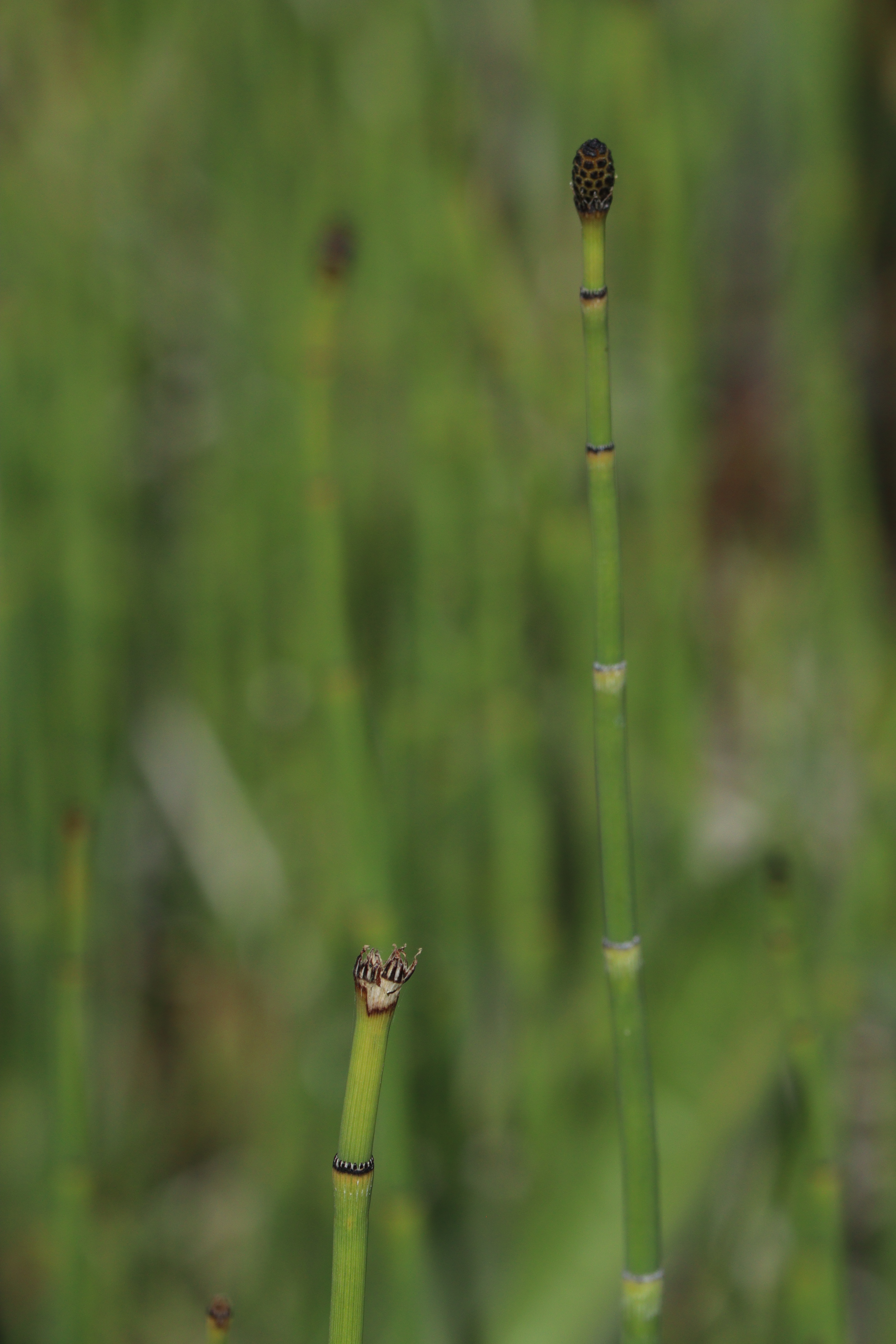

Conservation status
- Secure (NatureServe)

Scientific classification
- Kingdom: Plantae
- Clade: Tracheophytes
- Division: Polypodiophyta
- Class: Polypodiopsida
- Subclass: Equisetidae
- Order: Equisetales
- Family: Equisetaceae
- Genus: Equisetum
- Subgenus: E. subg. Hippochaete
- Species: E. laevigatum

Binomial name
- Equisetum laevigatum A.Braun

Synonyms
- List: *Equisetum fontinale Copel.; *Equisetum funstonii A.A.Eaton; *Equisetum funstonii var. caespitosum (A.A.Eaton) Jeps.; *Equisetum funstonii f. caespitosum A.A.Eaton; *Equisetum funstonii var. nudum (A.A.Eaton) Jeps.; *Equisetum funstonii f. nudum A.A.Eaton; *Equisetum funstonii f. polystachyum A.A.Eaton; *Equisetum funstonii var. ramosum (A.A.Eaton) Jeps.; *Equisetum funstonii f. ramosum A.A.Eaton; *Equisetum kansanum J.H.Schaffn.; *Equisetum kansanum f. caespiticum (Farw.) M.Broun; *Equisetum kansanum f. caespitosum (A.A.Eaton) M.Broun; *Equisetum kansanum f. eatonii (Farw.) M.Broun; *Equisetum kansanum f. polystachyum (A.A.Eaton) M.Broun; *Equisetum kansanum f. ramosum (A.A.Eaton) M.Broun; *Equisetum kansanum f. variegatoides (A.A.Eaton) M.Broun; *Equisetum laevigatum f. caespitosum A.A.Eaton; *Equisetum laevigatum subsp. funstonii (A.A.Eaton) Hartm.; *Equisetum laevigatum f. polystachum (A.A.Eaton) A.A.Eaton; *Equisetum laevigatum f. proliferum Haberer; *Equisetum laevigatum f. ramosum A.A.Eaton; *Equisetum laevigatum var. scabrellum A.Braun & Engelm.; *Equisetum laevigatum f. scabrellum (A.Braun & Engelm.) Milde; *Equisetum laevigatum f. variegatoides A.A.Eaton; *Equisetum praealtum var. laevigatum (A.Braun & Engelm.) Bush; *Hippochaete laevigata (A.Braun & Engelm.) Farw.; *Hippochaete laevigata var. caespitica Farw.; *Hippochaete laevigata var. caespitosa (A.A.Eaton) Farw.; *Hippochaete laevigata var. funstonii (A.A.Eaton) Farw.; *Hippochaete laevigata var. polystachya (A.A.Eaton) Farw.; *Hippochaete laevigata var. ramosa (A.A.Eaton) Farw.; *Hippochaete laevigata var. variegatoides (A.A.Eaton) Farw.; *Hippochaete praealta var. scabrella (A.Braun & Engelm.) Farw.

= Equisetum laevigatum =

Species of horsetail plant

Equisetum laevigatum is a species of horsetail in the family Equisetaceae. It is known by the common names smooth horsetail and smooth scouring rush. This plant is native to much of North America except for northern Canada and southern Mexico. It is usually found in moist areas in sandy and gravelly substrates. It may be annual or perennial. It grows narrow green stems sometimes reaching heights exceeding 1.5 meters (4 ft 11 in). The leaves at the nodes are small, scale-like brownish sheaths and there are occasionally small, spindly branches. The stems are topped with rounded cone-shaped sporangia.
