= Equisetum thermale =

Equisetum thermale Temporal range: Callovian - Tithonian

Scientific classification
- Kingdom: Plantae
- Clade: Tracheophytes
- Division: Polypodiophyta
- Class: Polypodiopsida
- Subclass: Equisetidae
- Order: Equisetales
- Family: Equisetaceae
- Genus: Equisetum
- Species: †E. thermale

Binomial name
- †Equisetum thermale Channing, Zamuner, Edwards, & Guido

Extinct species of plant in the horsetail family

Equisetum thermale is an extinct horsetail species in the family Equisetaceae described from a group of whole plant fossils including rhizomes, stems, and leaves. The species is known from Middle to Late Jurassic sediments exposed in the province of Santa Cruz, Argentina. It is one of several extinct species placed in the living genus Equisetum.

== History and classification ==
Equisetum thermale is represented by a series of fossil specimens preserved in hot springs deposits preserved in the Callovian to Tithonian aged La Matilde Formation. The group is part of the Bahía Laura Group exposed in the northwestern region of the Deseado Massif. The formations is the result of Jurassic age fault generated valleys filled by lacustrian infilling and hydrothermal activity represented by epithermal deposits. One such hot spring deposit, the San Agustín hot spring complex was reported in 2010 and is noted for the preservation of plants growing around the complex by silicification. Along with the other fossils found at the site specimens of Equisetum thermale are highly detailed and complete.

The species was described from a part and counterpart pair of specimens, the holotype, number "MPM-PB 2029" which is currently preserved in the paleobotanical collections housed at the Museo Provincial Padre Jesús Molina, Río Gallegos, Santa Cruz, Argentina. The specimens were studied by a group of four Welsh and Argentinian paleobotanists led by Alan Channing of the School of Earth and Ocean Sciences, Cardiff University, Wales. Channing and his team published their 2011 type description for E. thermale in the American Journal of Botany. The etymology of the chosen specific name thermale is in recognition of both the geology of the type location and as a reference to the original habitat of a hot spring.

== Description ==
Equisetum thermale shows a combination of morphological characters found in both of the living Equisetum subgenera, E. subgenus Hippochaete and E. subgenus Equisetum. As with members of Equisetum (Equisetum), E. thermale has stoma, occasionally paired, placed on the surface of the stem on both irregular horizontal bands and in vertical files. E. thermale also show infrequent branching of the stems, a feature found only in Equisetum (Hippochaete). This combination is to the modern species Equisetum bogotense which is generally placed as a sister species to the subgenera. Overall the stems of E. thermale grew up to 10 centimetres (3.9 in) long and 0.7–4 millimetres (0.028–0.157 in) in diameter with between six and twelve ridges to the stem. Each of the nodes on the stem have up to twelve single veined leaves which correspond to the number of ridges on the stem.
