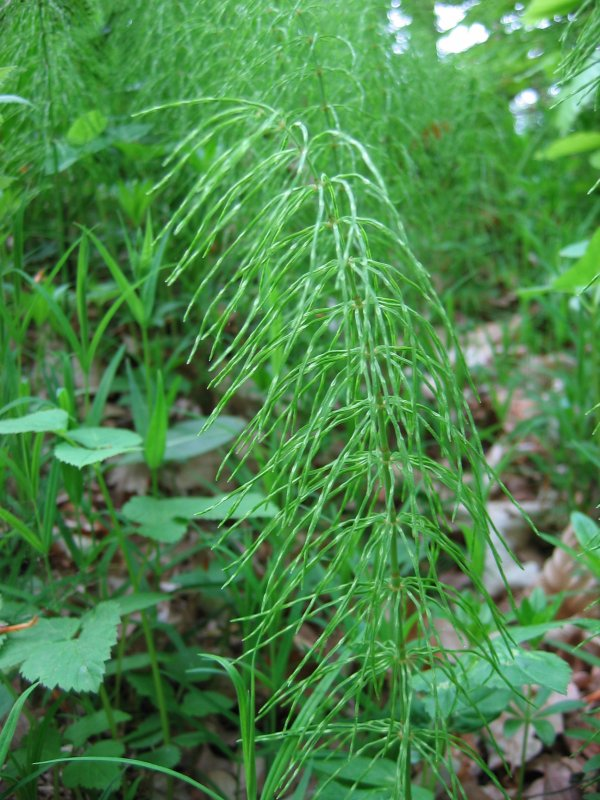
- Equisetum pratense

Conservation status
- Secure (NatureServe)

Scientific classification
- Kingdom: Plantae
- Clade: Tracheophytes
- Division: Polypodiophyta
- Class: Polypodiopsida
- Subclass: Equisetidae
- Order: Equisetales
- Family: Equisetaceae
- Genus: Equisetum
- Subgenus: E. subg. Equisetum
- Species: E. pratense

Binomial name
- Equisetum pratense Ehrh., 1784

= Equisetum pratense =

Meadow horsetail

Species of horsetail plant

Equisetum pratense, commonly known as meadow horsetail, shade horsetail or shady horsetail, is a widespread horsetail (Equisetophyta) and it is a pteridophyte. Shade horsetail can be commonly found in forests with tall trees or very thick foliage that can provide shade and tends to grow closer and thicker around streams, ponds and rivers. The specific epithet pratense is Latin, meaning pasture or meadow dwelling.

== Description ==
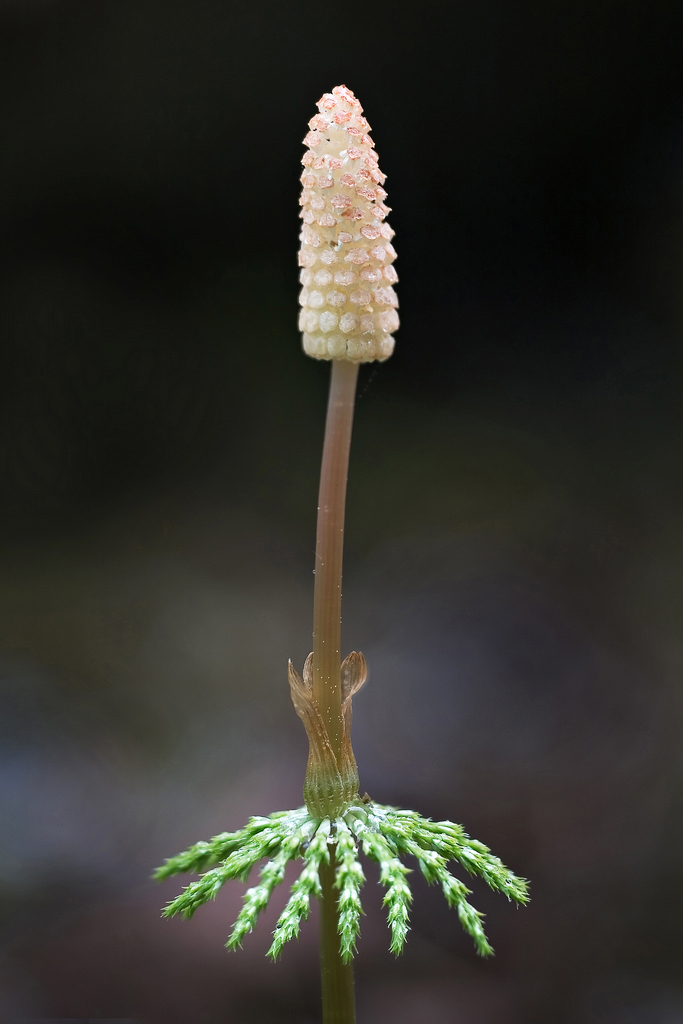
Fertile shoot with growing branches

Equisetum pratense has whitish-green and slender sterile stems that grow 15–52.5 cm (5.9–20.7 in) tall, with 8 to 20 ridges that bear three rows of flat spinules. The centrum is approximately one sixth of the diameter of the stem. The pale sheaths bear slender brown teeth with white margins.

Strobili containing the sporangium with the spores mature in late spring. The cone like strobilus is only present in the spring shoot which grows to resemble the coneless summer shoot.

== Habitat ==
Equisetum pratense occurs in alluvial woods, thickets, mossy glades, and calcareous meadows. It is a common pioneer species, commonly growing where instability or water erosion leaves an often open ground surface or where sandy alluvium accumulates beside streams. Where vegetation is more abundant, the fern occurs only as sparse and diminutive shoots, as the fern is succumbing to competition in a later seral community.

The plant is widespread, occurring from Iceland and northern Britain and Northern Ireland through northern and central Europe as far south as the Alps. It grows across most of northern Asia to Japan and through northern parts of North America from Alaska to Labrador.

== Toxicity ==
Equisetum pratense contains the enzyme thiaminase which destroys thiamine (vitamin B1). In sufficient quantity it is therefore toxic.
