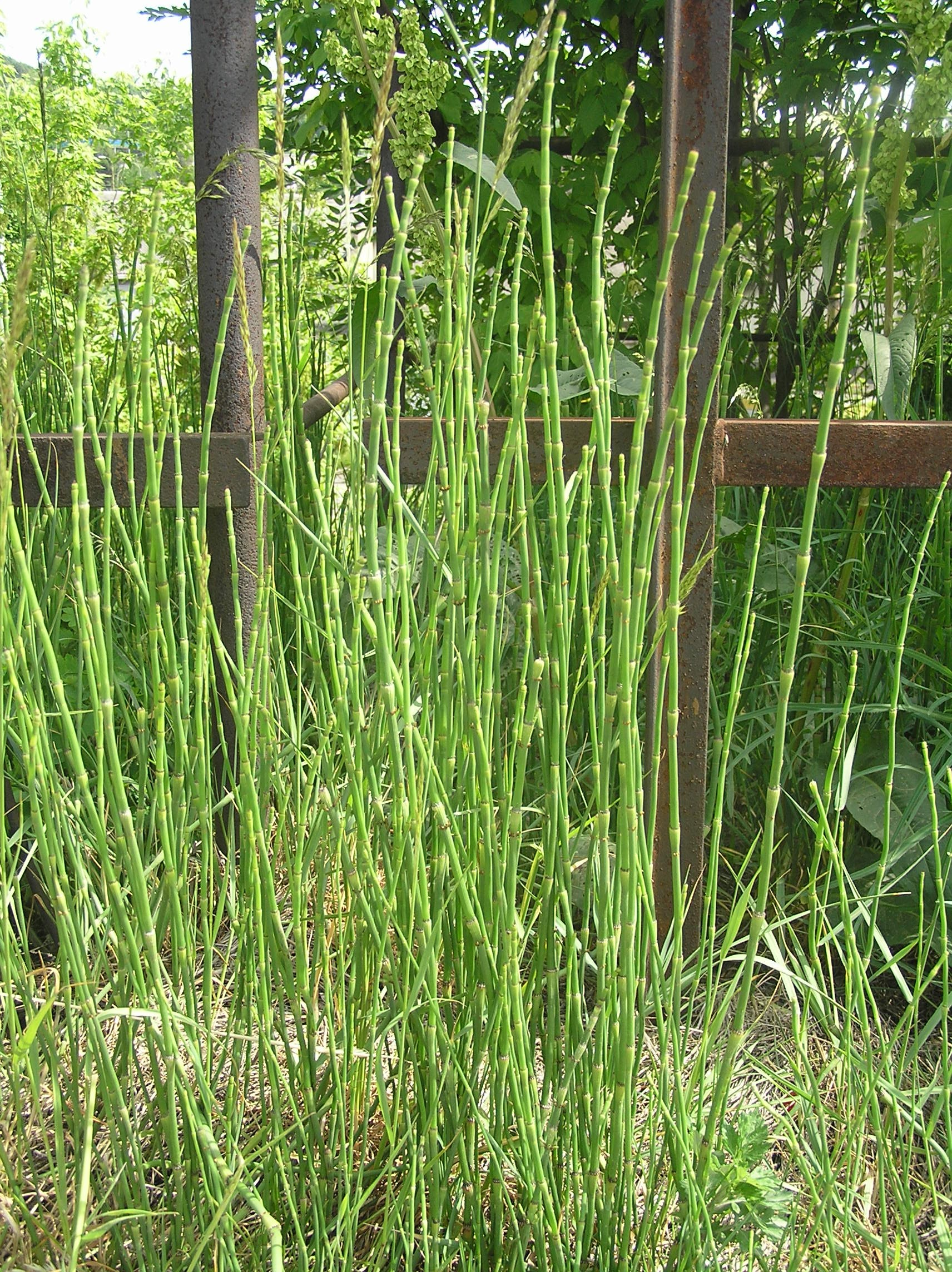

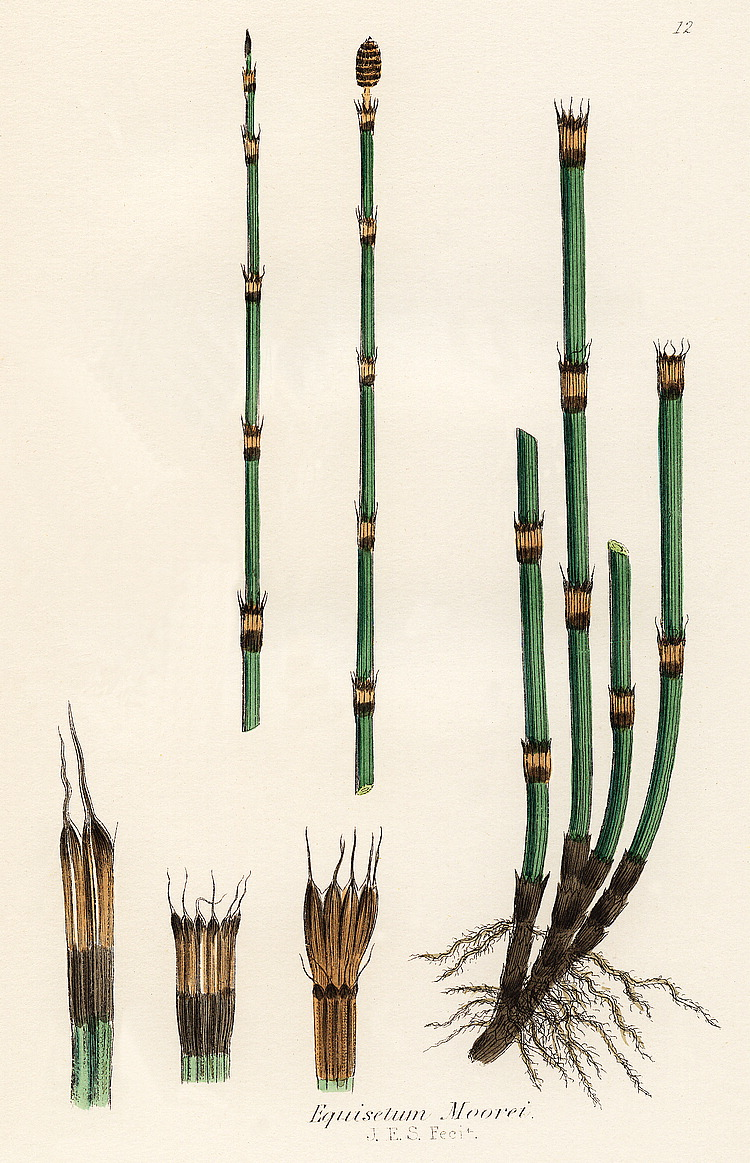

Scientific classification
- Kingdom: Plantae
- Clade: Tracheophytes
- Division: Polypodiophyta
- Class: Polypodiopsida
- Subclass: Equisetidae
- Order: Equisetales
- Family: Equisetaceae
- Genus: Equisetum
- Species: E. × moorei

Binomial name
- Equisetum × moorei Newman

= Equisetum × moorei =

Horsetail plant hybrid

Equisetum × moorei is a naturally occurring nothospecies of Equisetum native to Europe and Asia.

The hybrid formula is Equisetum hyemale × Equisetum ramosissimum.

== Distribution ==
The native range of the hybrid is Western to Central Europe, including the Baltic States, Ireland, Iceland and South European Russia as the furthest point in Europe. Additionally, it is native to Asia, namely Japan. It has notably gone extinct in Sweden.

== Habitat ==
Found in forests and damp, disturbed areas, such as clay banks and stream banks.
