= Equisetum xylochaetum =

Scientific classification
- Kingdom: Plantae
- Clade: Tracheophytes
- Division: Polypodiophyta
- Class: Polypodiopsida
- Subclass: Equisetidae
- Order: Equisetales
- Family: Equisetaceae
- Genus: Equisetum
- Species: E. xylochaetum

Binomial name
- Equisetum xylochaetum Mett.

Synonyms
- Equisetum giganteum var. poeppigianum A.Braun ex Milde; Equisetum lechleri Milde; Equisetum poeppigianum Mett.; Hippochaete xylochaeta (Mett.) Li Bing Zhang

Species of plant

Atacama Desert giant horsetail in Peru

Equisetum xylochaetum is a plant native to western South America, particularly the Atacama Desert. It is a horsetail.
