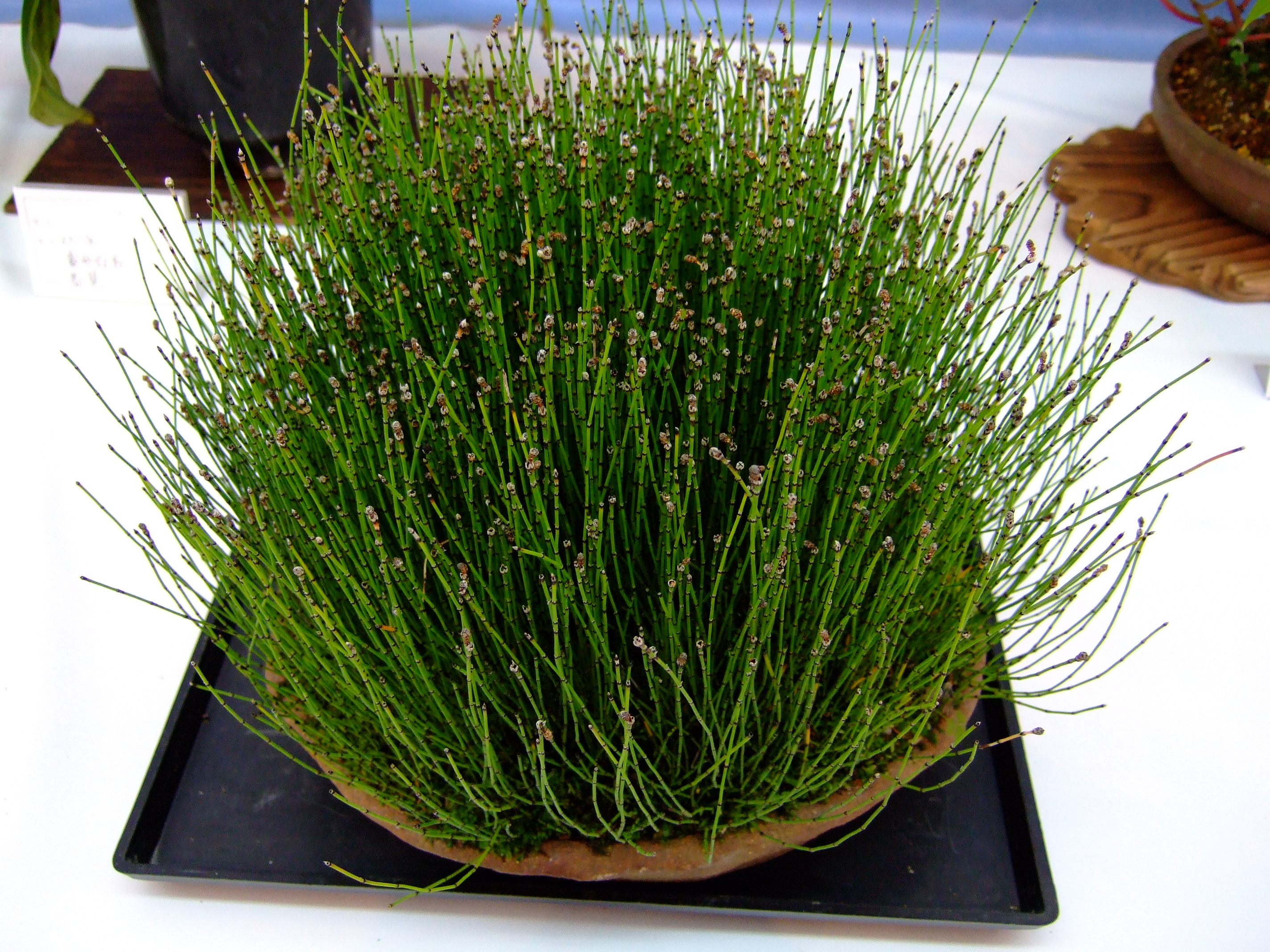

Conservation status
- Secure (NatureServe)

Scientific classification
- Kingdom: Plantae
- Clade: Tracheophytes
- Division: Polypodiophyta
- Class: Polypodiopsida
- Subclass: Equisetidae
- Order: Equisetales
- Family: Equisetaceae
- Genus: Equisetum
- Subgenus: E. subg. Hippochaete
- Species: E. variegatum

Binomial name
- Equisetum variegatum Schleich. ex Weber & Mohr

Synonyms
- Hippochaete variegata

= Equisetum variegatum =

Circumpolar species of horsetail plant

Equisetum variegatum, commonly known as variegated horsetail or variegated scouring rush, is a species of vascular plant in the horsetail family Equisetaceae. Like all horsetails, it is a type of fern. It is native to the northern hemisphere where it has a circumpolar distribution.

== Description ==
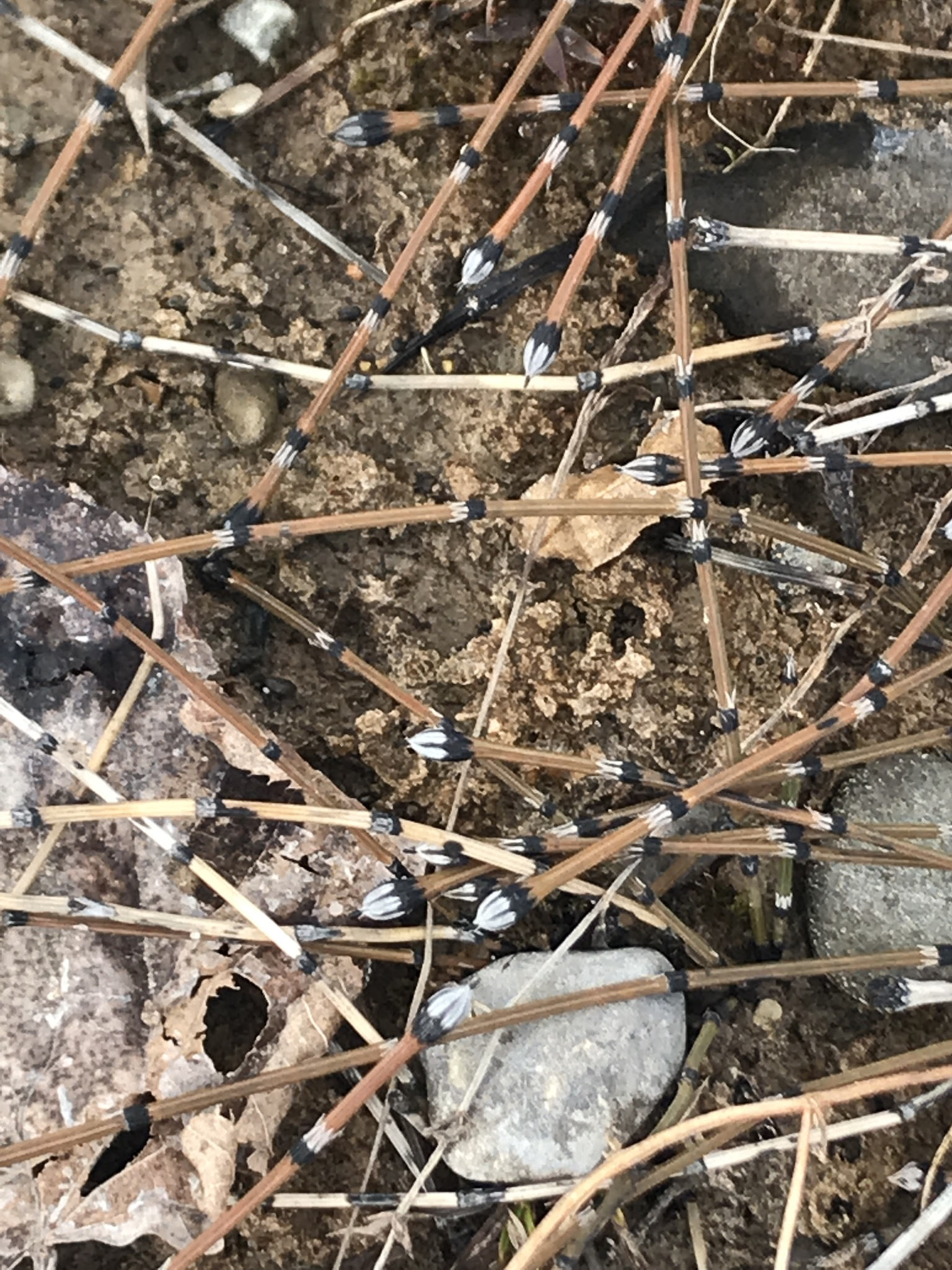
Observed in New York State in February

It is a variable species with several ecotypes, some of which are distinct subspecies. The stems can grow to 40 cm (occasionally 80 cm) in height but are often much smaller. Some forms have prostrate stems that creep along the ground while other forms grow more erect. The stems are dark blue-green, slender and rough to the touch. They may be unbranched or have branches growing from the base. The stem nodes are covered with a sheath that is marked with a black band and has dark teeth with white edges. The stems are tipped with a small cone, 3–4 mm across, which is usually green with a black, bluntly-pointed tip.

== Distribution and habitat ==
It has a circumpolar distribution in the northern hemisphere, where it is occurs in northern Europe, Asia and North America including Greenland, Iceland and the Faroe Islands. Its range extends south as far as the Pyrenees and Apennines in Europe, Mongolia and Japan in Asia and Connecticut, Wisconsin and Oregon in North America.

It prefers open, lime-rich sites, often those that flood in winter. It occurs in dune slacks, mountain flushes and beside lakes, rivers and canals.
