= Xyloglucan endotransglucosylase =

Xyloglucan endotransglucosylase (XET) is an apoplastic enzyme found across the plant kingdom. The enzyme catalyzes the endotransglucosylation of two xyloglucan polysaccharides, effectively 'stitching' them together.

== Function in planta ==
XET is thought to promote cell expansion by breaking the xyloglucan cross-links between cellulose microfibrils before reforming them, potentially now linked to another microfibril.
