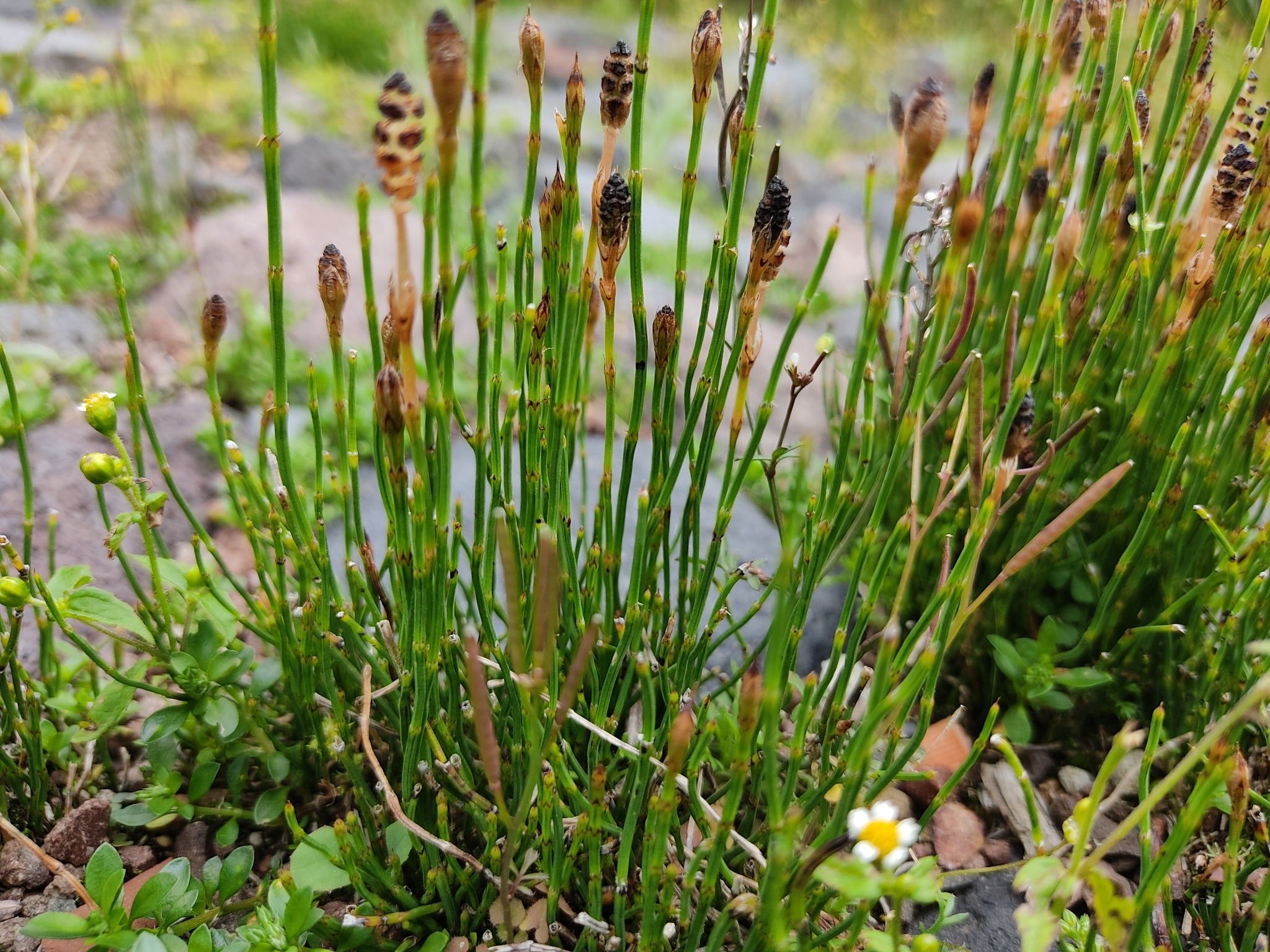

Scientific classification
- Kingdom: Plantae
- Clade: Tracheophytes
- Division: Polypodiophyta
- Class: Polypodiopsida
- Subclass: Equisetidae
- Order: Equisetales
- Family: Equisetaceae
- Genus: Equisetum
- Species: E. bogotense

Binomial name
- Equisetum bogotense Kunth

= Equisetum bogotense =

Andean horsetail

Species of fern

Equisetum bogotense, the Andean horsetail, is a herbaceous perennial that reproduces through spores. It has thicker, less bushy whorled branches, and a silica rich rhizomatous stem, which roots grow out of, under ground. This stem is a dull dark brown color with glabrous growth aside from the sheathed segments. The plant has a history as a traditional herbal remedy, and a study of its diuretic effects on humans showed significant increases in urinary sodium, potassium, and chloride. Human and animal trials of indicate that E. bogotense has "high" efficacy as a diuretic. It is used in several modern herbal supplements. The species epithet refers to Bogotá, the capital of Colombia.

According to a recent study, this species may be the most isolated of all the genus, as it is more closely related with fossil Equiseta rather than living ones. The estimated split between Equisetum bogotense and all other living Equisetum is estimated to have occurred no later than the Early Jurassic (about 170 Mya).
