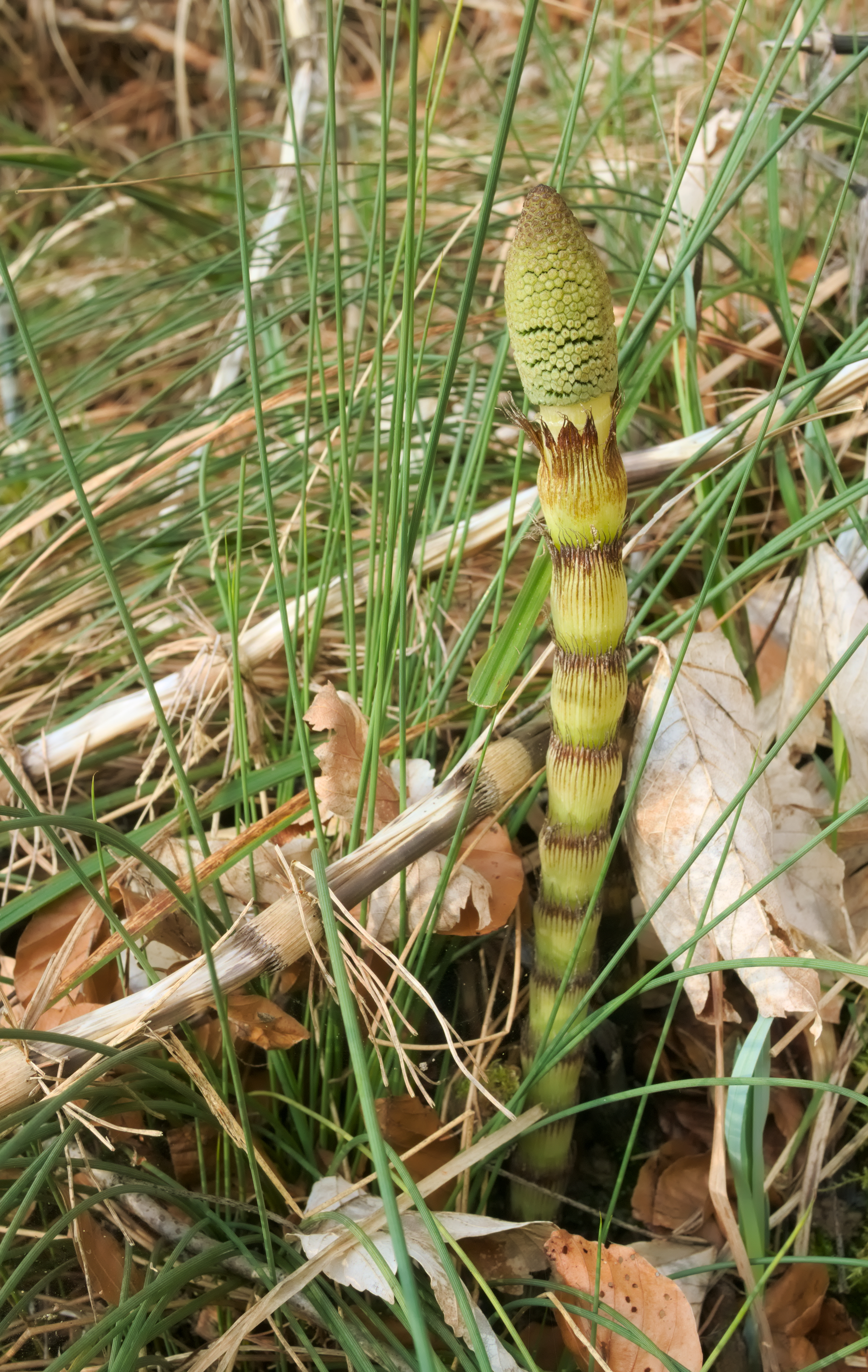
- Fertile (spore-bearing) stem in March at Zurich, Switzerland

Conservation status
- Least Concern (IUCN 3.1)

Scientific classification
- Kingdom: Plantae
- Clade: Tracheophytes
- Division: Polypodiophyta
- Class: Polypodiopsida
- Subclass: Equisetidae
- Order: Equisetales
- Family: Equisetaceae
- Genus: Equisetum
- Subgenus: E. subg. Equisetum
- Species: E. telmateia

Binomial name
- Equisetum telmateia Ehrh.

= Equisetum telmateia =

Species of plant in the horsetail family

Equisetum telmateia, the great horsetail, is a species of Equisetum (horsetail) native to Europe, western Asia and northwest Africa. It was formerly widely treated in a broader sense including a subspecies (subsp. braunii) in western North America, but this is now treated as a separate species, Equisetum braunii.

== Description ==
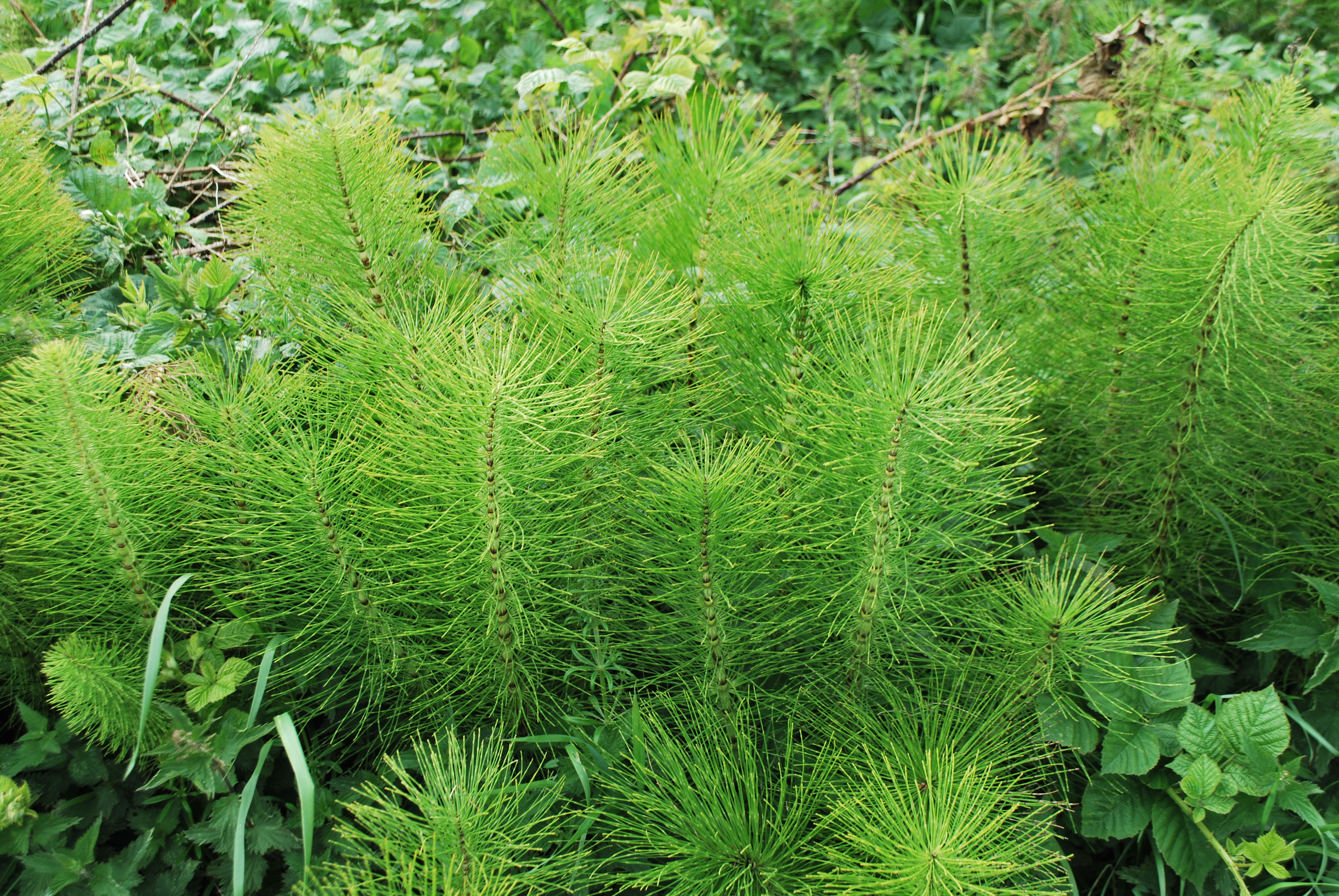
Sterile (foliage) stems in late May at Ormskirk, Lancashire, UK

It is a herbaceous perennial plant, with separate green photosynthetic sterile stems, and pale yellowish non-photosynthetic spore-bearing fertile stems. The sterile stems, produced in late spring and dying down in late autumn, are 30–150 cm (12–59 in) (rarely to 240 cm (94 in)) tall (the tallest species of horsetail outside of tropical regions) and 1 cm (0.39 in) diameter, heavily branched, with whorls of 14–40 branches, these up to 20 cm (7.9 in) long, 1–2 mm (3/64–5/64 in) diameter and unbranched, emerging from the axils of a ring of bracts; the main stem itself is whitish, without chlorophyll or stomata. The fertile stems are produced in early spring before the sterile shoots, growing to 15–45 cm (5.9–17.7 in) tall with an apical spore-bearing strobilus 4–10 cm (1.6–3.9 in) long and 1–2 cm (0.39–0.79 in) broad, and no side branches. The spores disperse in mid spring, with the fertile stems dying immediately after spore release. It also spreads by means of rhizomes that have been observed to penetrate 4 metres (13 ft) into wet clay soil, spreading laterally in multiple layers. Occasionally plants produce stems that are both fertile and photosynthetic.

== Distribution ==
Great horsetail is widespread across most of Europe north to 56° to 58° N. In Ireland and Great Britain, it is widespread and often common in suitable habitats, but scarcer in Scotland, particularly north of the Central Belt, except for a notable concentration on Skye; the northernmost population of the species anywhere is near Thurso on the north coast of Scotland at about 58°35' N. Further east, it does not reach so far north; in Sweden, it is rare and endangered, confined to just three locations north to about 56°08' N on the west coast of the southern province of Skåne. Its southern and eastern limits are less well mapped, but it occurs south to Madeira (32°45' N), the Atlas Mountains in northwest Africa, and Israel, and east to Iran; the easternmost mapped on iNaturalist ('research grade' records only) is at 52°58' E in Iran.

== Habitat ==
It is found in damp shady places, spring fens and seepage lines, usually in open woodlands, commonly forming large clonal colonies.
