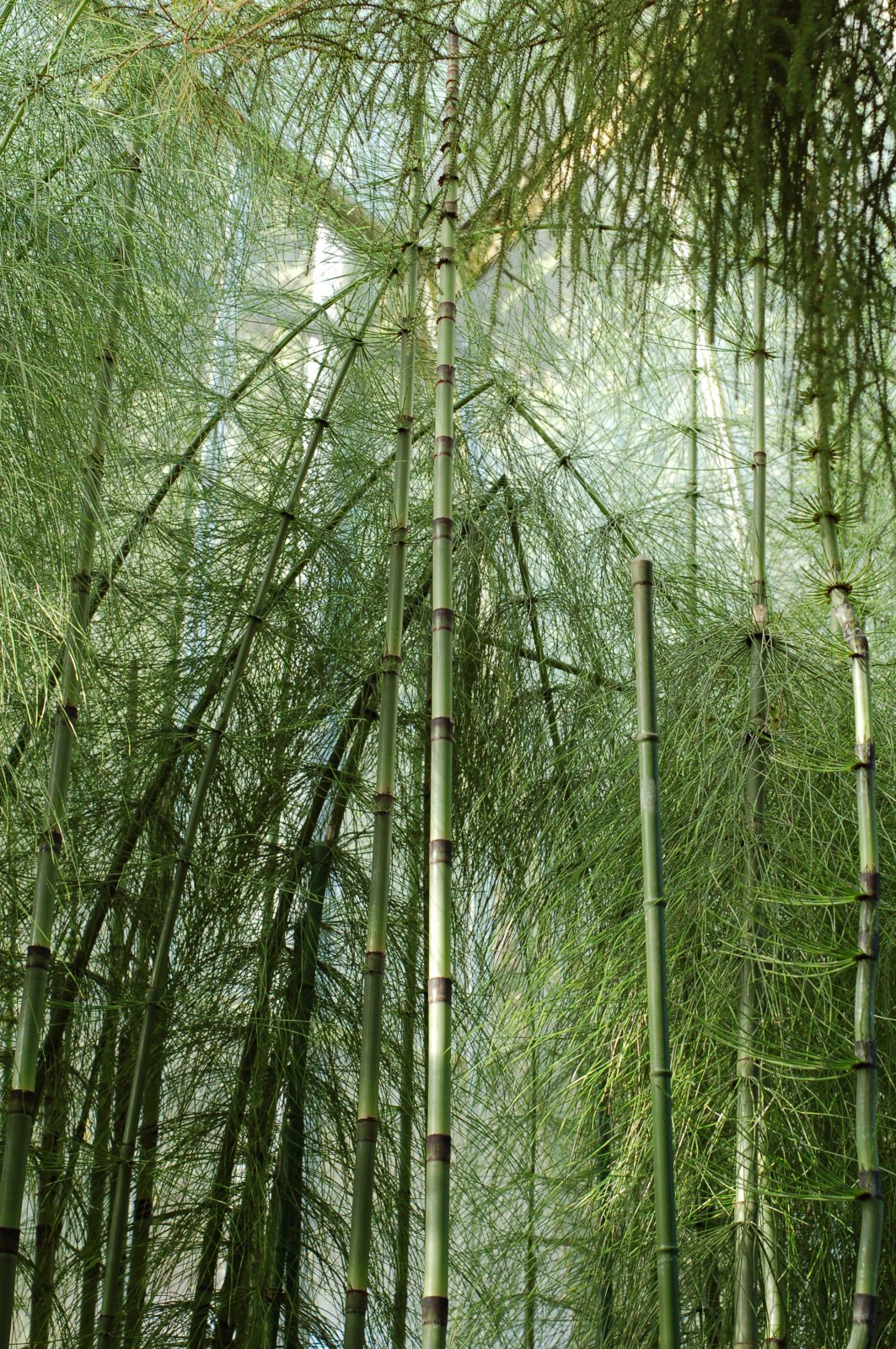
- Equisetum myriochaetum at the Royal Botanic Gardens, Edinburgh

Scientific classification
- Kingdom: Plantae
- Clade: Tracheophytes
- Division: Polypodiophyta
- Class: Polypodiopsida
- Subclass: Equisetidae
- Order: Equisetales
- Family: Equisetaceae
- Genus: Equisetum
- Subgenus: E. subg. Hippochaete
- Species: E. myriochaetum

Binomial name
- Equisetum myriochaetum Schltdl. and Cham., 1830

= Equisetum myriochaetum =

Species of plant in the horsetail family

Equisetum myriochaetum, also known as Mexican giant horsetail, is a species of horsetail that is native to Nicaragua, Costa Rica, Colombia, Venezuela, Ecuador, Peru and Mexico. It is the largest horsetail species, commonly reaching 4.6 metres (15 ft), with the largest recorded specimen having a height of 7.3 metres (24 ft). At each node is a whorl of as many as 32 branchlets. It is semi-aquatic and is often found growing on riverbanks. The species is harvested for medicinal uses and testing.

== Medicinal uses ==
The Mexican giant horsetail has been used as a diuretic in traditional medicine. In Mexico, the plant is commonly used for its hypoglycemic effects to aid in kidney disease and type-2 diabetes. Research has been looking into antioxidant, antiproliferative property. Its antioxidant activity has been considered as a possible treatment for cervical cancer, with its antiproliferative properties observed in tests on ovarian cancer but this research is in early phases. Like other members of the Equisetum family, the Mexican giant horsetail contains a large amount of biogenic silica, which is used to make silicon products. Silica products range from crop protection to various tinctures and house remedies but these can be dangerous as all known members of the horsetail family contain thiaminase.
