= Carl August Julius Milde =

German bryologist and pteridologist

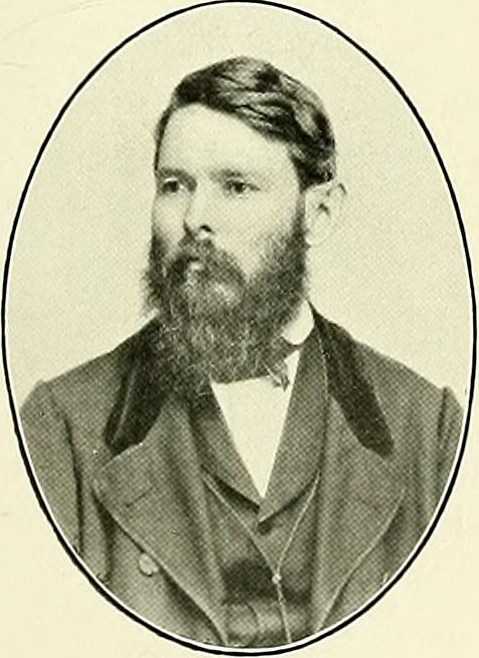
Carl August Julius Milde

Carl August Julius Milde (2 November 1824 – 3 July 1871) was a German bryologist and pteridologist born in Breslau.

In 1850 he obtained his medical doctorate from the University of Breslau, where he was a student of Heinrich Göppert (1800–1884). From 1853, he was an Oberlehrer at a Realschule in Breslau.

Milde specialized in research of cryptogams, particularly mosses and ferns. He might have issued and distributed exsiccata specimens under the title Bryotheca Silesiaca. Milde cooperated with Karl Gustav Limpricht. The botanical genus Mildella from the family Pteridaceae was named in his honor by Vittore Benedetto Antonio Trevisan. In 1876, American botanical artist Charles Edward Faxon (1846–1918) published a translation of Milde's Botrychiorum Monographia. Other written works of his include:

- Die höheren Sporenpflanzen Deutschland's und der Schweiz, (The higher spore plants of Germany and Switzerland), 1865.
- Bryologia silesiaca, (Silesian bryology), 1869.

Milde suffered from respiratory ailments for most of his adult life, and died at the age of 46 in Meran, location of a popular spa that he sometimes visited for treatment.
