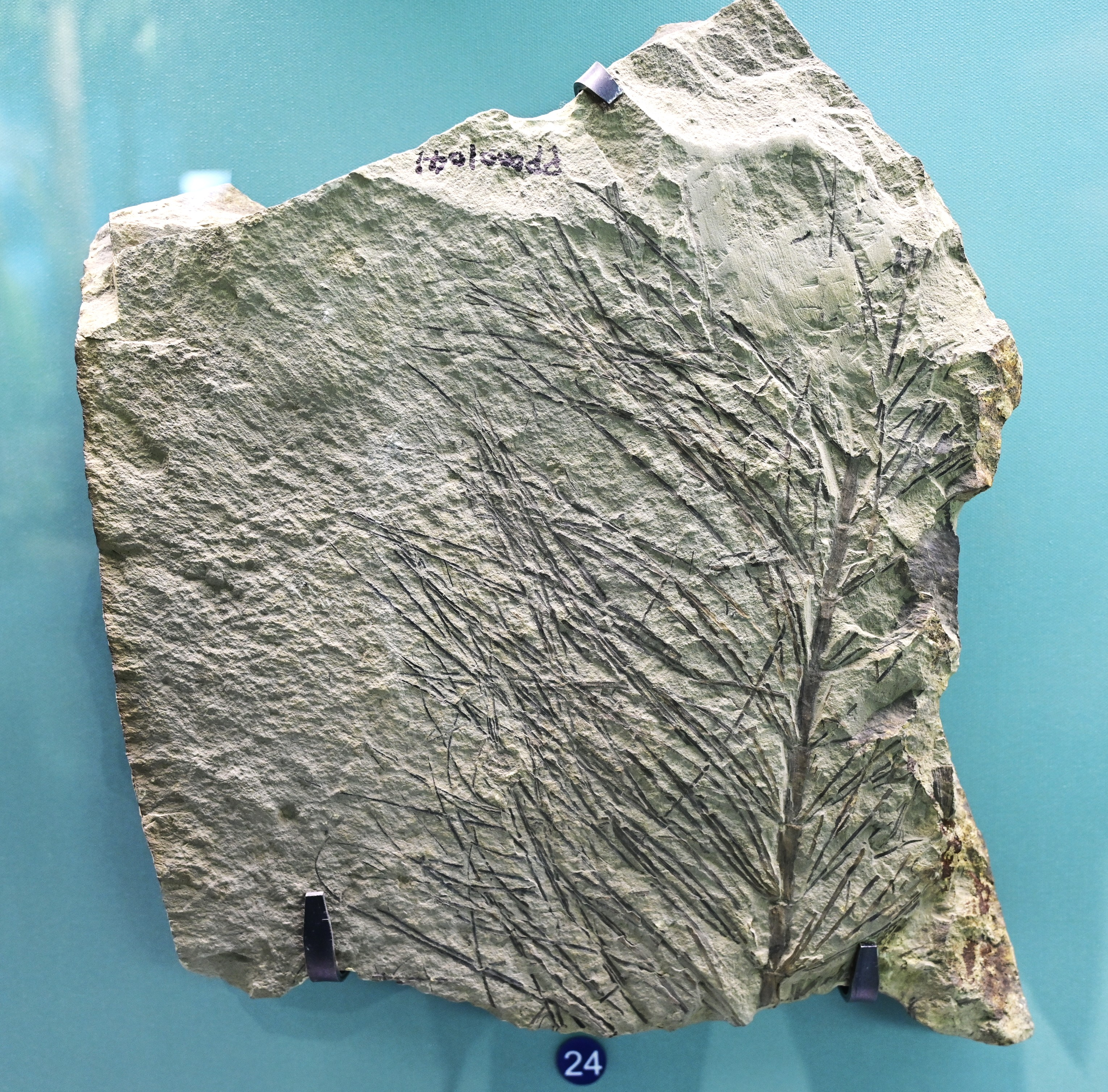
- Fossil specimen, National Natural History Museum of China

Scientific classification
- Kingdom: Plantae
- Division: Pteridophyta
- Class: Equisetopsida
- Order: Equisetales
- Family: †Neocalamitaceae
- Genus: †Neocalamites Halle, 1908

Species
- Neocalamites merianii; Neocalamites hoerensis

= Neocalamites =

Neocalamites Temporal range: Late Permian–Late Jurassic

Extinct genus of horsetails

Neocalamites is an extinct genus of equisetalean plant. Neocalamites thrived during the Permian and Triassic, and occurs worldwide.

== Description ==
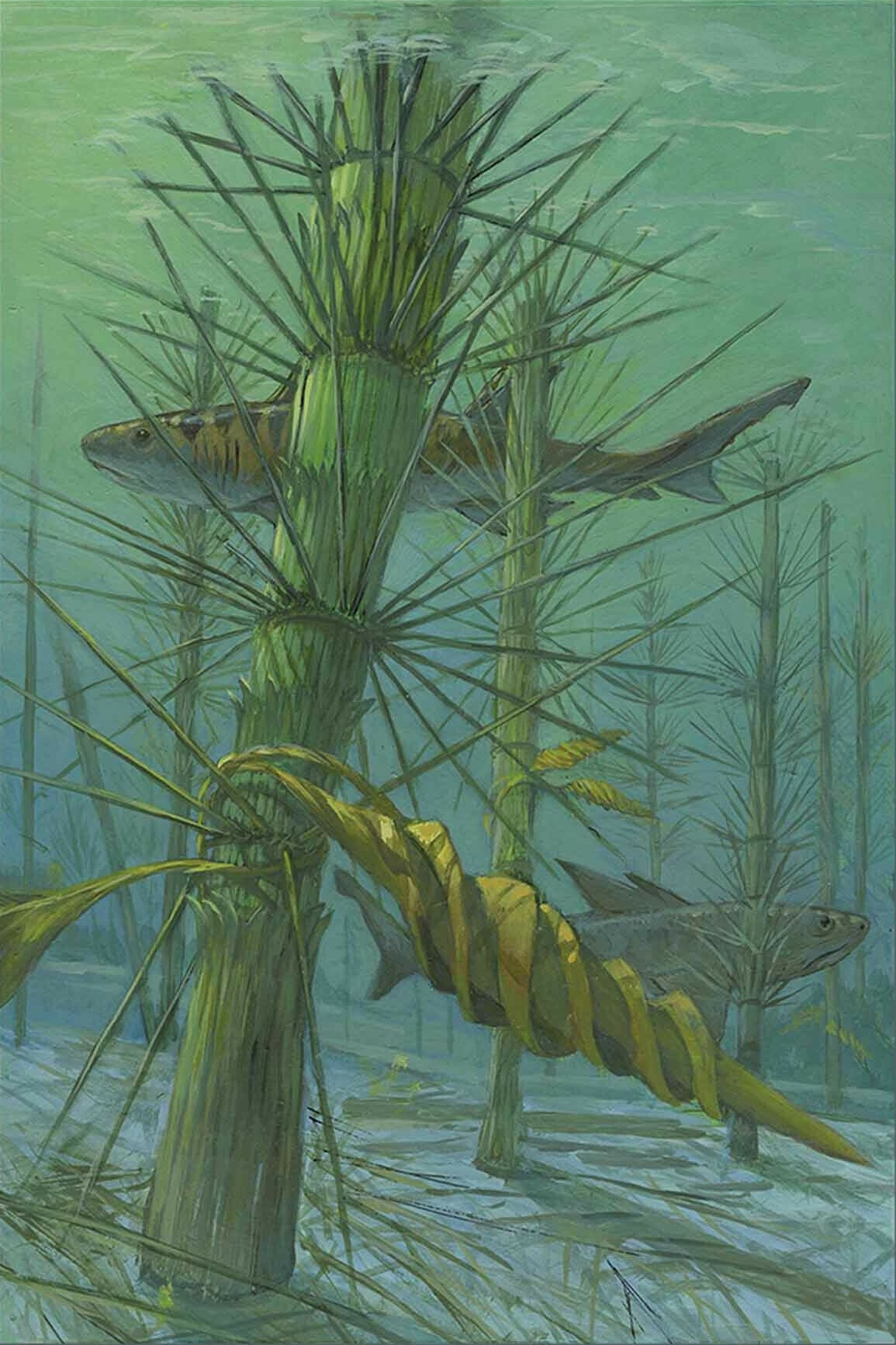
Illustration of Neocalamites stems growing in an estuarine environment, with attached hybodont egg cases (Palaeoxyris) and hybodonts in the background

According to Elgorriaga et al. 2018, characteristics of Neocalamites include: "(1) aerial stems with continuous ribs across nodes, (2) whorls of unfused leaves as in archaeocalamitacean plants, (3) compact strobili consisting of successive whorls of peltate sporangiophores, and (4) bearing six or more sporangia per sporangiophore as in equisetacean strobili." The leaves are similar to those of Annularia while the stems closely resemble those of Calamites. It is disputed as to whether members of the genus have secondary xylem. Neocalamites is suggested to have had a herbaceous to shrub like habit. It is suggested to have grown in wet habitats, such as on the banks of rivers.

== Taxonomy ==
Recent phylogenetic analysis has placed the genus as more closely related to modern Equisetaceae than to Calamitaceae. Cladogram after Elgorriaga et al, 2018

- Equisetales
  - Archaeocalamitaceae
    - Protocalamostachys
    - Peltotheca
  - - - - Paracalamitina
        - Cruciaetheca
      - Calamitaceae
    - - Neocalamites
      - Equisetaceae
        - Equisetites arenaceus
        - - Spaciinodum
          - Equisetum

== Chronology ==
According to Villalva et al. 2023 the chronological range of the genus spans from the Late Permian to the Late Jurassic.
