= Phyllotheca =

Phyllotheca Temporal range: Permian

Scientific classification
- Kingdom: Plantae
- Clade: Embryophytes
- Clade: Tracheophytes
- Division: Polypodiophyta
- Class: Polypodiopsida
- Subclass: Equisetidae
- Order: Equisetales
- Family: †Phyllothecaceae
- Genus: †Phyllotheca; Brongniart (1828)

Species
- P. australis; P. brevifolia; P. griesbachii; P. indica; P. longifolia

Extinct genus of ferns

Phyllotheca is an extinct genus of equisetalean, related to modern horsetails. It is known from the Permian period, as well as possibly the Carboniferous. It was named was created in 1828, when Brongniart described the type species Phyllotheca australis coming from Hawkesbury River, Australia.

== Species ==
- Phyllotheca australis: Initially described by Brongniart coming from Australia.
- Phyllotheca brevifolia: Described by Roesler, Boardman and Iannuzzi. Found in Paleorrota geopark on Morro Papaléo in Mariana Pimentel, Brazil. The area is in Rio Bonito Formation dating from Sakmarian in the Permian.
- Phyllotheca indica: Described by Towrow in 1955. Coming from India.
- Phyllotheca longifolia: Described by Roesler and Boardman. Found in Paleorrota geopark on Morro Papaléo in Mariana Pimentel, Brazil. The area is in Rio Bonito Formation dating from Sakmarian in the Permian.

Claimed records from the Jurassic of Poland are doubtful and may represent Neocalamites instead.
