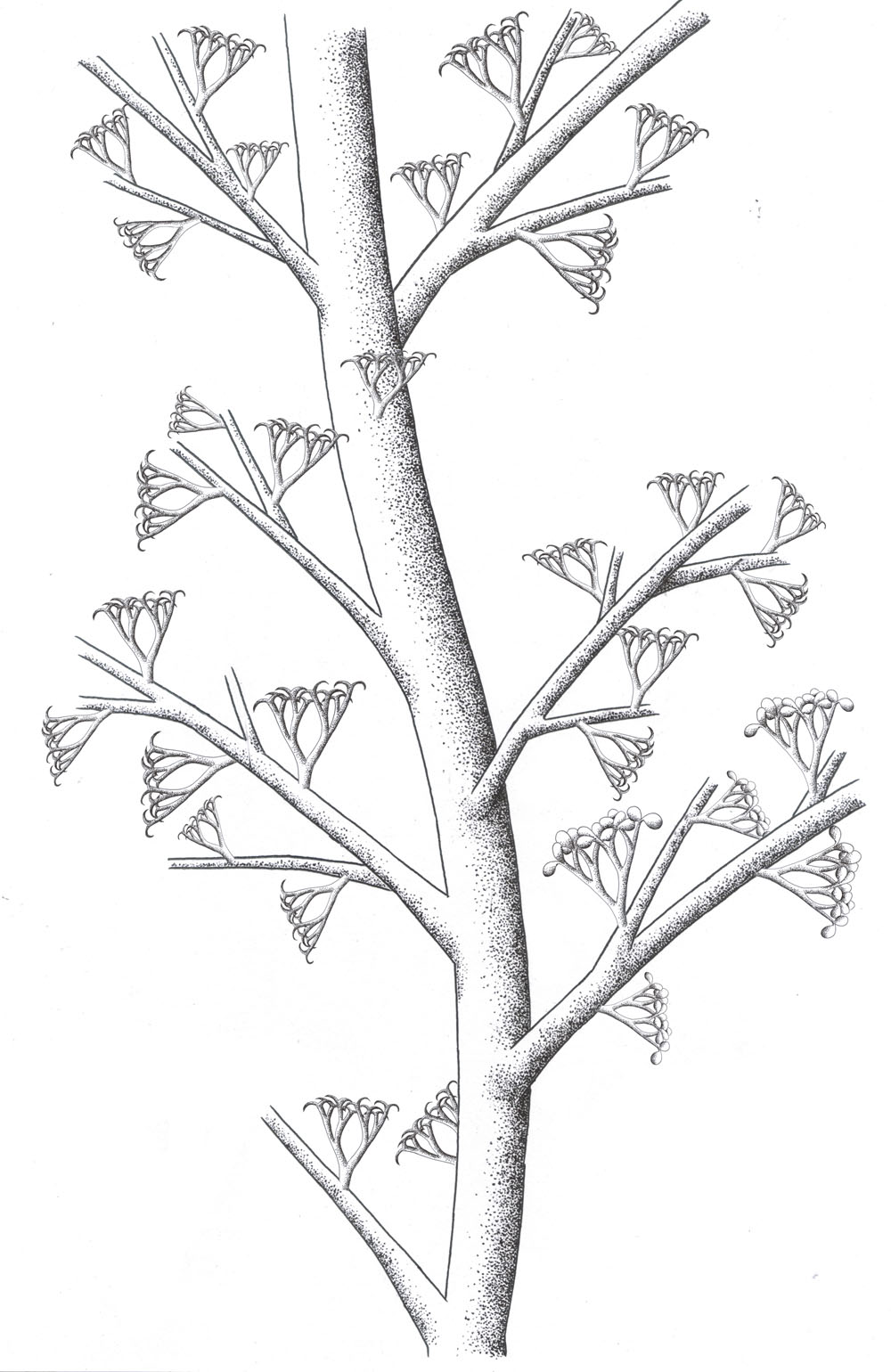

Scientific classification
- Kingdom: Plantae
- Division: Pteridophyta
- Class: †Cladoxylopsida
- Order: †Ibykales
- Family: †Ibykaceae
- Genus: †Ibyka Skog & Banks (1973)

Type species
- Ibyka amphikoma Skog & Banks (1973)

Species
- †I. amphikoma Skog & Banks (1973); †I. vogtii (Høeg 1942) Berry (2005)

= Ibyka =

Ibyka Temporal range: Middle Devonian–Upper Devonian

Extinct genus of ferns

Ibyka is an extinct genus of Iridopteridales, and a possible ancestor to horsetails.
The name comes from the poet Ibykos because the discovery of the fossil was due to the activity of construction cranes during the construction of the Gilboa Dam. The probable relationships within Equisetopsida are shown in the cladogram below. The position where Ibyka would be added.

- - ?†Ibyka
  - - †Pseudobornia ursina
    - - †Sphenophyllales
      - - †Archaeocalamitaceae
        - - †Calamitaceae
          - Equisetaceae
