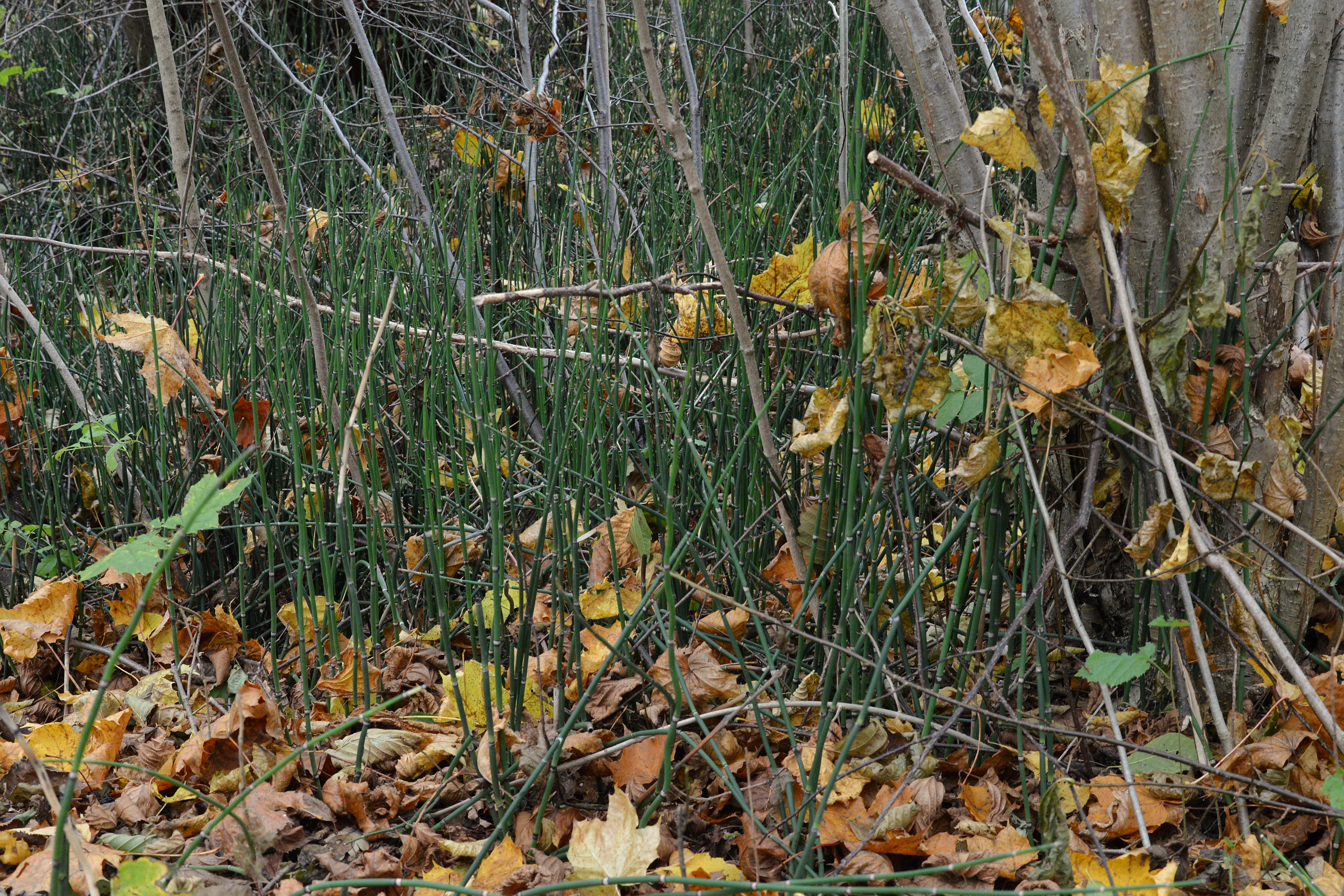
- Equisetum hyemale at Bærum near Oslo in Norway

Conservation status
- Least Concern (IUCN 3.1)

Scientific classification
- Kingdom: Plantae
- Clade: Embryophytes
- Clade: Tracheophytes
- Division: Polypodiophyta
- Class: Polypodiopsida
- Subclass: Equisetidae
- Order: Equisetales
- Family: Equisetaceae
- Genus: Equisetum
- Subgenus: E. subg. Hippochaete
- Species: E. hyemale

Binomial name
- Equisetum hyemale L.

Synonyms
- Hippochaete hyemalis (L.) Bruhin

= Equisetum hyemale =

Species of horsetail plant

Equisetum hyemale, commonly known as rough horsetail or scouring rush, is an evergreen perennial herbaceous pteridophyte in the horsetail family Equisetaceae native to Eurasia and Greenland. It was formerly widely treated in a broader sense including a subspecies (subsp. affine) in North America, but this is now treated as a separate species, Equisetum praealtum.

== Distribution ==
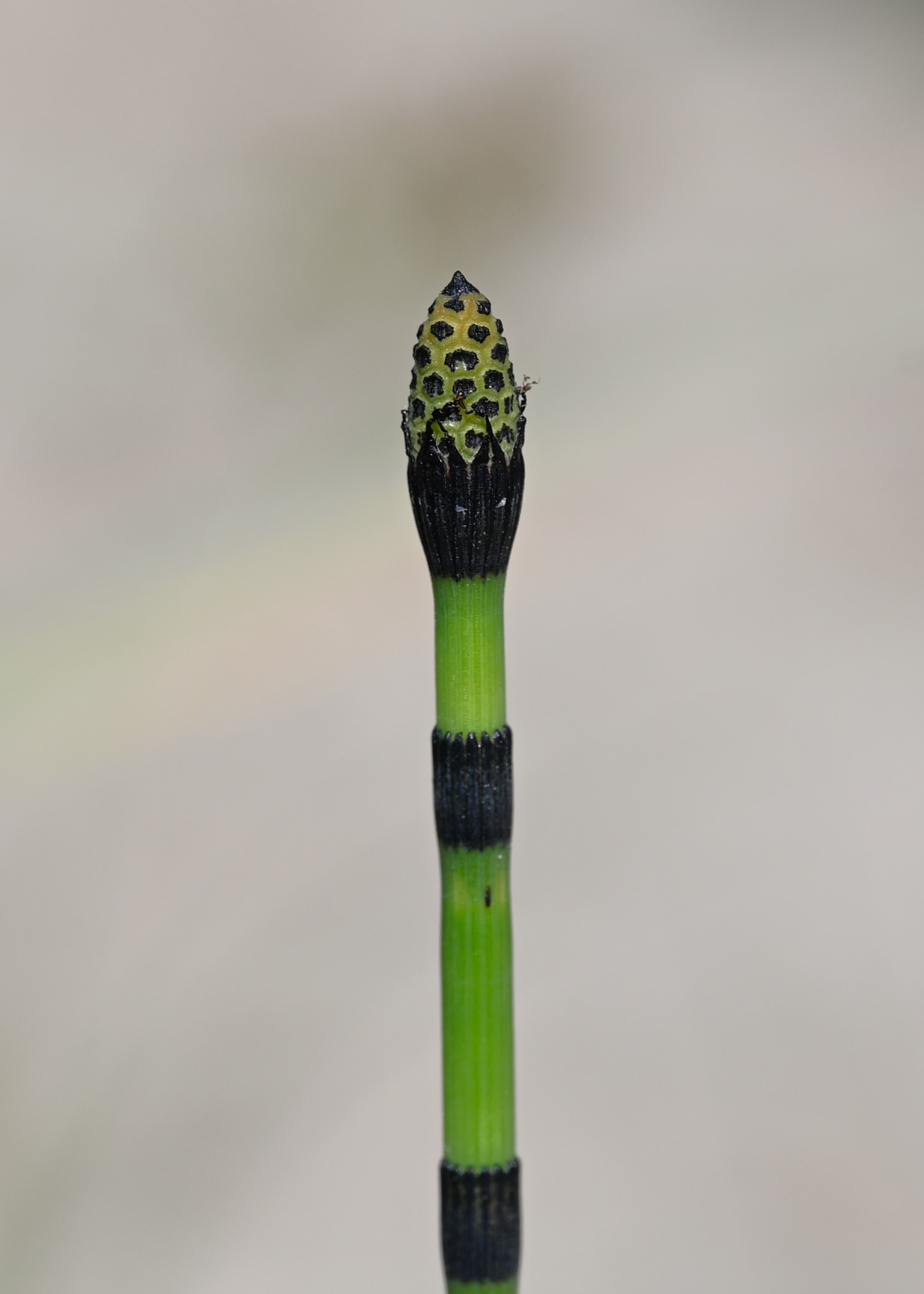
Equisetum hyemale strobilus, at Darłówko on the Baltic Sea coast of Poland

Equisetum hyemale is native to Iceland, Greenland, and central and northern Eurasia, including Kamchatka and Japan, where it forms clonal colonies in mesic (reliably moist) habitats, often in heavy clay or sandy soils in riparian zones of rivers and streams where it can withstand occasional flooding, but also in lime-rich upland flushes and seeps, and can indicate their presence when not flowing. Other habitats include moist forest and woodland openings, lake and pond shores, ditches, marshes and swamps. It grows from between sea level to 2,000 metres (6,600 ft) in elevation. It has been introduced into Tasmania.

== Description ==
Equisetum hyemale has vertical jointed reed-like stalks of medium to dark green. The hollow stems are up to 30–100 centimetres (12–39 in) in height, and are rarely branched. The stems are 3–6 mm thick with 10–30 conspicuous ridges, which are impregnated with silica and rough to the touch (from which the English name derives). The tiny leaves are joined around the stem, forming a narrow black-green band or sheath at each joint. Like other pteridophytes, the plant reproduces by spores and does not produce flowers or seeds.

In Australia, Equisetum hyemale can grow up to 2 m (6 ft 7 in) tall with stems up to 15 mm (0.59 in) thick. It usually grows from rhizome or tuber fragments instead of spores.

The stems remain green during winter in warmer climates, but are generally deciduous in cold climates. It forms dense spreading colonies in full to partial sun.

== Taxonomy ==
Linnaeus was the first to describe rough horsetail with the binomial Equisetum hyemale in his Species Plantarum of 1753.

Two Equisetum plants are sold commercially under the names Equisetum japonicum (barred horsetail) and Equisetum camtschatcense (Kamchatka horsetail). These are both types of E. hyemale, although they may also be listed as varieties of E. hyemale.

== Uses ==
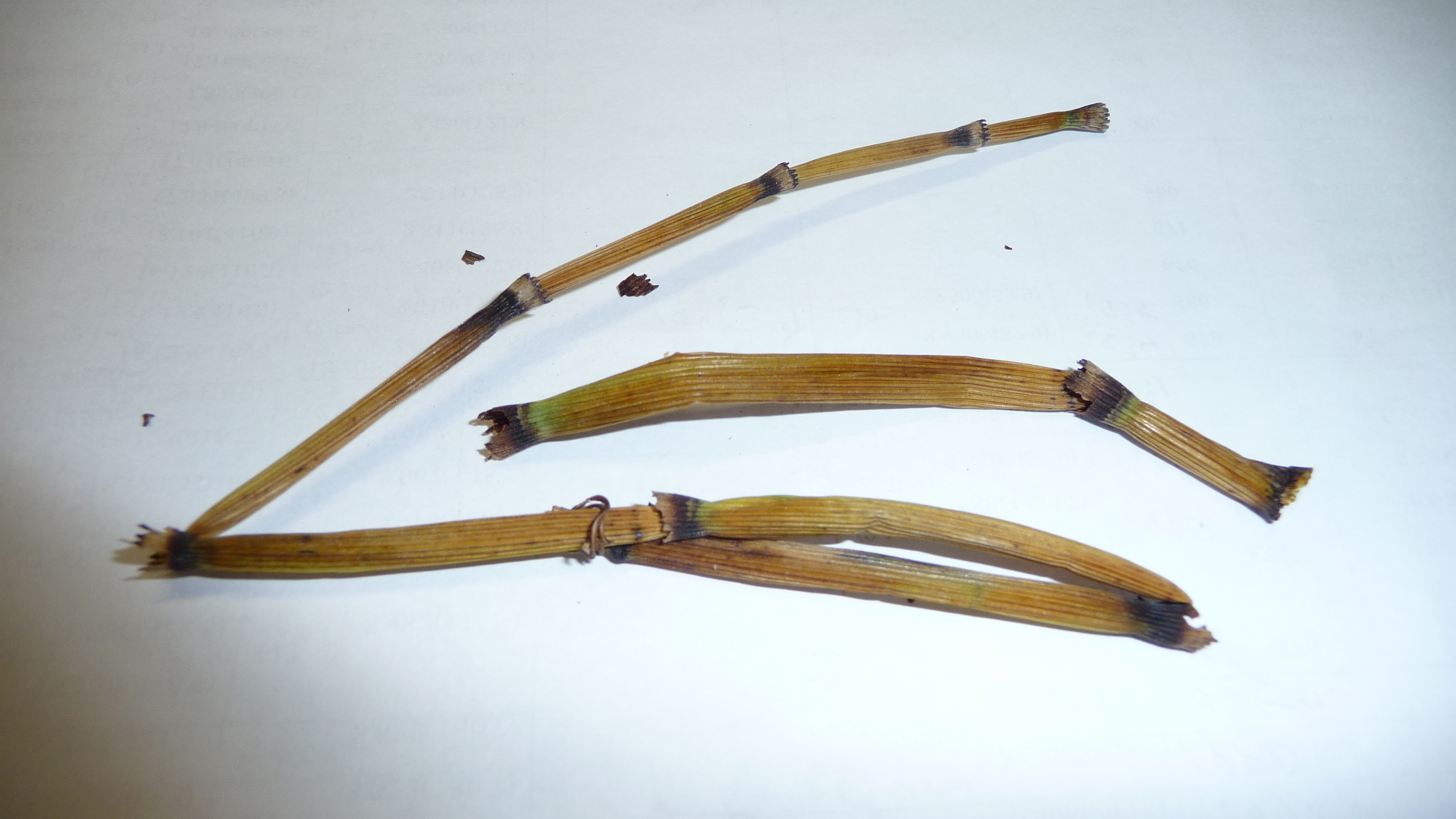
Dried plant, used as traditional polishing material like fine grits class sandpaper in Japan

=== Domestic ===
Boiled and dried Equisetum hyemale is used as traditional polishing material, similar to a fine grit sandpaper, in Japan.

Music

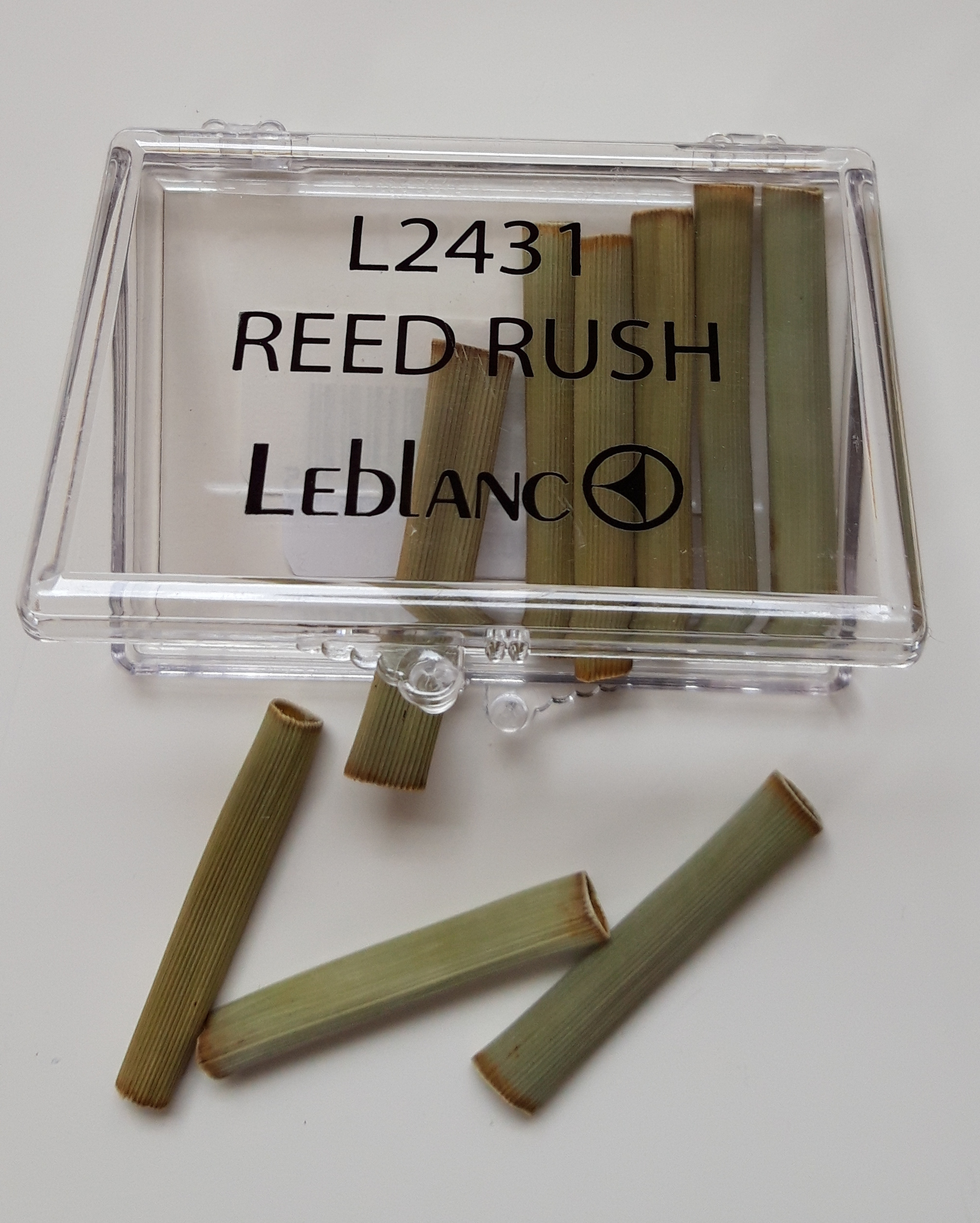
Dried stems used to shape clarinet reeds.

The stems are used to shape the reeds of reed instruments such as clarinets or saxophones.

=== Cultivation ===
Equisetum hyemale cultivated as an ornamental plant, for use in contained garden beds and planters, and in pots. It is a popular "icon plant" in contemporary Modernist and East Asian style garden design. Its tight verticality fits into narrow planting spaces between walkways and walls, and on small balconies.

It is also used as an accent plant in garden ponds and ornamental pools, and other landscape water features, planted in submerged pots.

The plant is sometimes sold in the nursery trade as "barred horsetail" or "Equisetum japonicum", but is different in appearance to Equisetum ramosissimum var. japonicum.

==== Invasive behaviour ====
In South Africa and Australia, the plant is an invasive species of moist natural habitats.
