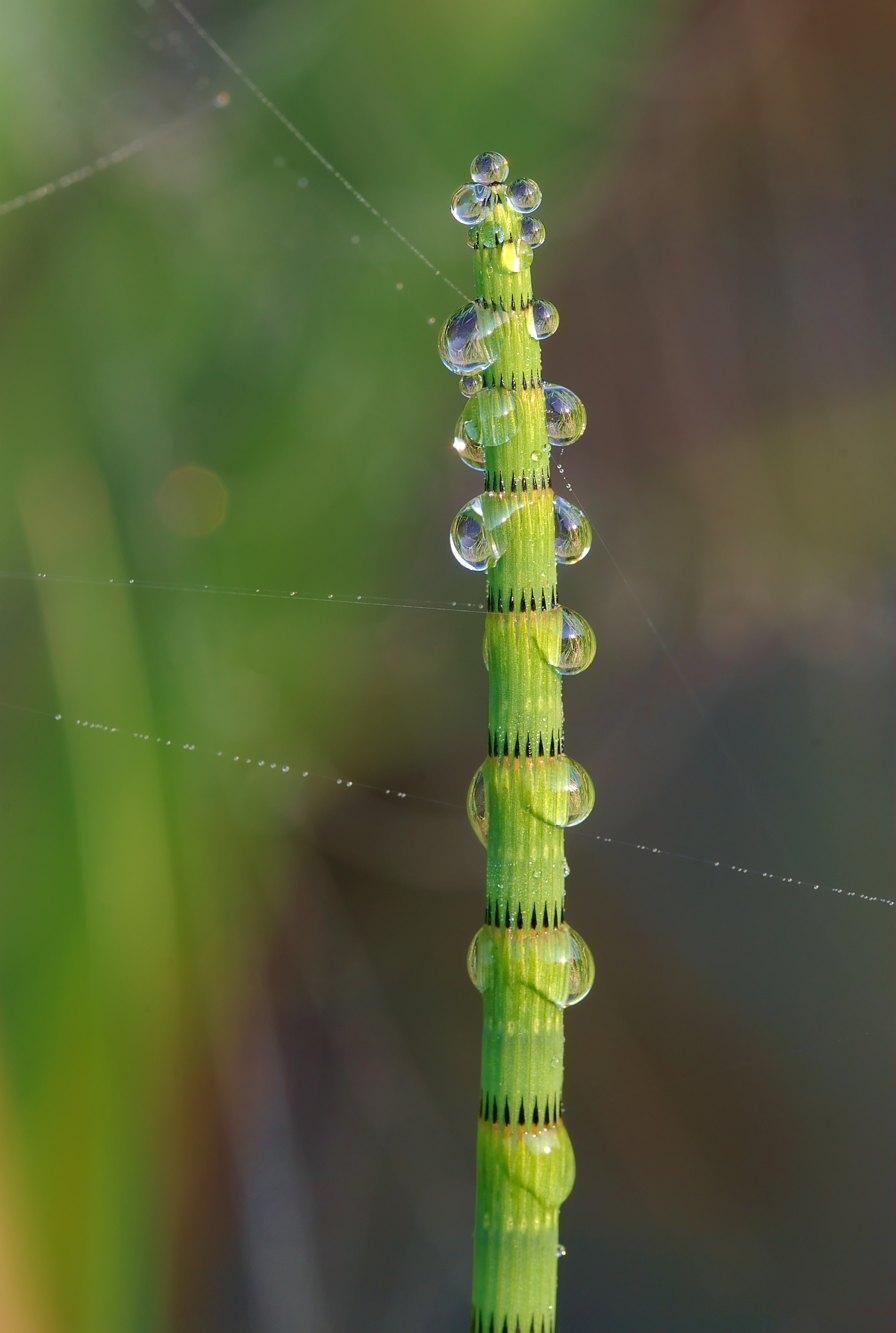

Conservation status
- Least Concern (IUCN 3.1)

- Secure (NatureServe)

Scientific classification
- Kingdom: Plantae
- Clade: Tracheophytes
- Division: Polypodiophyta
- Class: Polypodiopsida
- Subclass: Equisetidae
- Order: Equisetales
- Family: Equisetaceae
- Genus: Equisetum
- Subgenus: E. subg. Equisetum
- Species: E. fluviatile

Binomial name
- Equisetum fluviatile L.

Synonyms
- List: Equisetum fluviatile var. attenuatum (Milde) A.A.Eaton; Equisetum fluviatile f. attenuatum (Milde) Vict. ex Dutilly & Lepage; Equisetum fluviatile var. brachycladon (Döll) A.A.Eaton; Equisetum fluviatile var. intermedium A.A.Eaton; Equisetum fluviatile var. leptocladon (Döll) A.A.Eaton; Equisetum fluviatile var. limosum (L.) Farw.; Equisetum fluviatile f. limosum (L.) Satou; Equisetum fluviatile f. linnaeanum (Döll) M.Broun; Equisetum fluviatile f. minus M.Broun; Equisetum fluviatile f. natans (Vict.) M.Broun; Equisetum fluviatile var. polystachium (Brückn.) A.A.Eaton; Equisetum fluviatile f. polystachium (Brückn.) M.Broun; Equisetum fluviatile f. uliginosum (Muhl. ex Willd.) Macloskie & Dusén; Equisetum fluviatile var. verticillatum (Döll) A.A.Eaton; Equisetum limosum L.; Equisetum limosum var. attenuatum Milde; Equisetum limosum f. brachycladon Döll; Equisetum limosum var. candelabrum Hook.; Equisetum limosum var. leptocladon Döll; Equisetum limosum f. leptocladon Döll; Equisetum limosum f. linnaeanum Döll; Equisetum limosum var. minus A.Braun ex Engelm.; Equisetum limosum f. minus Döll; Equisetum limosum f. natans Vict.; Equisetum limosum f. polystachium (Brückn.) Luerss.; Equisetum limosum var. polystachyum A.Braun ex Engelm.; Equisetum limosum var. verticillatum Döll; Equisetum majus Schinz & Thell.; Equisetum polystachium Brückn.; Equisetum uliginosum Muhl. ex Willd.

= Equisetum fluviatile =

Water horsetail

Species of plant in the horsetail family

Equisetum fluviatile, the water horsetail or swamp horsetail, is a vascular plant in the horsetail family Equisetaceae. It is a perennial herbaceous pteridophyte that reproduces using spores.

== Description ==
The green stems grow 50–150 cm (20–59 in) tall and 2–8 mm thick. The leaf sheaths are narrow, with 15–20 black-tipped teeth. Many, but not all, stems also have whorls of short ascending and spreading branches 1–5 cm (0.4–2.0 in) long, with the longest branches on the lower middle of the stem. The side branches are slender, dark green, and have 1–8 nodes with a whorl of five scale leaves at each node.

The water horsetail has one of the largest central hollows of the horsetails, with 80% of the stem diameter typically being hollow.

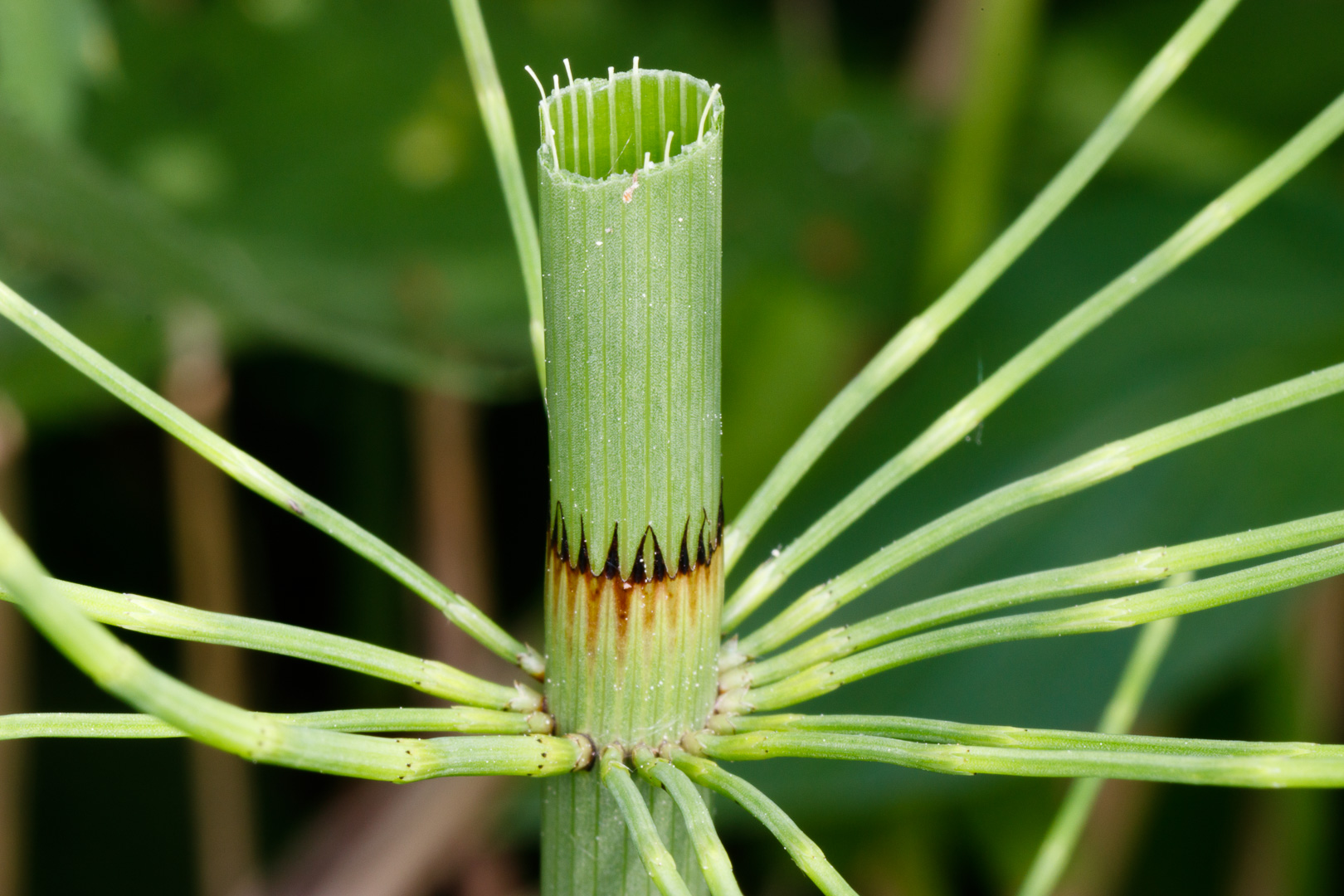
Equisetum fluviatile – a broken stem with the central hollow exposed

The stems readily pull apart at the joints, and both fertile and sterile stems look alike.

The water horsetail is most often confused with the marsh horsetail E. palustre, which has rougher stems with fewer (4–8) stem ridges with a smaller hollow in the stem centre, and longer spore cones 2–4 cm (0.8–1.6 in) long.

== Reproduction ==
The water horsetail reproduces both by spores and vegetatively by rhizomes. It primarily reproduces by vegetative means, with the majority of shoots arising from rhizomes. Spores are produced in sporangia in blunt-tipped cones at the tips of some stems. The spore cones are yellowish-green, 1 inch (2.5 cm) long.

== Distribution and habitat ==
The water horsetail ranges throughout the temperate Northern Hemisphere, from Eurasia south to central Spain, Italy, the Caucasus, China, Korea and Japan, and in North America from the Aleutian Islands to Newfoundland, south to Oregon, Idaho, northwest Montana, northeast Wyoming, West Virginia and Virginia.

It commonly grows in dense colonies along freshwater shorelines or in shallow water in ponds, swamps, ditches, and other sluggish or still waters with mud bottoms.

This horsetail is sometimes seen as an invasive species because it is very hardy and tends to overwhelm other garden plants unless it is contained. When planting, it is best to plant them with the rhizome in a container.

== Uses ==
=== Domestic ===
The water horsetail has historically been used by both Europeans and Native Americans for scouring, sanding, and filing because of the high silica content in the stems.

Early spring shoots were eaten. Poorer Roman classes at times ate them as a vegetable, despite not being very palatable or nutritious.

=== Medical and agricultural ===
Medically it was used by the ancient Greeks and Romans to stop bleeding and treat kidney ailments, ulcers, and tuberculosis, and by the ancient Chinese to treat superficial visual obstructions.

According to Carl Linnaeus, reindeer, which refuse ordinary hay, will eat this horsetail, which is juicy, and that it is cut as fodder in the north of Sweden for cows, with a view to increasing their milk yield, but that horses will not touch it. It has also been used as a feed for livestock in Finland and is considered valuable, even better than many cultivated hays.

Horsetails absorb heavy metals from the soil, and are often used in bioassays for metals.

== Taxonomy ==
Linnaeus was the first to describe water horsetail with the binomial Equisetum sylvaticum in his Species Plantarum of 1753. In the same work, he also described the unbranched form of the plant as a separate species, E. limosum.
