= Equicalastrobus =

Equicalastrobus Temporal range: Carnian, ~237–227.3 Ma

Scientific classification
- Kingdom: Plantae
- Clade: Tracheophytes
- Division: Polypodiophyta
- Class: Polypodiopsida
- Subclass: Equisetidae
- Order: Equisetales
- Family: Equisetaceae
- Genus: †Equicalastrobus; Grauvogel-Stamm and Ash
- Species: †E. chinleana

Binomial name
- †Equicalastrobus chinleana (Daugherty) Grauvogel-Stamm and Ash

Extinct genus of equisetalean plants

Equicalastrobus is an extinct genus of plant related to horsetails from the late Carnian. It is known only from cones found in the Chinle Formation. It was initially described as part of the genus Lycostrobus before being reassigned to the genus Equicalastrobus. It may represent an intermediate stage between Calamites and Equisetum.
