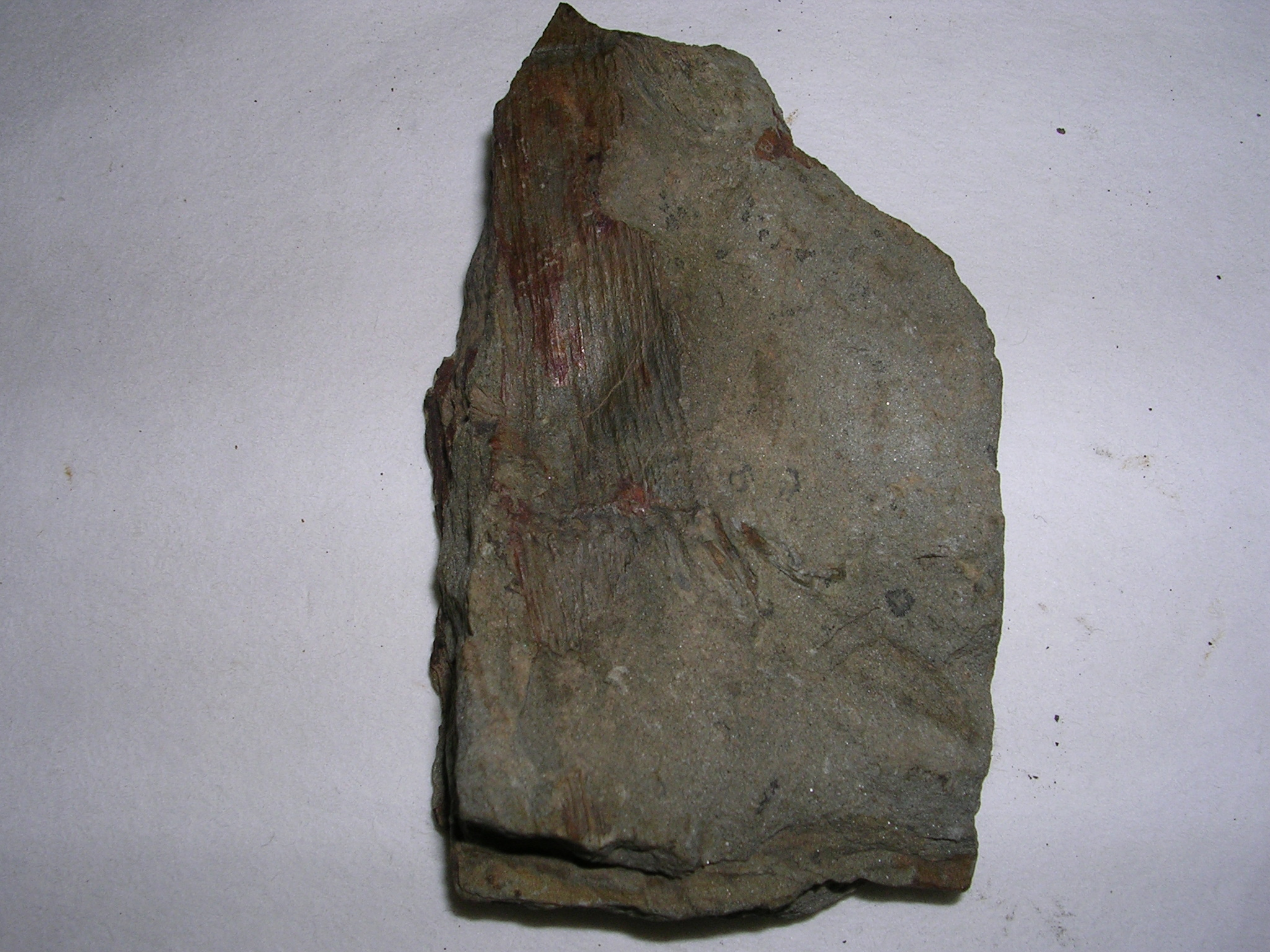
- Archaeocalamites

Scientific classification
- Kingdom: Plantae
- Clade: Tracheophytes
- Division: Polypodiophyta
- Class: Polypodiopsida
- Subclass: Equisetidae
- Order: Equisetales
- Family: †Archaeocalamitaceae; Koidz.

Genera
- †Archaeocalamites; †Paragiridia; †Radiatus; †Scrobiculatus

= Archaeocalamitaceae =

Archaeocalamitaceae Temporal range: Middle Devonian–Lower Permian

Paleozoic plant family

Archaeocalamitaceae is a family of extinct sphenopsids related to horsetails. Archaeocalamite fossils have been found in Siberia, Poland, and Brazil. The fossils date to the Middle Devonian-Carboniferous, lower Carboniferous (Dinantian), and the lower Permian respectively. Given the distance of the fossil discoveries, archaeocalamites may have had a subcosmopolitan distribution.

== Taxonomy ==
Possible relationships archaeocalamites has with other sphenopids is shown below.

- - ?†Ibyka
  - - †Pseudobornia ursina
    - - †Sphenophyllales
      - - †Archaeocalamitaceae
        - - †Calamitaceae
          - Equisetaceae
