= Phyllothecaceae =

Phyllothecaceae Temporal range: Permian

Scientific classification
- Kingdom: Plantae
- Clade: Tracheophytes
- Division: Polypodiophyta
- Class: Polypodiopsida
- Subclass: Equisetidae
- Order: Equisetales
- Family: †Phyllothecaceae; Brongniart (1828)

Genus
- Phyllotheca

Extinct family of ferns

The prehistoric family Phyllothecaceae, of the plant order Equisetales, was erected in 1828, when Brongniart described the type species Phyllotheca australis coming from Hawkesbury River, Australia.

It existed during the Permian Period.
