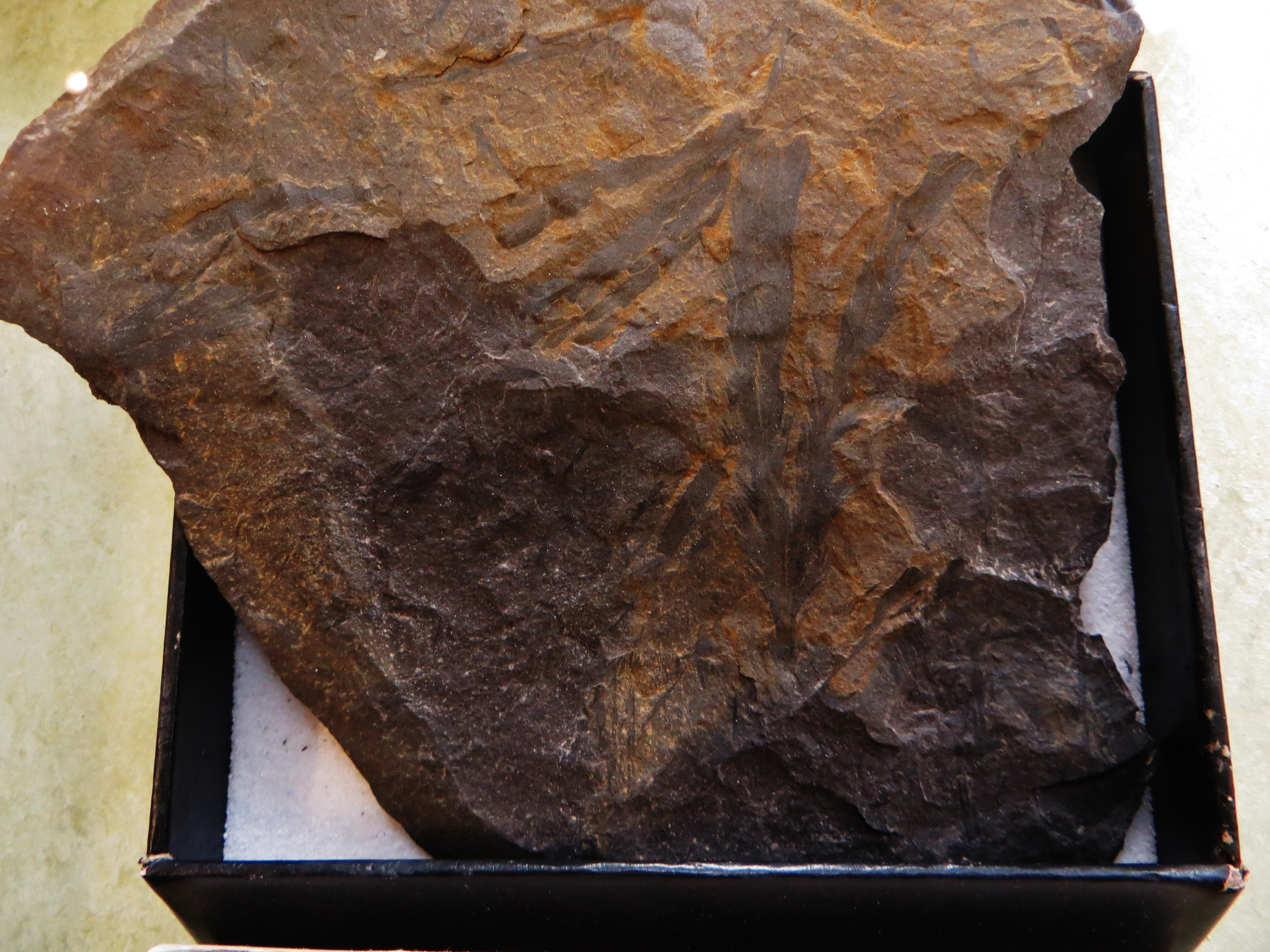
- Pseudobornia ursina

Scientific classification
- Kingdom: Plantae
- Clade: Tracheophytes
- Division: Polypodiophyta
- Class: Polypodiopsida
- Subclass: Equisetidae
- Order: †Pseudoborniales
- Genus: †Pseudobornia; Nathorst.
- Species: †P. ursina

Binomial name
- †Pseudobornia ursina Nathorst.

= Pseudobornia =

Pseudobornia Temporal range: Late Devonian

Extinct genus of ferns

Pseudobornia is a genus of plants identified only from the Upper Devonian. It contains a single species Pseudobornia ursina, and is the earliest fossil assigned with certainty to the Equisetopsida.

The first fossils of Pseudobornia were collected by Johan Gunnar Andersson on Bear Island in the 1890s. Hans-Joachim Schweitzer, a paleobotanist, was the first to interpret the fossils as belonging to a large tree, based on additional fossils identified in Alaska in the 1960s.

The probable relationships within Equisetidae are shown in the cladogram below. The position where would be Ibyka has been added.

- - †Ibyka(?)
  - - †Pseudobornia ursina
    - - †Sphenophyllales
      - - †Archaeocalamitaceae
        - - †Calamitaceae
          - - Equisetaceae
