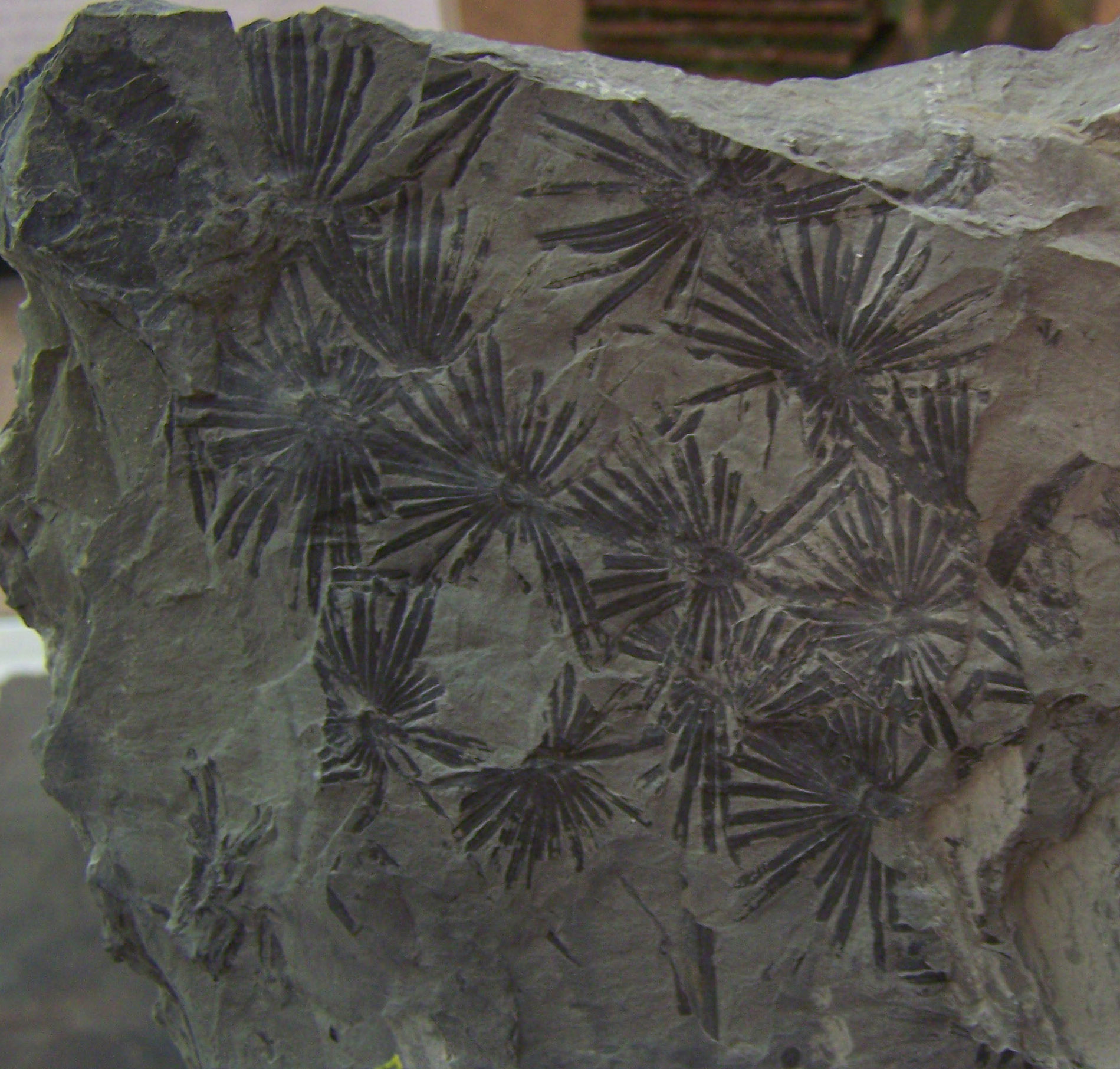
- Annularia stellata

Scientific classification
- Kingdom: Plantae
- Clade: Tracheophytes
- Division: Polypodiophyta
- Class: Polypodiopsida
- Subclass: Equisetidae
- Order: Equisetales
- Family: †Calamitaceae
- Genus: †Annularia; Sternberg (1821)

= Annularia =

Annularia Temporal range: Carboniferous

Form taxon of extinct plants in the family Calamitaceae

Annularia is a form taxon, applied to fossil foliage belonging to extinct plants of the genus Calamites in the order Equisetales.

== Description ==
Annularia is a form taxon name given to leaves of Calamites. In that species, the leaves formed radiating leaf whorls at each stem node, in a similar way to the branches of Equisetum, an extant genus of horsetails. Annularia leaves are arranged in whorls of between 8 and 13 leaves. The leaf shape is quite variable, being oval in Annularia sphenophylloides and linear to lanceolate in Annularia radiata, but they are always flat and of varying lengths.

Calamites were arborescent and grew to a height of 32 feet (9.8 meters).

== Fossil records ==
Fossils of this genus have been discovered in the Permian strata of Russia and in the Carboniferous (around 360 to 300 million years ago) strata of the United States, Canada, China and Europe.

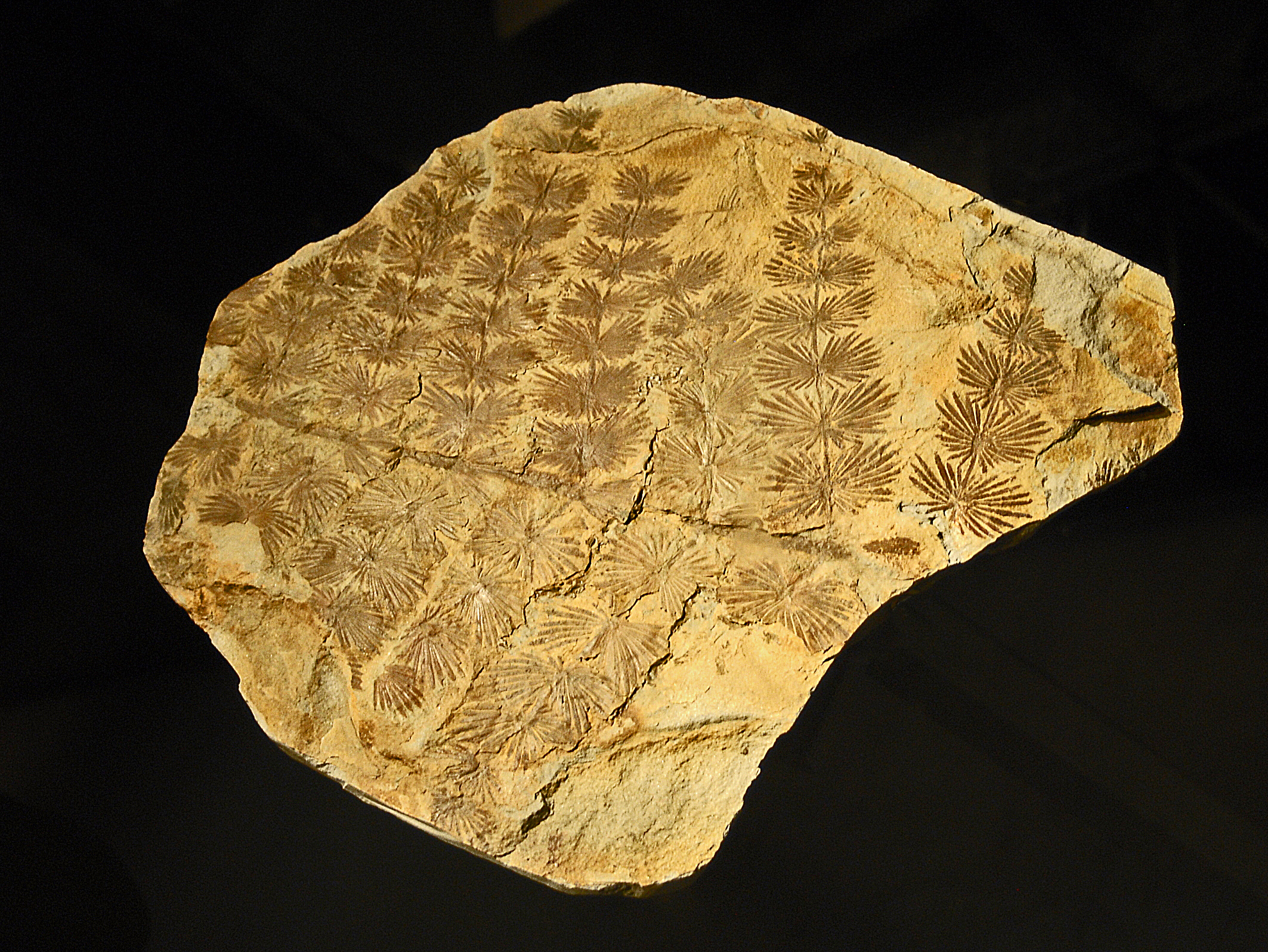
Specimen of Annularia stellata from Italy on display at the Museo Civico di Storia Naturale di Milano

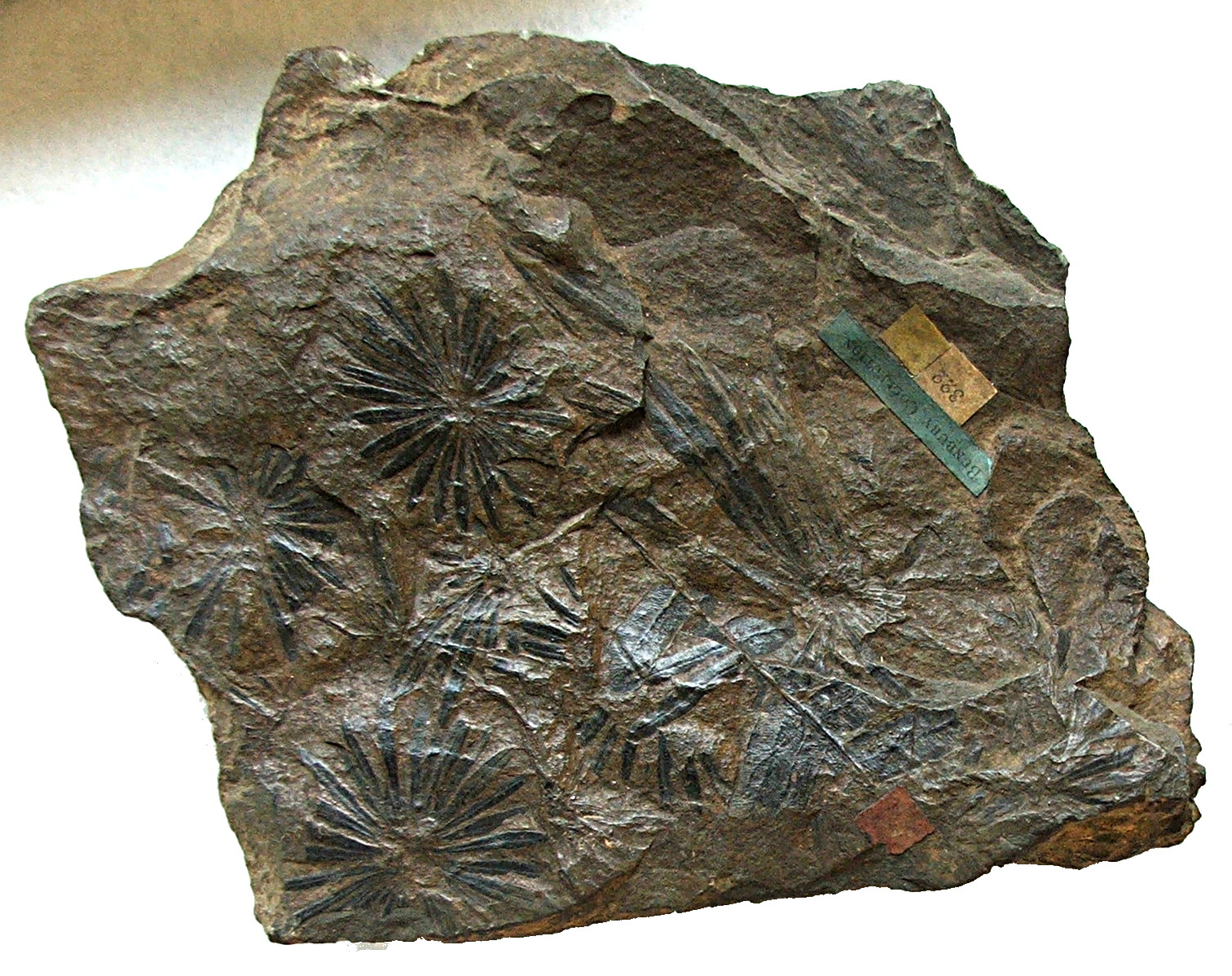
The foliage of Calamites

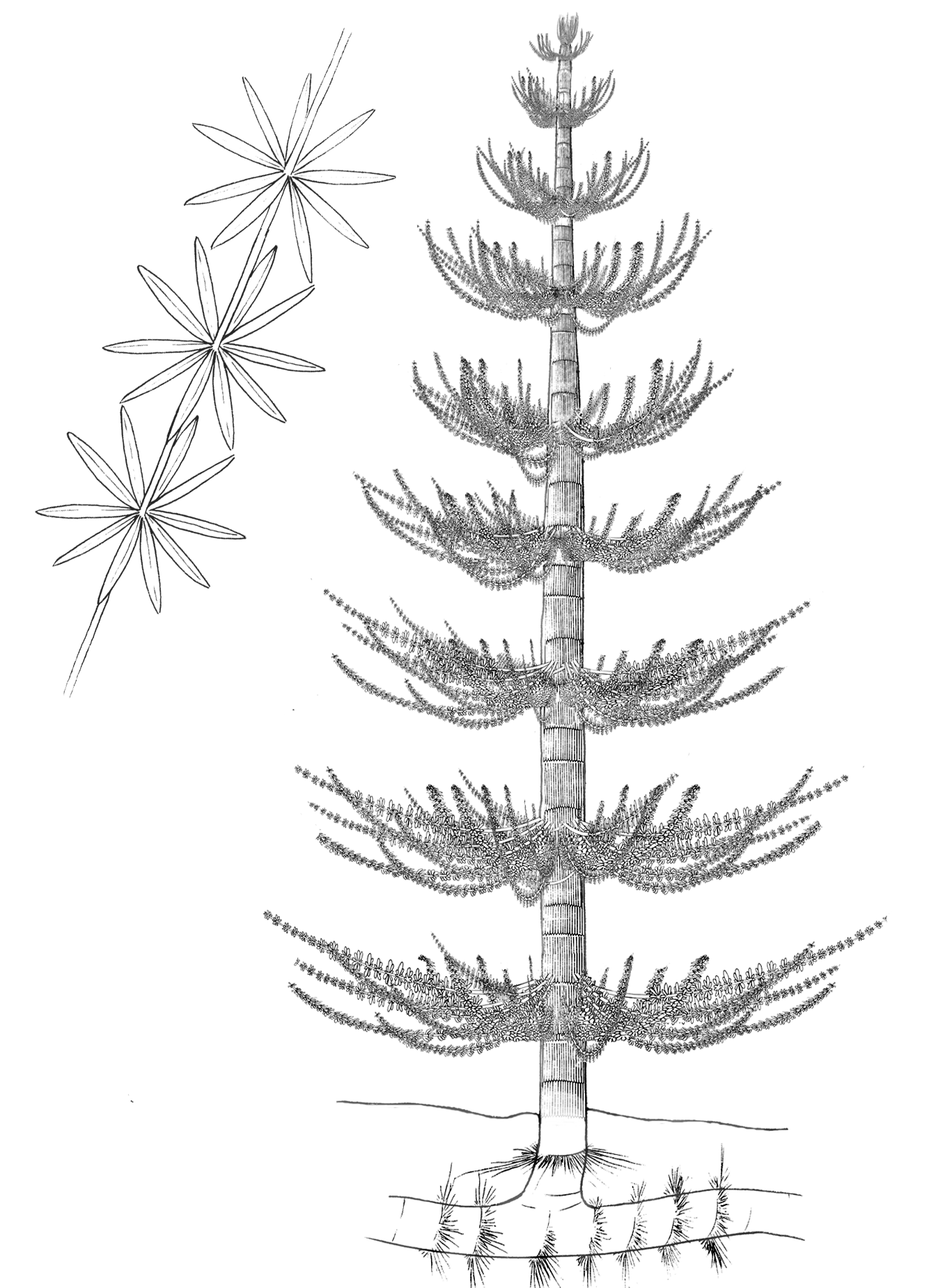
Calamites reconstruction

== See also ==
- Coal forest
