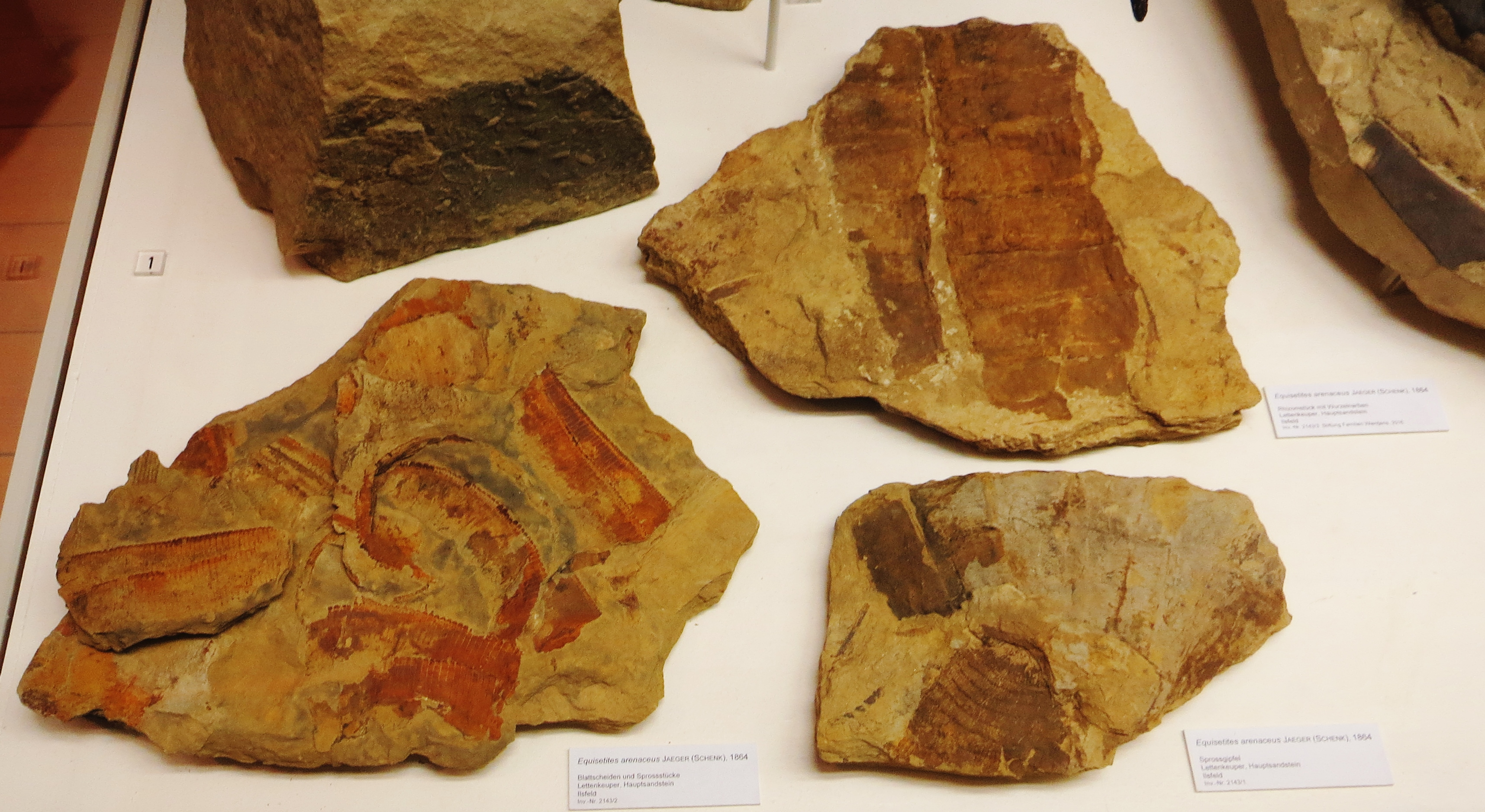
- Specimens of E. arenaceus

Scientific classification
- Kingdom: Plantae
- Clade: Tracheophytes
- Division: Polypodiophyta
- Class: Polypodiopsida
- Subclass: Equisetidae
- Order: Equisetales
- Family: Equisetaceae
- Genus: †Equisetites; Sternberg, 1833

Type species
- †Equisetites muensteri Sternberg, 1833

Other species
- †E. aequecaliginosus Weber, 2005; †E. angarensis Gutova et al., 1969; †E. arenaceus von Jaeger, 1864; †E. asiaticus Gutova et al., 1969; †E. carbonarium (Koenig, 1827 [originally Oncylogonatum]); †E. conicus Sternberg, 1833; †E. ectypus Ilyina, 1964; †E. elegans Ilyina et al., 1966; †E. ferganensis Gutova et al., 1969; †E. filus Xu, 2003; †E. glaber Kara-Murza, 1960; †E. glaburus Kara-Murza, 1960; †E. gracilis Marcinkiewicz, Orlowska & Rogalska, 1960; †E. hemingwayi Kidston, 1901; †E. hojedkii Ameri, Khalilizade & Zamani, 2014; †E. inoratus Gutova et al., 1964 and Ilyina, 1964; †E. irregularii Ameri, Khalilizade & Zamani, 2014; †E. latissimus Verbitskaya, 1962; †E. lyelli Allen et al., 1991; †E. keuperina Morton, 1863; †Equishetites langevaginattis Wu, 2008; †E. lateralis Gnaedinger, Villalva & Zavattieri, 2023; †E. magnus Gutova et al., 1964; †E. microrugosus Verbitskaya, 1962; †E. meugeoti (Brongniart, 1828); †E. nathorsti Klaus, 1960; †E. obbatus Verbitskaya, 1962; †E. pabdanaii Ameri, Khalilizade & Zamani, 2014; †E. palustriformis Gutova et al., 1964; †E. platyodon Potonie, 1962; †E. punctatus Gutova et al., 1964; †E. pusillus Villar de Seoane, 2005; †E. sparseii Ameri, Khalilizade & Zamani, 2014; †E. spatulatus Zeiller, 1895; †E. rotundiformis Prosviryakova, 1966; †E. rotundum Kara-Murza, 1958; †E. rotundus Kara-Murza, 1960; †E. subteres Verbitskaya, 1962; †E. suecicus Balme, 1995; †E. variabilis Vinogradova, 1971

Synonyms
- Bajera Sternberg, 1825; Equisetites mougeotii Wills, 1910; E. arenaceous Schenk emend. Kelber & van Konijnenburg-van Cittert, 1998; Equisetum laterale Gould, 1968; Oncylogonatum Koenig, 1827

= Equisetites =

Equisetites Temporal range: Westphalian–Maastrichtian 319.0–66.043 Ma

Extinct genus of vascular plants in the family Equisetaceae

Equisetites is an extinct genus of vascular plants within Equisetaceae, a family of vascular plants that reproduce by spores rather than seeds. The genus was named by Sternberg (1833) and contains at least 40 named species and two unnamed species, with the earliest known species being E. hemingwayi from the Westphalian of Yorkshire, England, though the affinity of this genus to modern Equistaceae is uncertain.

== Systematics ==
Equisetites is a "wastebin taxon" uniting all sorts of large horsetails from the Mesozoic; it is almost certainly paraphyletic and would probably warrant being subsumed in Equisetum. But while some of the species placed there are likely to be ancestral to the modern horsetails, there have been reports of secondary growth in other Equisetites, and these probably represent a distinct and now-extinct horsetail lineage. Equicalastrobus is the name given to fossil horsetail strobili, which probably mostly or completely belong to the (sterile) plants placed in Equisetites.

== Ecology ==
Equisetites likely reproduced via the spore-bearing strobili which have been preserved in some specimens, and has also been proposed to be capable of asexual Vegetative reproduction via shed twigs and adventurous roots.
