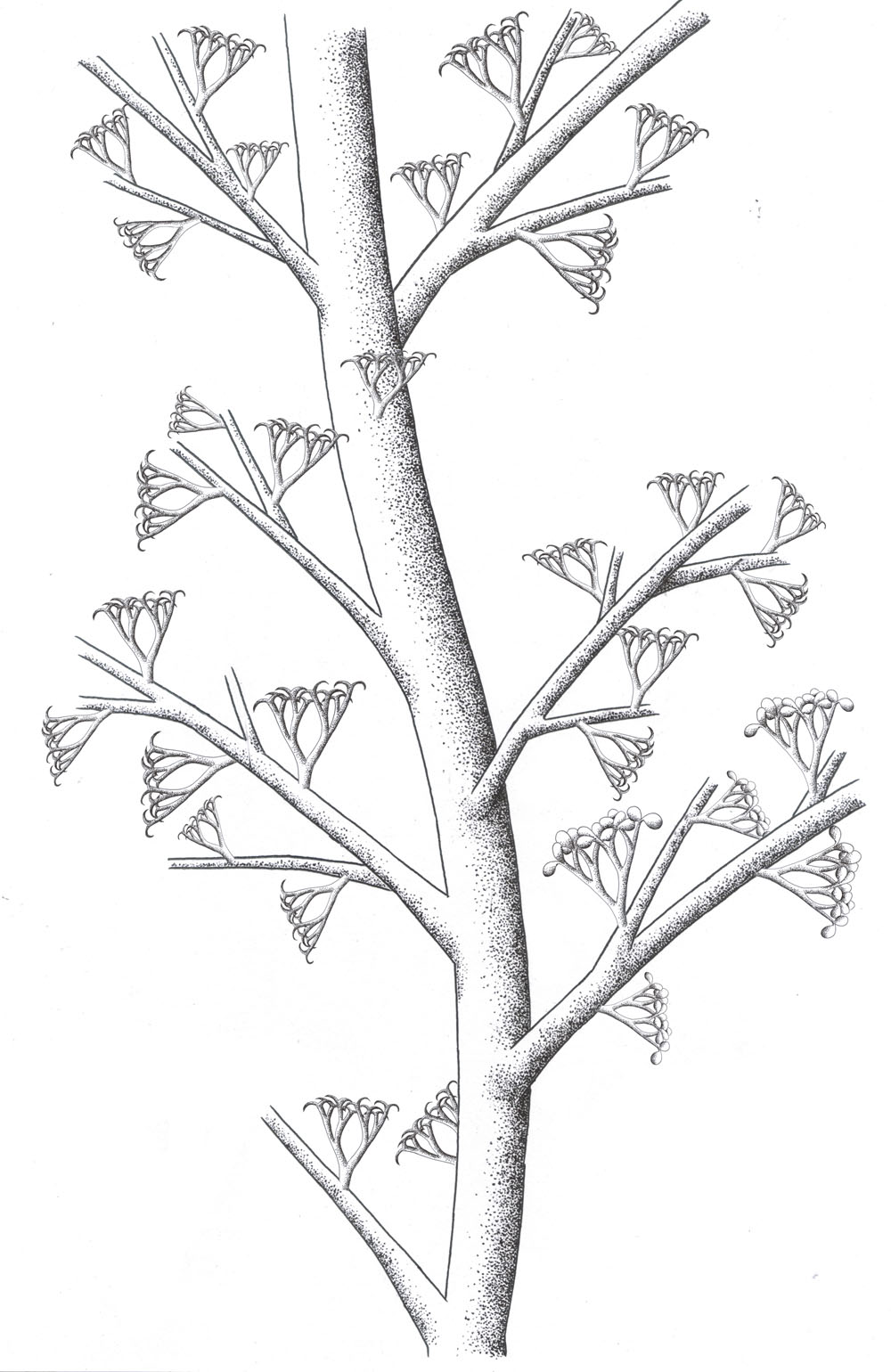
- Reconstruction of the external anatomy of the Devonian plant Ibyka amphikoma Skog & Banks, from the original description

Scientific classification
- Kingdom: Plantae
- Clade: Tracheophytes
- Division: Pteridophyta (?)
- Class: †Cladoxylopsida
- Order: †Iridopteridales

Genera
- †Arachnoxylon †Compsocradus †Iridopteris †Metacladophyton †Ibyka †Serripteris †Asteropteris †Anapaulia †Keraphyton †Rotoxylon

= Iridopteridales =

Iridopteridales Temporal range: Middle Devonian–Upper Devonian

Extinct order of ferns

Iridopteridales is an order of the extinct cladoxylopsids. It contains the genus Ibyka which is a possible ancestor of the horsetails.
