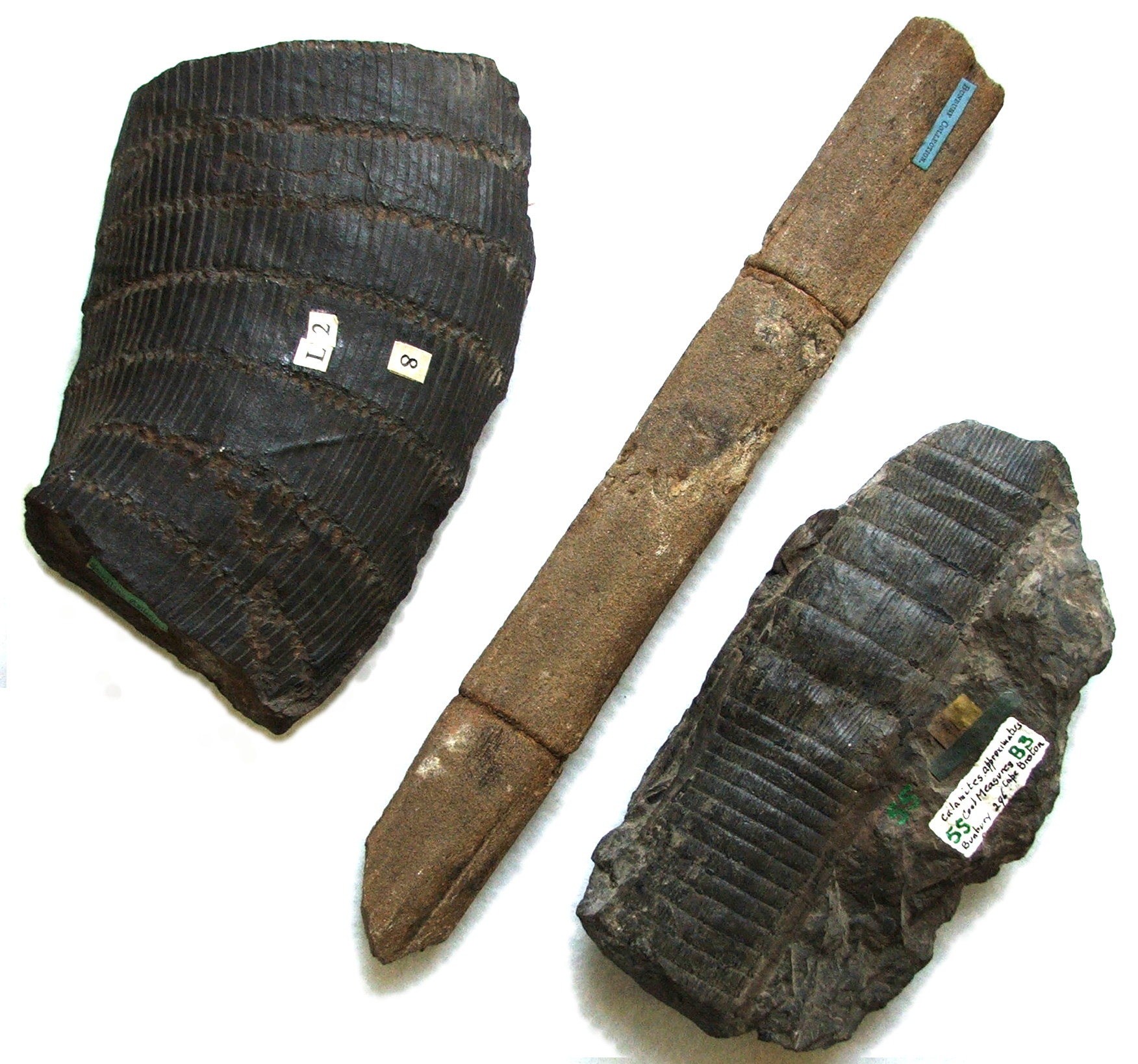
- A range of Calamites specimens, illustrating the different appearance of fossils preserved under different taphonomic modes

Scientific classification
- Kingdom: Plantae
- Clade: Tracheophytes
- Division: Polypodiophyta
- Class: Polypodiopsida
- Subclass: Equisetidae
- Order: Equisetales
- Family: †Calamitaceae
- Genus: †Calamites

Species
- Calamites carinatus Calamites cistii Calamites cruciatus Calamites goeppertii Calamites multiramis Calamites ramosus Calamites rectangulus Calamites sachsei Calamites schuetzeiformis Calamites schulzii Calamites sickowii Calamites suckowi Calamites undulatus

= Calamites =

Calamites Temporal range: Carboniferous–Early Permian

Extinct genus of vascular plants

Calamites is a genus of extinct arborescent (tree-like) horsetails to which the modern horsetails (genus Equisetum) are closely related. Unlike their herbaceous modern cousins, these plants were medium-sized trees, growing to heights of 30–50 meters (98–164 ft). They were components of the understories of coal swamps of the Carboniferous Period (around 360 to 300 million years ago).

== Taxonomy ==
A number of organ taxa have been identified as part of a united organism, which has inherited the name Calamites in popular culture. Calamites correctly refers only to casts of the stem of Carboniferous/Permian sphenophytes, and as such is a form genus of little taxonomic value. There are two forms of casts, which can give mistaken impressions of the organisms. The most common is an internal cast of the hollow (or pith-filled) void in the centre of the trunk. This can cause some confusion: firstly, a fossil was probably surrounded with 4–5 times its width in (unpreserved) vascular tissue, so the organisms were much wider than the internal casts preserved. Further, the fossil gets narrower as it attaches to a rhizoid, a place where one would expect there to be the highest concentration of vascular tissue (as this is where the peak transport occurs). However, because the fossil is a cast, the narrowing in fact represents a constriction of the cavity, into which vascular tubes encroach as they widen.

Further organ genera belonging to sphenophytes include:

- Arthropitys (stems which are preserved in a mineralised form)
- Astromyelon (permineralised rhizomes, distinguished from Arthropitys by the absence of a carinal canal)
- Annularia and Asterophylites (form genera of leaf-whorls which are paraphyletic).

== Anatomy ==
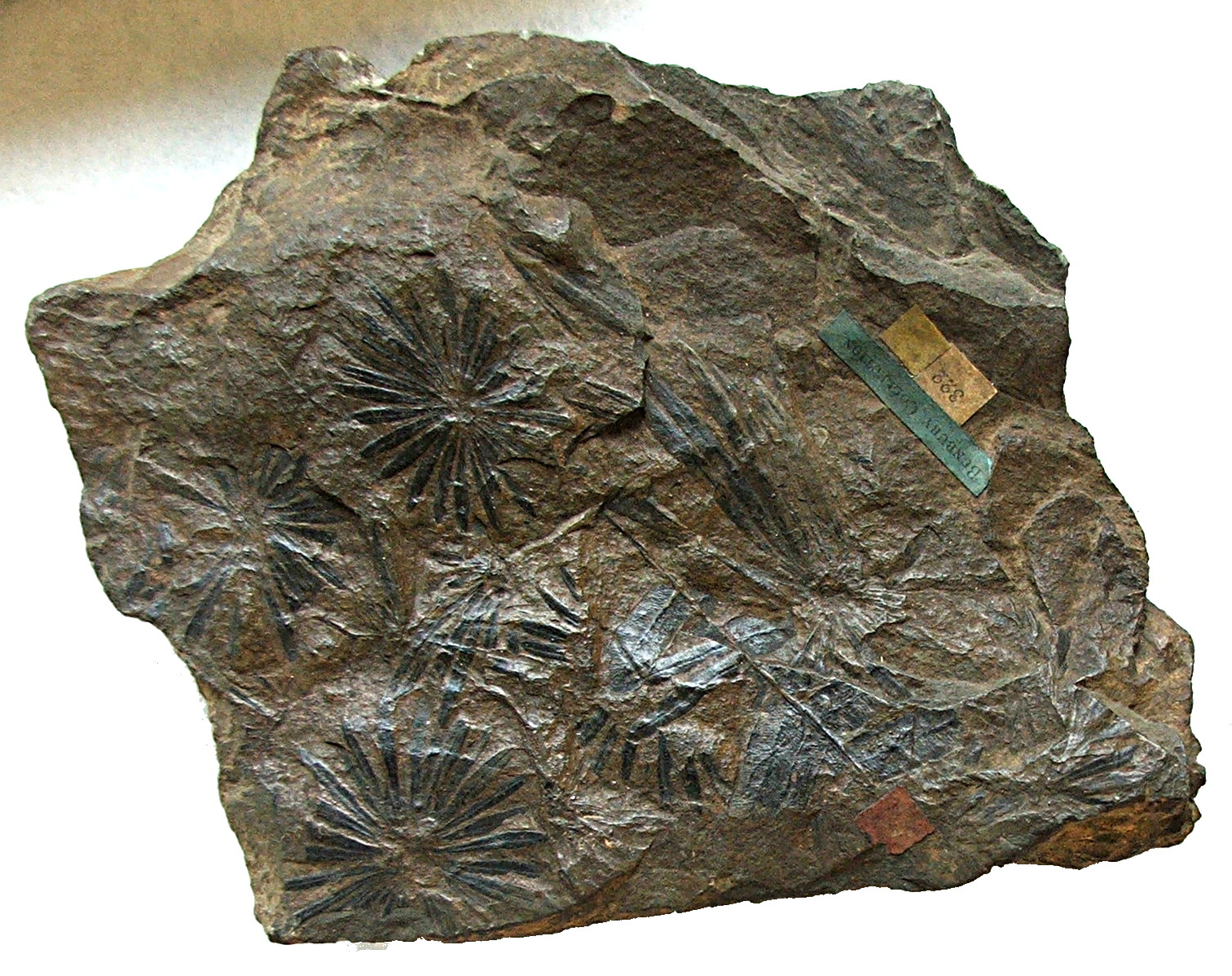
The foliage (Annularia) of Calamites

The trunks of Calamites had a distinctive segmented, bamboo-like appearance and vertical ribbing. The branches, leaves and cones were all borne in whorls. The leaves were needle-shaped, with up to 25 per whorl.

Their trunks produced secondary xylem, meaning they were made of wood. The vascular cambium of Calamites was unifacial, producing secondary xylem towards the stem center, but not secondary phloem.

The stems of modern horsetails are typically hollow or contain numerous elongated air-filled sacs. Calamites was similar in that its trunk and stems were hollow, like wooden tubes. When these trunks buckled and broke, they could fill with sediment. This is the reason pith casts of the inside of Calamites stems are so common as fossils.

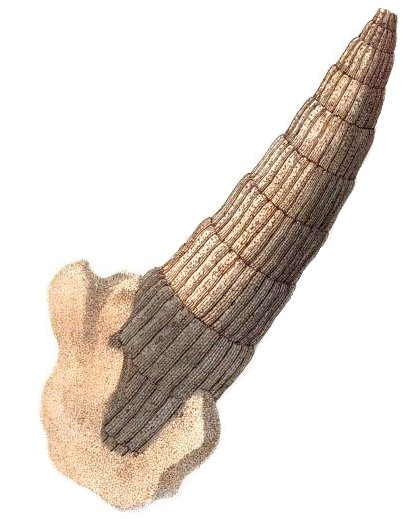
A diagram of a pith cast of Calamites

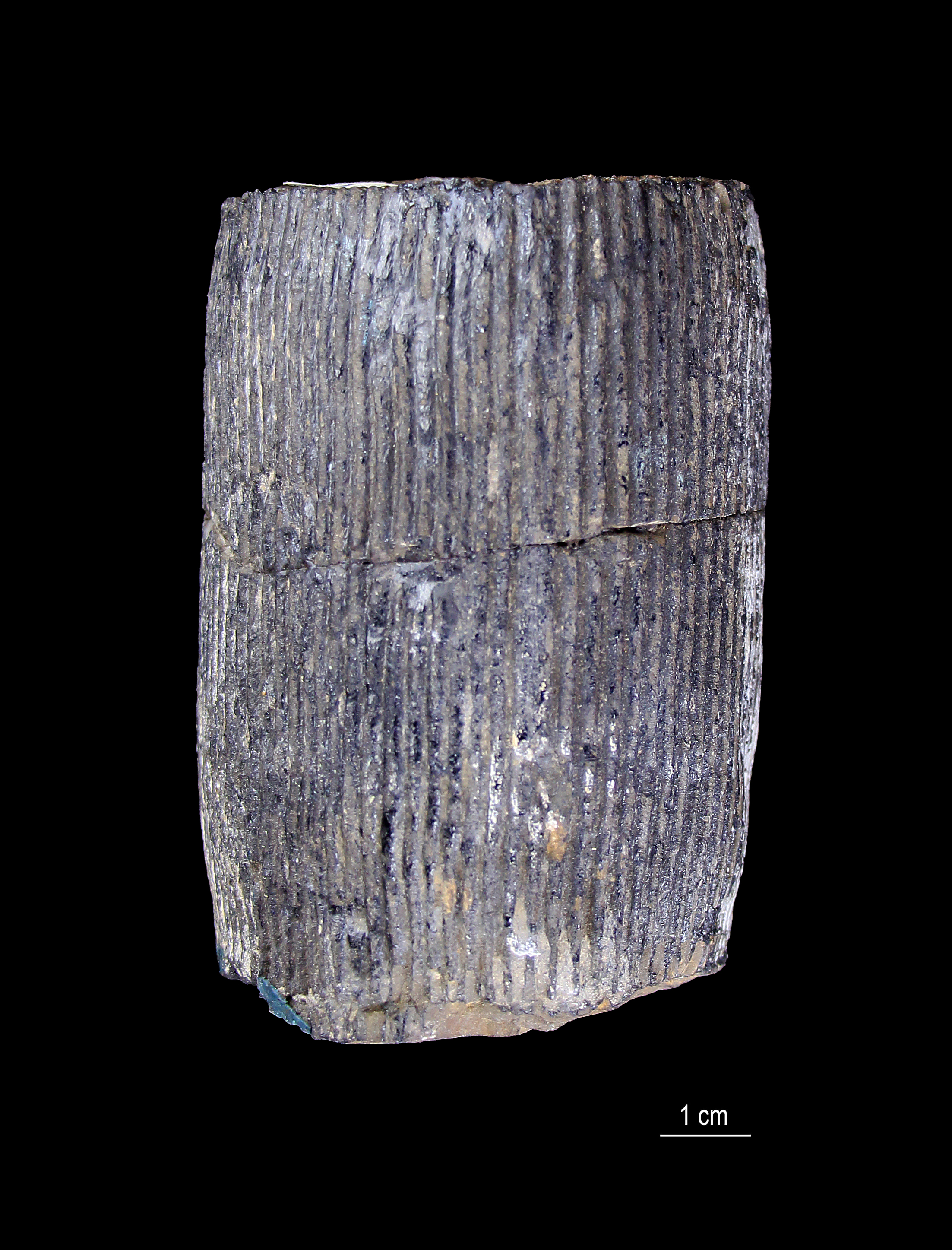
Calamites sp., Estonian Museum of Natural History

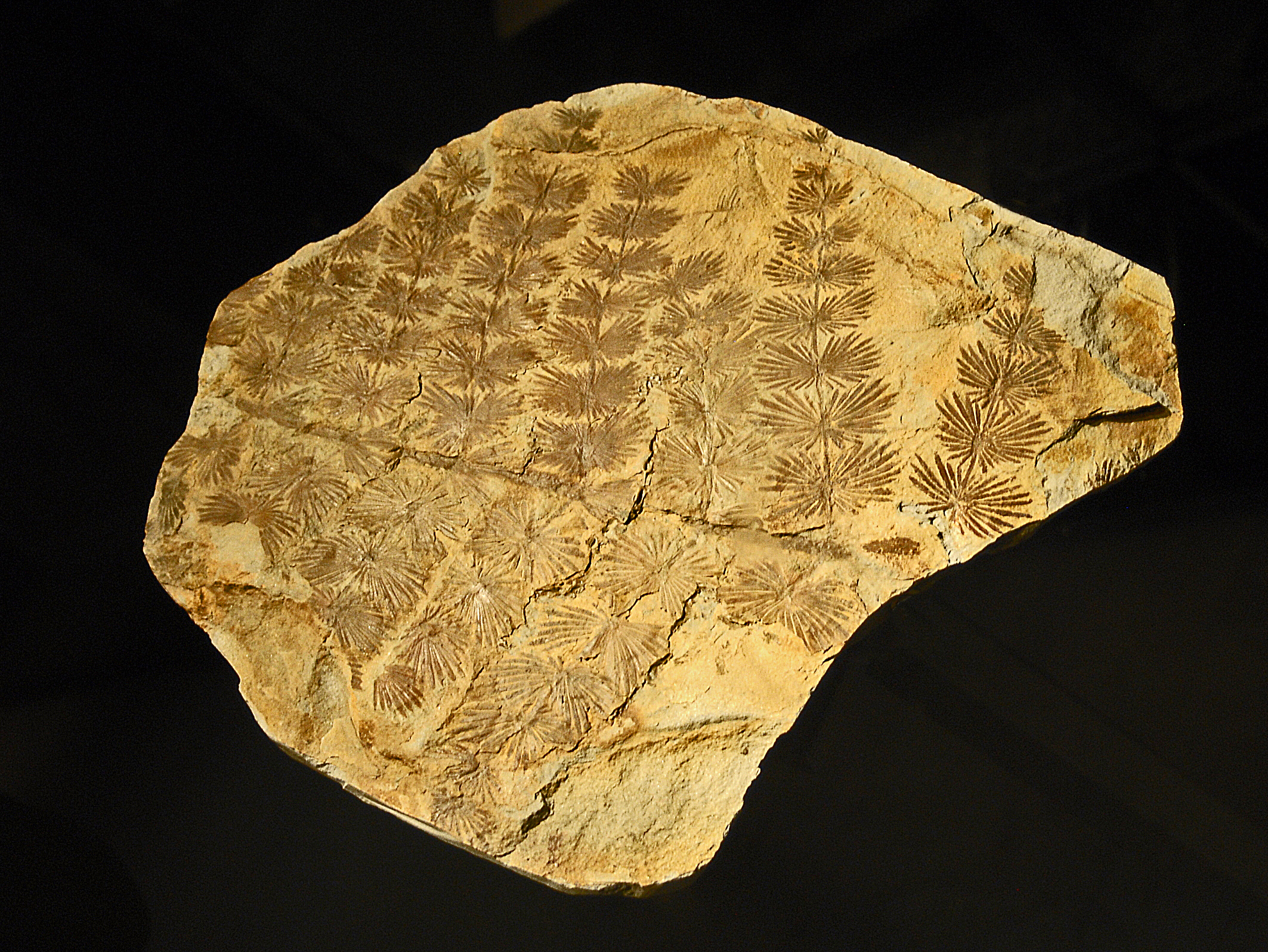
Specimen of Annularia stellata from Italy, Museo Civico di Storia Naturale di Milano

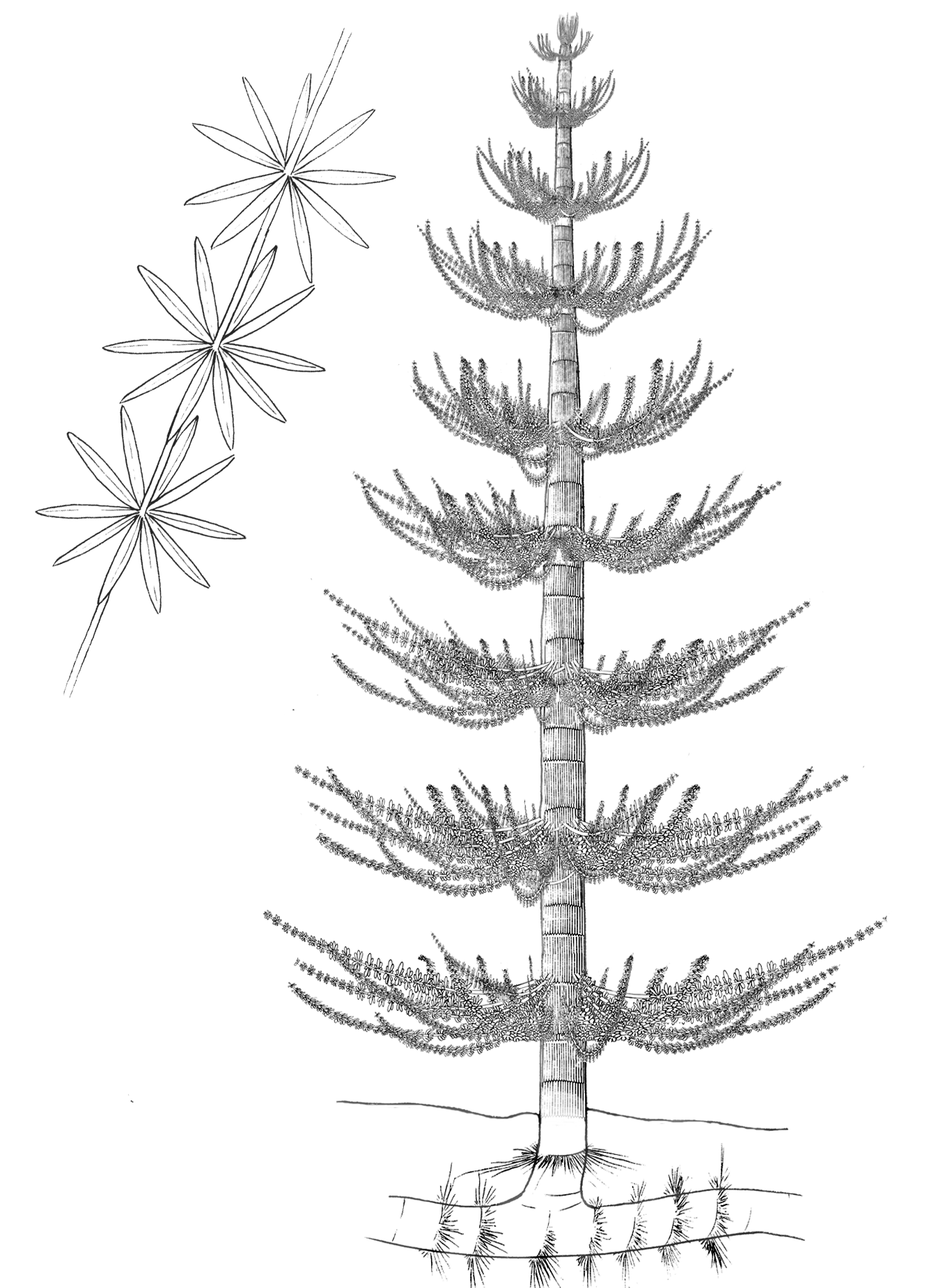
Reconstruction of a whole Calamites tree with Annularia

== Reproduction ==
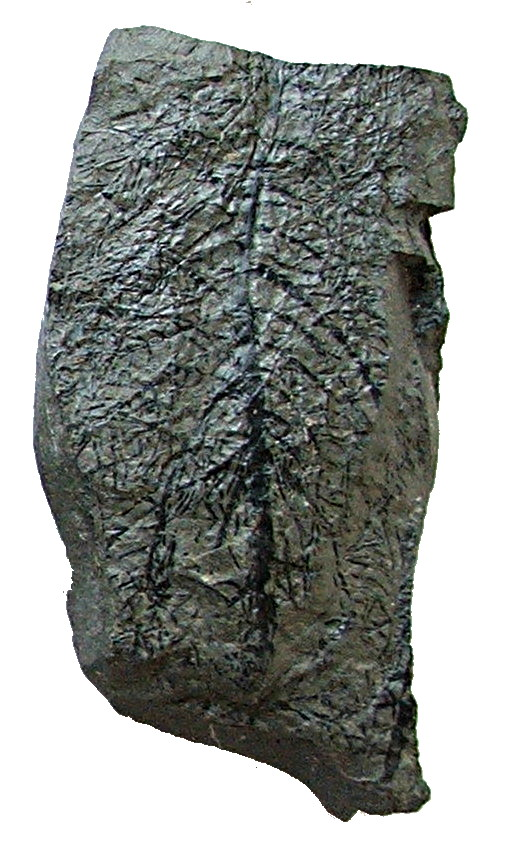
A Calamites rhizoid

Calamites reproduced by means of spores, which were produced in small sacs organized into cones. They are also known to have possessed massive underground rhizomes, which allowed for the production of clones of one tree. This is the only group of trees of their period known to have a clonal habit. This type of asexual reproduction would allow them to spread quickly into new territory, and help to anchor them firmly in the unstable ground along rivers and in newly deposited delta sediments. The rhizomes of Calamites look quite similar to the stems in most cases, but have nodes that get progressively closer together as they approach the apical area (the growth tip that spreads outward through the soil).

== Different forms ==
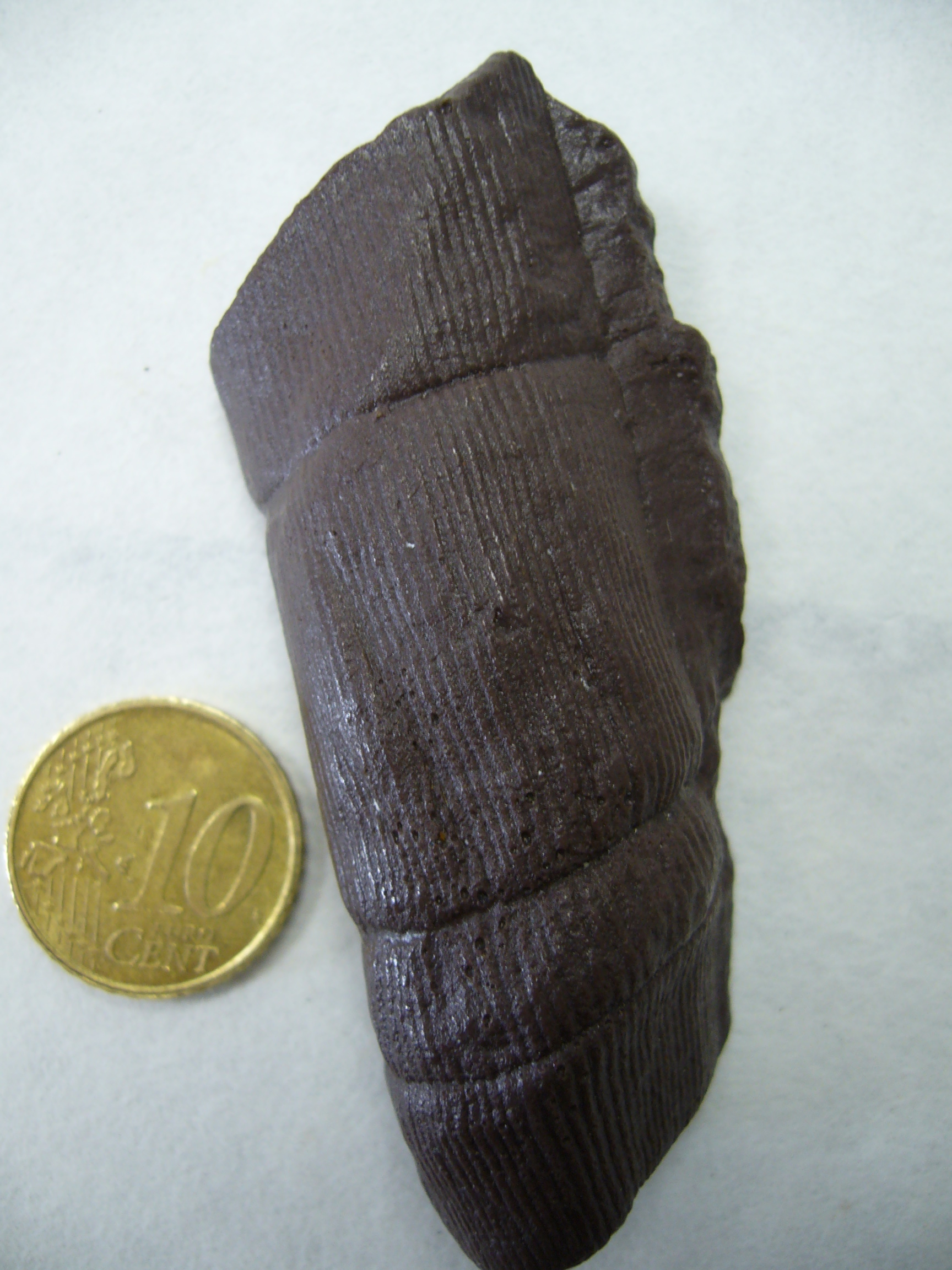
Replica of Calamites sp. (Carboniferous, Léon, Spain), in a laboratory of practices of the Faculty of Sciences of the University of Corunna.

Calamites come in a variety of different "form genera". One type, Calamites suckowi, is distinguishable from other Calamites forms by its prominent, swollen nodes and relatively wide-spaced longitudinal ribs. Another example, Calamites cisti, has much smaller nodes and the ribs are typically closer together.

In addition, the distance between successive node lines on a Calamites suckowi specimen is typically much wider than the diameter. In other forms like Calamites cisti, the opposite is true or the specimen is just slightly wider than the diameter.

However, the value of these form taxa is limited. The distance between nodes, for example, is highly variable, and an intercalary meristem means that this distance varied as the organisms grew.

== Extinction and classification ==
The genus Calamites is placed in the family Calamitaceae in the plant class Equisetopsida (formerly known as Sphenophyta) in the fern allies division Pteridophyta. The Calamitaceae finally became extinct in the early Permian, a time which also saw the origin and diversification of the herbaceous genus Equisetum, the only living sphenophyte genus.

== See also ==
- Archaeopteris
