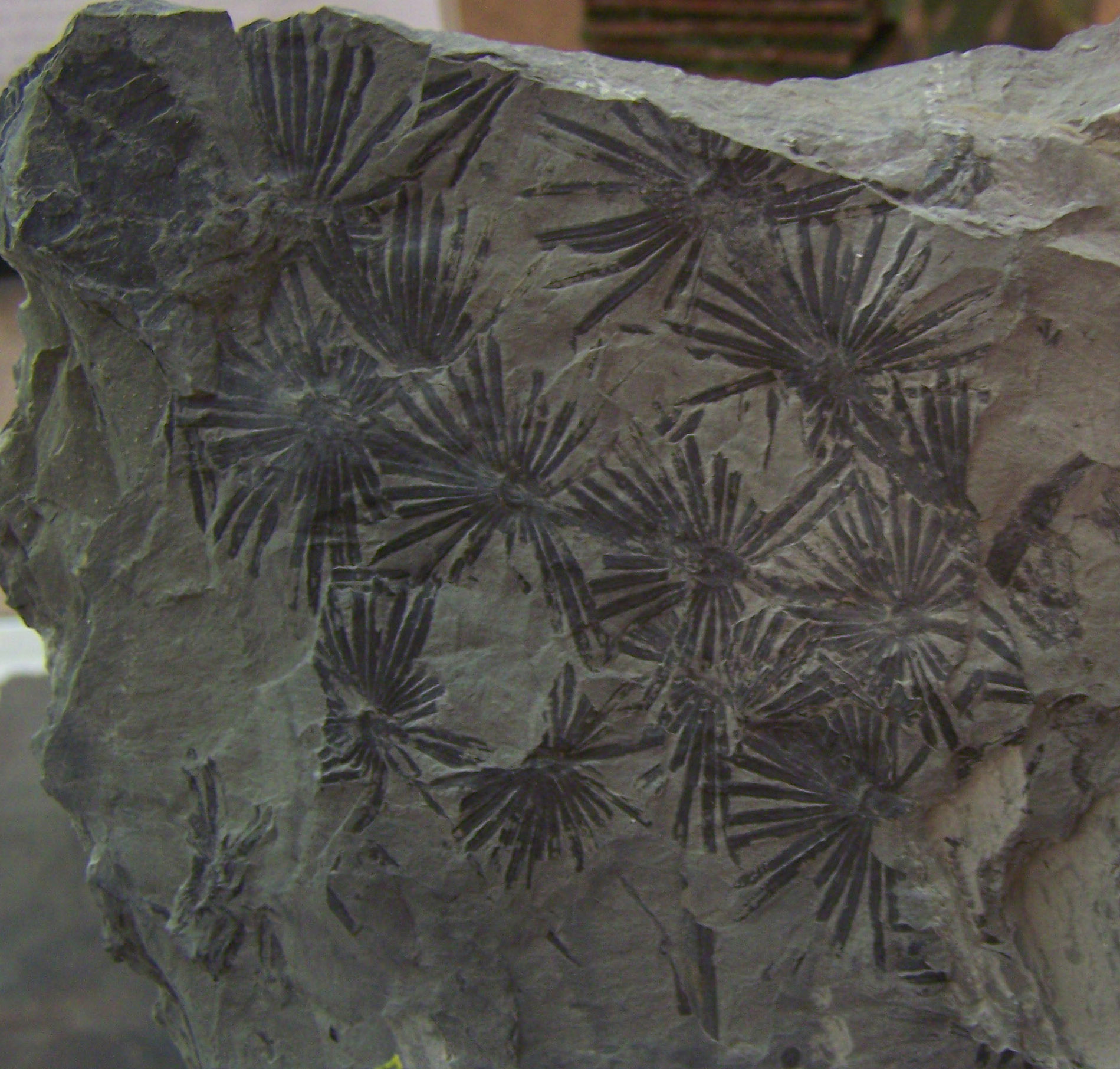
- Annularia stellata

Scientific classification
- Kingdom: Plantae
- Clade: Tracheophytes
- Division: Polypodiophyta
- Class: Polypodiopsida
- Subclass: Equisetidae
- Order: Equisetales
- Family: †Calamitaceae; Unger, 1840

Genera
- See text

= Calamitaceae =

Calamitaceae Temporal range: Carboniferous–Permian

Extinct family of horsetails

External image
- Reconstruction of the calamite Arthropitys Scale bar = 1 m

Calamitaceae is an extinct family of equisetalean plants related to the modern horsetails, known from the Carboniferous and Permian periods. Some members of this family like Arthropitys attained tree-like stature, with heights over 15 metres (49 ft) and a branching crown of stems from the upper trunk, with extensive underground rhizomes. They were largely found in wetland environments.

== Proposed genera and species of Calamitaceae ==
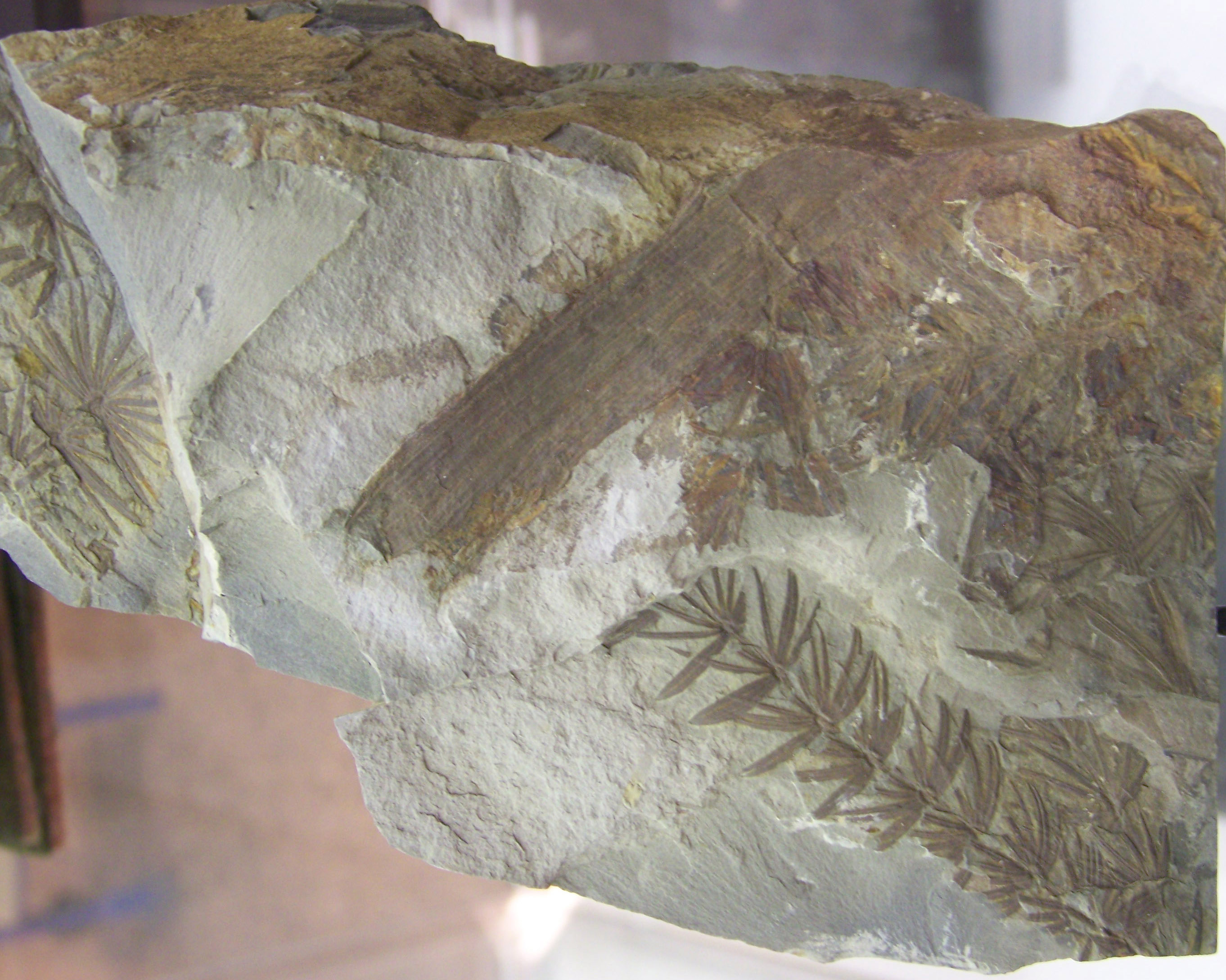
Asterophyllites equisetiformis

- Annularia.
  - A. stellata.
- Arthropitys.
- Asterophyllites (or incorrectly Asterophyllum).
- Astromyelon.

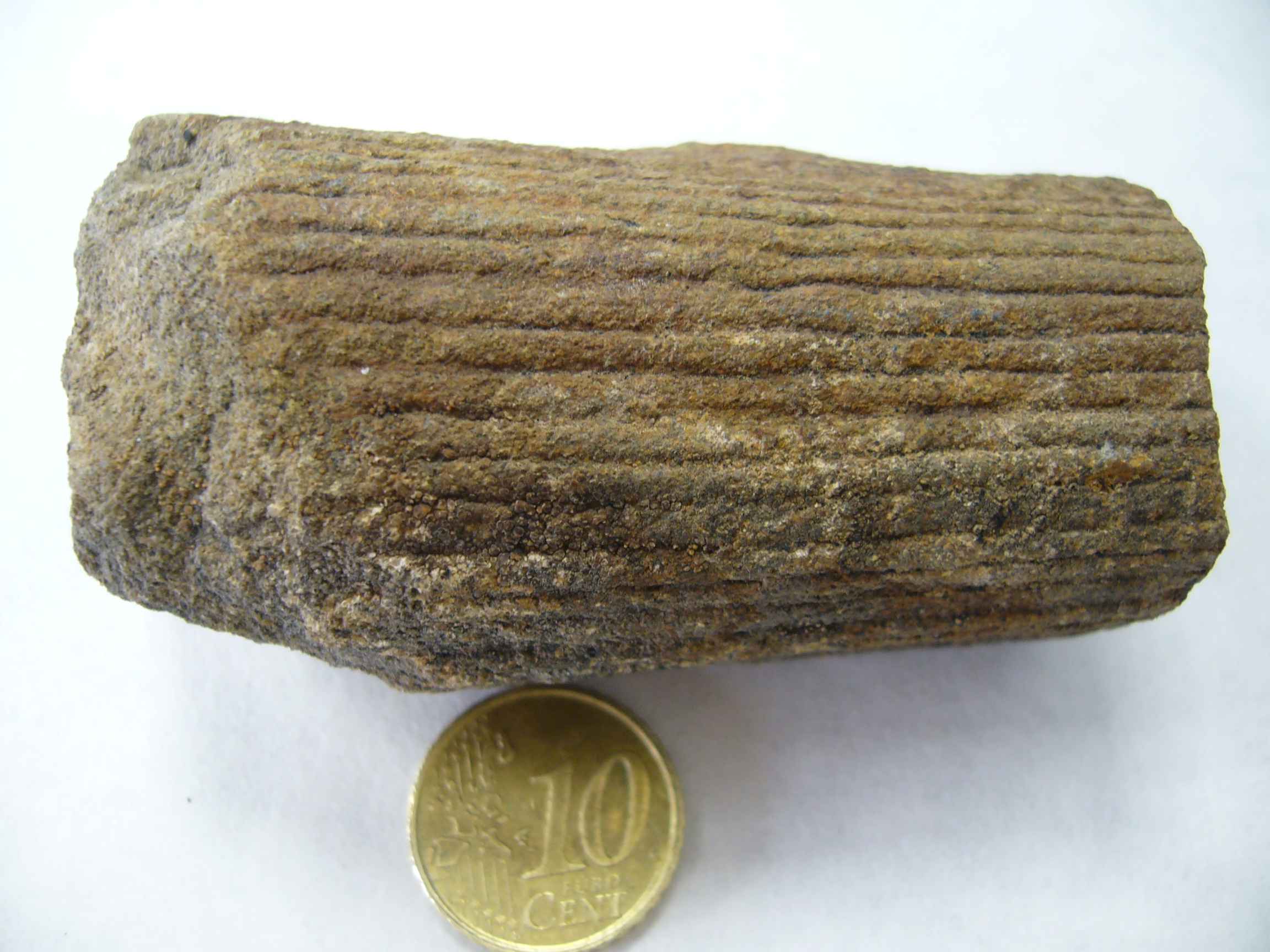
Calamites

- Calamites.
  - C. carinatus.
  - C. suckowi.
  - C. undulatus.
- Calamocarpon.
- Calamostachys.
  - C. binneyana.
- Cingularia.
- Mazostachys.
- Paleostachya.
