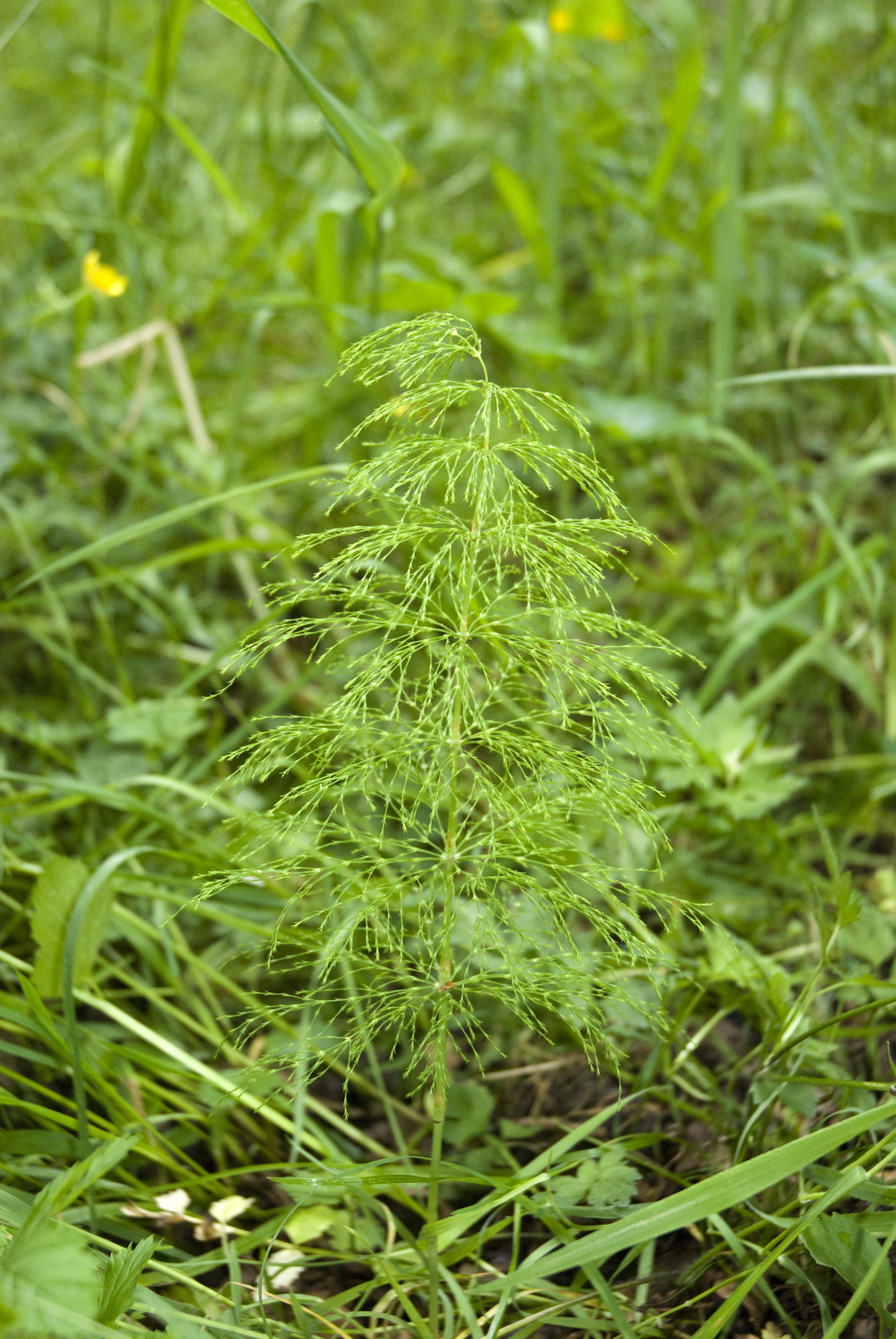
- Equisetum sylvaticum in France

Scientific classification
- Kingdom: Plantae
- Clade: Tracheophytes
- Division: Polypodiophyta
- Class: Polypodiopsida
- Subclass: Equisetidae
- Order: Equisetales; DC. ex Bercht. & J. Presl

Families
- †Archaeocalamitaceae; †Calamitaceae; Equisetaceae; †Phyllothecaceae; †Neocalamites; †Nododendron; †Schizoneura; †Spaciinodum

= Equisetales =

Equisetales Temporal range: Late Devonian – Present

Order of ferns

Equisetales is an order of subclass Equisetidae with only one living family, Equisetaceae, containing the genus Equisetum (horsetails), as well as a variety of extinct groups, including the tree-like Calamitaceae.

== Classification ==
In the molecular phylogenetic classification of Smith et al. in 2006, Equisetales, in its present circumscription, was held to be the sole member of class Equisetopsida. The linear sequence of Christenhusz et al. (2011), intended for compatibility with the classification of Chase and Reveal (2009) which placed all land plants in Equisetopsida, made it the sole member of subclass Equisetidae, equivalent to Smith's Equisetopsida. The placement of Equisetales in subclass Equisetidae has subsequently been followed in the classifications of Christenhusz and Chase (2014) and PPG I (2016).

The fossil record includes additional extinct species in Equisetaceae and the extinct families Calamitaceae, Archaeocalamitaceae and Phyllothecaceae.

Cladogram after Elgorriaga et al, 2018.

- Equisetales
  - Archaeocalamitaceae
    - Protocalamostachys
    - Peltotheca
  - - - - Paracalamitina
        - Cruciaetheca
      - Calamitaceae
    - - Neocalamites
      - Equisetaceae
        - Equisetites arenaceus
        - - Spaciinodum
          - Equisetum
