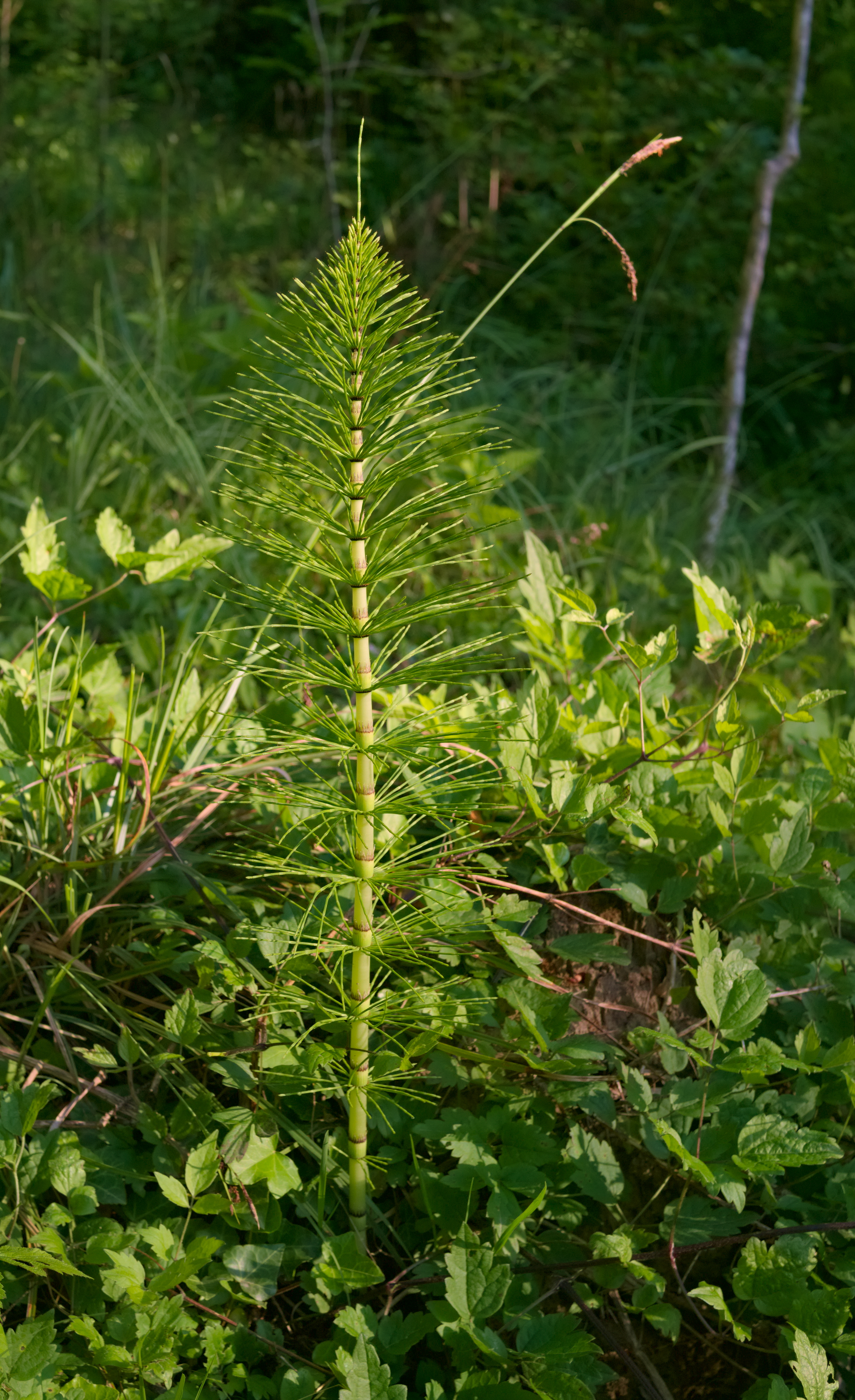
- Equisetum telmateia

Scientific classification
- Kingdom: Plantae
- Clade: Tracheophytes
- Division: Polypodiophyta
- Class: Polypodiopsida
- Subclass: Equisetidae; Warm.

Orders
- Equisetales; † Archaeocalamitaceae; † Calamitaceae; Equisetaceae; † Pseudoborniales; † Sphenophyllales

Synonyms
- See text.

= Equisetidae =

Equisetidae Temporal range: Late Devonian to Recent

Subclass of ferns

Equisetidae is one of the four subclasses of Polypodiopsida (ferns), a group of vascular plants with a fossil record going back to the Devonian. They are commonly known as horsetails. They typically grow in wet areas, with whorls of needle-like branches radiating at regular intervals from a single vertical stem.

The Equisetidae were formerly regarded as a separate division of spore plants and called Equisetophyta, Arthrophyta, Calamophyta or Sphenophyta. When treated as a class, the names Equisetopsida s.s. and Sphenopsida have also been used. They are now recognized as rather close relatives of the ferns (Polypodiopsida) of which they form a specialized lineage. However, the division between the horsetails and the other ferns is so ancient that many botanists, especially paleobotanists, still regard this group as fundamentally separate at the higher level. The only living genus is Equisetum.

== Description ==
The horsetails comprise photosynthesising, "segmented", hollow stems, sometimes filled with pith. At the junction ("node", see diagram) between each segment is a whorl of leaves. In the only extant genus Equisetum, these are small leaves (microphylls) with a singular vascular trace, fused into a sheath at each stem node. However, the leaves of Equisetum probably arose by the reduction of megaphylls, as evidenced by early fossil forms such as Sphenophyllum, in which the leaves are broad with branching veins.

The vascular bundles trifurcate at the nodes, with the central branch becoming the vein of a microphyll, and the other two moving left and right to merge with the new branches of their neighbours. The vascular system itself resembles that of the vascular plants' eustele, which evolved independently and convergently. Very rapid internode elongation results in the formation of a pith cavity and a ring of carinal canals formed by disruption of the primary xylem. Similar spaces, the vallecular canals are formed in the cortex. Due to the softer nature of the phloem, these are very rarely seen in fossil instances. In the Calamitaceae, secondary xylem (but not secondary phloem) was secreted as the cambium grew outwards, producing a woody stem, and allowing the plants to grow as high as 10m. All extant species of Equisetum are herbaceous, and have lost the ability to produce secondary growth.

The underground parts of the plants consist of jointed rhizomes, from which roots and aerial axes emerge. The plants have intercalary meristems in each segment of the stem and rhizome that grow as the plant gets taller. This contrasts with most seed plants, which grow from an apical meristem - i.e. new growth comes only from growing tips (and widening of stems).

Horsetails bear cones (technically strobili, sing. strobilus) at the tips of some stems. These cones comprise spirally arranged sporangiophores, which bear sporangia at their edges, and in extant horsetails cover the spores externally - like sacs hanging from an umbrella, with its handle embedded in the axis of the cone. In extinct groups, further protection was afforded to the spores by the presence of whorls of bracts - big pointed microphylls protruding from the cone.

The extant horsetails are homosporous, but extinct heterosporous species such as Calamostachys casheana appear in the fossil record. The sporangia open by lateral dehiscence to release the spores. The spores bear characteristic elaters, distinctive spring-like attachments which are hygroscopic: i.e. they change their configuration in the presence of water, helping the spores move and aiding their dispersal.

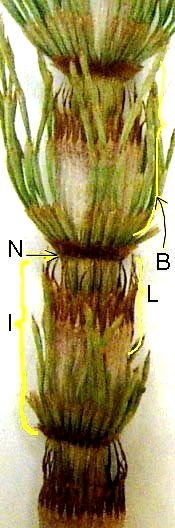
Vegetative stem: N = node, I = internode, B = branch in whorl, L = fused microphylls

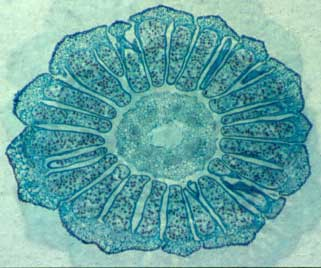
Cross-section through a strobilus; sporangiophores, with attached sporangia (spore capsules) full of spores, can be discerned.

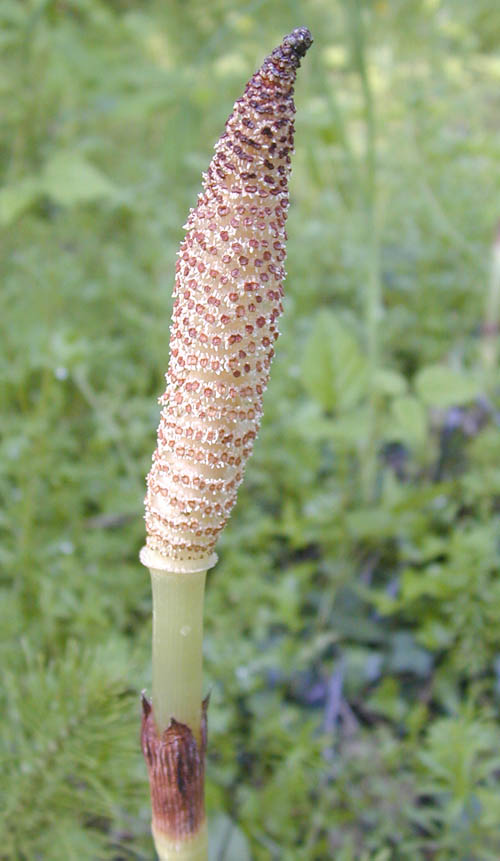
Strobilus of E. braunii, terminal on an unbranched stem

== Taxonomy ==
=== Classification ===
The horsetails and their fossil relatives have long been recognized as distinct from other seedless vascular plants, such as the ferns (Polypodiopsida). Before the advent of modern molecular studies, the relationship of this group to other living and fossil plants was considered problematic. Because of their unclear relationships, the rank botanists assigned to the horsetails varied from order to division. When recognized as a separate division, the literature uses many possible names, including Arthrophyta, Calamophyta, Sphenophyta, or Equisetophyta. Other authors regarded the same group as a class, either within a division consisting of the vascular plants or, more recently, within an expanded fern group. When ranked as a class, the group has been termed the Equisetopsida or Sphenopsida.

Modern phylogenetic analysis, back to 2001, demonstrated that horsetails belong firmly within the fern clade of vascular plants. Smith et al. (2006) carried out the first higher-level pteridophyte classification published in the molecular phylogenetic era, and considered the ferns (monilophytes) to comprise four classes, with the horsetails as class Equisetopsida sensu stricto. (This distinction is necessary because of the alternative usage of Equisetopsida sensu lato as a synonym for all land plants (Embryophyta) with rank of class.) Chase and Reveal (2009) treated the horsetails as subclass Equisetidae of class Equisetopsida sensu lato. The consensus classification produced by the Pteridophyte Phylogeny Group in 2016 also places horsetails in the subclass Equisetidae, but in the class Polypodiopsida (ferns broadly defined).

=== Phylogeny ===
The following diagram shows a likely phylogenic relationship between subclass Equisetidae and the other fern subclasses according to the Pteridophyte Phylogeny Group.

- Polypodiopsida
  - Equisetidae (horsetails)
  - - Ophioglossidae
    - - Marattiidae
      - Polypodiidae

A 2018 study by Elgorriaga et al. suggests the relationships within the Equisetidae are as shown in the following cladogram.

- - †Sphenophyllales
  - Equisetales
    - †Archaeocalamitaceae
    - - - A.G. clade (†Paracalamitina, †Cruciaetheca)
        - †Calamitaceae
      - - †Neocalamitaceae
        - Equisetaceae

According to the study, the age of the crown group of Equisetum dates at least to the Early Cretaceous, and most probably up to the Jurassic.

=== Subdivision ===
Subclass Equisetidae contains a single extant order, Equisetales. This order consists of a single monotypic family, Equisetaceae, with one genus Equisetum. Equisetum has about 20 species.

=== Fossil record ===
The extant horsetails represent a tiny fraction of horsetail diversity in the past. There were three orders of the Equisetidae. The Pseudoborniales first appeared in the late Devonian. The Sphenophyllales were a dominant member of the Carboniferous understory, and prospered until the mid and early Permian. The Equisetales existed alongside the Sphenophyllales, but diversified as that group disappeared into extinction, gradually dwindling in diversity to today's single genus Equisetum.

The organisms first appear in the fossil record during the late Devonian, a time when land plants were undergoing a rapid diversification, with roots, seeds and leaves having only just evolved. (See Evolutionary history of plants) However, plants had already been on the land for almost a hundred million years, with the first evidence of land plants dating to 475 million years ago.
