= 2016 in paleobotany =

This article contains papers in paleobotany that were published in 2016.

== Bryophytes ==
| Name | Novelty | Status | Authors | Age | Unit | Location | Notes | Images |
|---|---|---|---|---|---|---|---|---|
| Bulbosphagnum | Gen. et 2 sp. nov | Valid | Maslova & Ignatov in Maslova et al. | Late Permian | | Russia | A moss belonging to the order Protosphagnales. Genus includes new species B. polyrhizon and B. sublaeve. | |
| Cynodontium eocenicum | Sp. nov | Valid | Ignatov & Kučera in Ignatov et al. | Eocene | Baltic amber | Russia (Kaliningrad Oblast) | A moss. | |
| Krassiloviella | Gen. et sp. nov | Valid | Shelton et al. | Early Cretaceous (Valanginian) | | Canada (British Columbia) | A Tricostaceae moss belonging to the superorder Hypnanae. The type species is K. limbelloides. | |
| Pottiodicranum | Gen. et sp. nov | Valid | Ignatov et al. | Late Eocene | Rovno amber | Ukraine | A moss belonging to the order Dicranales. Genus includes new species P. papillosum. | |
| Taimyrobryum | Gen. et sp. nov | Valid | Ignatov et al. | Late Cretaceous (Santonian) | Taimyr amber | Russia (Krasnoyarsk Krai) | A Bryopsida moss. The type species is Taimyrobryum martynoviorum. | |

== Ferns and fern allies ==
| Name | Novelty | Status | Authors | Age | Unit | Location | Notes | Images |
|---|---|---|---|---|---|---|---|---|
| Asterophyllites tayloriorum | Sp. nov | Valid | Cleal & Shute | Carboniferous (Westphalian) | | United Kingdom | A calamitacean sphenophyte. | |
| Botryopteris sterzelii | Sp. nov | Valid | Barthel | Early Permian | Döhlen Formation | Germany | A fern belonging to the group Coenopteridales, a species of Botryopteris. | |
| Bowmanites haussei | Sp. nov | Valid | Barthel | Early Permian | Döhlen Formation | Germany | A member of Sphenophyllales, a species of Bowmanites. | |
| Cyclosorus scutum | Sp. nov | Valid | Naugolnykh et al. | Eocene | Changchang Formation | China | A Cyclosorus species Thelypteridaceous fern. | |
| Diodonopteris | Gen. et sp. nov | Valid | Ma et al. | Permian (Cisuralian) | | China | A fern belonging to the group Botryopteridaceae. The type specimen is D. gracilis. | |
| Drynaria lanpingensis | Sp. nov | Valid | Huang, Su & Zhou | Late Pliocene | Sanying Formation | China | A basket fern. | |
| Ghoshispora bulbosa | Sp. nov | Valid | Batten, Li & Peng | Late Cretaceous | Nenjiang Formation | China | A plant of uncertain phylogenetic placement, probably a water fern, described on the basis of megaspores. | |
| Ghoshispora zhaoi | Sp. nov | Valid | Batten, Li & Peng | Late Cretaceous | Yaojia Formation | China | A plant of uncertain phylogenetic placement, probably a water fern, described on the basis of megaspores. | |
| Millerocaulis zamunerae | Sp. nov | Valid | Sagasti et al. | Middle–Late Jurassic | La Matilde Formation | Argentina | A member of Osmundaceae. | |
| Neolepisorus chingii | Sp. nov | Valid | Xie et al. | Late Miocene | Bangmai Formation | China | A member of Polypodiaceae, a species of Neolepisorus. | |
| Palaeostachya wagneri | Sp. nov | Valid | Cleal & Shute | Carboniferous (Westphalian) | | United Kingdom | A calamitacean sphenophyte. | |
| Paragiridia | Gen. et sp. nov | Valid | Boardman, Iannuzzi & Dutra | Early Permian | Rio Bonito Formation | Brazil | A member of Sphenopsida. The type species is P. taioensis. | |
| Krameropteris | Gen. et sp. nov | Valid | Schneider, Schmidt & Heinrichs | Cretaceous (Albian-Cenomanian) | | Myanmar | A member of Polypodiales belonging to the group Dennstaedtiaceae. The type species is Krameropteris resinatus. | |
| Polymniopteris | Gen. et comb. nov | Valid | Sundue & Poinar | Eocene or Miocene | Dominican amber | Dominican Republic | A fern; a new genus for "Grammitis" succinea Gómez (1982). | |
| Tecaropteris | Gen. et sp. nov | Valid | Rozefelds, Dettmann & Clifford in Rozefelds et al. | Paleogene | Redbank Plains Formation | Australia | A member of Pteridaceae belonging to the subfamily Parkerioideae (syn. Ceratopteridoideae). The type species is Tecaropteris aquaincola | |

== Conifers ==
| Name | Novelty | Status | Authors | Age | Unit | Location | Notes | Images |
|---|---|---|---|---|---|---|---|---|
| Abies praefirma | Nom. nov | Valid | Doweld | Pliocene | | Japan | A fir cone scale species. A replacement name for Abies protofirma Tanai (1961). | |
| Abiespollenites ananovae | Nom. nov | Valid | Doweld | Miocene (Serravallian) | | Russia (Rostov Oblast) | A fir palynomorph a replacement name for Abies minor Ananova (1974). | |
| Araucarioxylon wagadensis | Sp. nov | Valid | Rai et al. | Middle Jurassic (Callovian) | Gadhada Formation | India | An Araucariaceae petrified wood species. | |
| Araucarites alatisquamosus | Sp. nov | Valid | Ohsawa & Nishida in Ohsawa et al. | Late Eocene – early Oligocene | Loreto Formation | Chile | A member of Araucariaceae. | |
| Athrotaxites stockeyi | Sp. nov | Valid | Escapa et al. | Late Cretaceous | Raritan Formation | United States (New Jersey) | A member of Cupressaceae belonging to the subfamily Athrotaxoideae. | |
| Circoporoxylon kotaense | Sp. nov | Valid | Chinnappa & Rajanikanth | Jurassic | Kota Formation | India | A pinalean petrified wood species | |
| Cunninghamia beardii | Sp. nov | Valid | Buczkowski et al. | Eocene | | Canada (British Columbia) | A species of Cunninghamia. | |
| Xenoxylon junggarensis | Sp. nov | Valid | Wan et al. | Late Triassic (Norian) | Huangshanjie Formation | China | A gymnosperm, a species of Xenoxylon. | |
| Elatides sandaolingensis | Sp. nov | Valid | Wang & Sun in Wang et al. | Middle Jurassic | Xishanyao Formation | China | An Elatides species conifer belonging or related to the family Cupressaceae. | |
| Juniperoxylon schneiderianum | Sp. nov | Valid | Dolezych | Miocene | Brieske Formation | Germany | A member of Cupressaceae. | |
| Laricioxylon erkovetskiense | Sp. nov | Valid | Blokhina & Bondarenko | Miocene | Sazanka Formation | Russia (Amur Oblast) | A member of Pinaceae. | |
| Nidpuria falcatum | Sp. nov | Valid | Parveen & Bhowmik | Triassic | | India | A member of Coniferopsida, possibly a member of Voltziales; a species of Nidpuria. | |
| Picea farjonii | Sp. nov | Valid | Herrera et al. | Early Cretaceous | | Mongolia | A spruce. | |
| Pinus mundayi | Sp. nov | Valid | Falcon-Lang, Mages & Collinson | Early Cretaceous (Valanginian) | Chaswood Formation | Canada (Nova Scotia) | Falcon-Lang, Mages & Collinson (2016) considered it to be a species belonging to the genus Pinus; Hilton, Riding & Rothwell (2016) considered it more likely to be a species belonging to the genus Protopinuxylon. | |
| Pinus pitsidiensis | Sp. nov | Valid | Zidianakis et al. | Late Miocene | | Greece | A pine. | |
| Pinus priamurensis | Sp. nov | Valid | Blokhina & Bondarenko | Miocene | | Russia (Amur Oblast) | A pine. | |
| Pityostrobus stockeyae | Sp. nov | Valid | Herrera et al. | Early Cretaceous | | Mongolia | A member of Pinaceae, a species of Pityostrobus. | |
| Podocarpoxylon donghuaiense | Sp. nov | Valid | Li et al. | Late Eocene | Nadu Formation | China | A member of Podocarpaceae. | |
| Podocarpoxylon gangtaensis | Sp. nov | Valid | Rai et al. | Middle Jurassic (Callovian) | Gadhada Formation | India | A member of Podocarpaceae. | |
| Protaxodioxylon patagonicum | Sp. nov | Valid | Bodnar & Escapa | Early Jurassic | Cañadón Asfalto Basin | Argentina | A member of Cupressaceae described on the basis of fossil woods; might be part of the same plant as Austrohamia minuta. | |
| Protocedroxylon shengjinbeigouense | Sp. nov | Valid | Ding et al. | Early Cretaceous | Yixian Formation | China | A conifer, a species of Protocedroxylon. | |
| Protopiceoxylon yukonense | Sp. nov | Valid | Dolezych & Reinhardt | Paleocene | Moose Channel Formation | Canada (Yukon) | A conifer belonging to the group Protopinaceae. | |
| Prototianshanoxylon | Gen. et 2 sp. nov | Valid | Wei & Zhang in Wei et al. | Permian | | China | A member of Coniferopsida. The type species is Prototianshanoxylon erdaogouense; genus also contains Prototianshanoxylon hamiense. | |
| Sequoiadendron tchucoticum | Sp. nov | Valid | Sokolova in Sokolova & Moiseeva | Late Cretaceous (Santonian-early Campanian) | | Russia (Chukotka Autonomous Okrug) | A species of Sequoiadendron. | |
| Stockeystrobus | Gen. et sp. nov | Valid | Rothwell & Ohana | Late Cretaceous (Conacian–Santonian) | Hoborogawa Formation | Japan | A member of Cupressaceae belonging to the subfamily Sequoioideae. Genus includes new species S. interdigitata. | |
| Taxodioxylon heichengziense | Sp. nov | Valid | Ding et al. | Early Cretaceous | Yixian Formation | China | A conifer, a species of Taxodioxylon. | |
| Thujoxylon beipiaoense | Sp. nov | Valid | Ding et al. | Early Cretaceous | Yixian Formation | China | A conifer, a species of Thujoxylon. | |
| Xenoxylon guangyuanensis | Sp. nov | Valid | Tian et al. | Late Triassic | Xujiahe Formation | China | A Coniferales petrified wood species. | |

== Cycads ==
| Name | Novelty | Status | Authors | Age | Unit | Location | Notes | Images |
|---|---|---|---|---|---|---|---|---|
| Austrozamia | Gen. et sp. nov | Valid | Wilf, Stevenson & Cúneo | Early Eocene | Huitrera Formation | Argentina | A cycad belonging to the family Zamiaceae and the tribe Encephalarteae. Genus includes new species A. stockeyi. | |
| Becklesia maulnyi | Sp. nov | Valid | Le Couls et al. | Late Jurassic (early Oxfordian) | Calcaires de Clerval Formation | France | A cycad. | |
| Encephalartites nipponensis | Sp. nov | Valid | Takimoto & Ohana | Late Jurassic (Oxfordian) | Tochikubo Formation | Japan | A member of Cycadopsida. | |

== Gingkophytes ==
| Name | Novelty | Status | Authors | Age | Unit | Location | Notes | Images |
|---|---|---|---|---|---|---|---|---|
| Baiera aquilonia | Sp. nov | Valid | Pott, van der Burgh & van Konijnenburg-van Cittert | Early Cretaceous (Barremian–Aptian) | Helvetiafjellet Formation | Norway | A member of Ginkgoales, a species of Baiera. | |
| Baiera baishanensis | Sp. nov | Valid | Zhao et al. | Early Cretaceous | Yingzuilazi Formation | China | A member of Ginkgoales, a species of Baiera. | |
| Baiera lebedevii | Sp. nov | Valid | Golovneva | Late Cretaceous (Coniacian) | Amka Formation | Russia | | |
| Ginkgoxylon amurense | Sp. nov | Valid | Afonin | Late Cretaceous (Maastrichtian) | | Russia (Amur Oblast) | A member of Ginkgoaceae. | |
| Ginkgoxylon liaoningense | Sp. nov | Valid | Jiang, Wang, Philippe & Zhang in Jiang et al. | Middle to Late Jurassic | Tiaojishan Formation | China | A member of Ginkgoales of uncertain phylogenetic placement described on the basis of fossil wood. | |
| Sphenobaiera angarensis | Sp. nov | Valid | Kirichkova, Kostina & Nosova | Middle Jurassic (Aalenian-Bajocian) | Prisayansk Formation | Russia | A member of Ginkgoales. | |
| Sphenobaiera irkutensis | Sp. nov | Valid | Kirichkova, Kostina & Nosova | Early Jurassic (Toarcian?) | Cheremkhovo Formation | Russia | A member of Ginkgoales. | |

== "Pteridospermatophytes" ==
=== Glossopteridales ===
| Name | Novelty | Status | Authors | Age | Unit | Location | Notes | Images |
|---|---|---|---|---|---|---|---|---|
| Glossopteris pubescens | Nom. nov | Valid | Degani-Schmidt & Guerra-Sommer | Permian (Sakmarian) | Rio Bonito Formation | Brazil | A Glossopteridaceous species. A replacement name for Glossopteris papillosa (1992). | |
| Karingbalia | Gen. et comb. et sp. nov | Valid | McLoughlin | Permian | | Australia | A member of Glossopteridales. Genus includes K. inglisensis McLoughlin comb. nov., as well as new species K. nychumensis. | |
| Ottokaria minor | Sp. nov | Valid | Marques-de-Souza & Iannuzzi | Permian (Cisuralian) | Rio Bonito Formation | Brazil | A glossopteridalean species | |

=== Medullosales ===
| Name | Novelty | Status | Authors | Age | Unit | Location | Notes | Images |
|---|---|---|---|---|---|---|---|---|
| Cyrillopteris | Gen. et comb. nov | Valid | Laveine & Oudoire | Carboniferous | | France | A member of Medullosales; a new genus for "Odontopteris" genuina. | |
| Neuropteris riazanensis | Sp. nov | Valid | Mosseichik in Mosseichik & Paramonov | Carboniferous (late Bashkirian – early Moscovian) | | Russia (Ryazan Oblast) | A medullosalean species | |
| Wagneropteris | Gen. et sp. nov | Valid | Álvarez-Vázquez & Cleal | Carboniferous (Westphalian) | | Spain | A member of Medullosales, possibly a member of the family Cyclopteridaceae. Genus includes new species W. minima. | |

=== Other pteridospermatophytes ===
| Name | Novelty | Status | Authors | Age | Unit | Location | Notes | Images |
|---|---|---|---|---|---|---|---|---|
| Parkvillia | Gen. et sp. nov | Valid | Serbet et al. | Carboniferous (Pennsylvanian) | Bonner Springs Shale, Kansas City Group | United States (Missouri) | A member of Lyginopteridaceae. Genus includes new species P. northcuttii. | |
| Xylopteris rotundipinnulia | Sp. nov | Valid | Barboni, Dutra & Faccini | Triassic | Santa Maria Formation | Brazil | A member of Corystospermaceae. | |
| Ptilozamites tibeticus | Sp. nov | Valid | Yang in Yang & Li | Early Cretaceous | Linbuzong Formation | China | A seed fern. | |

== Other seed plants ==
| Name | Novelty | Status | Authors | Age | Unit | Location | Notes | Images |
|---|---|---|---|---|---|---|---|---|
| Buckya | Gen. et sp. et comb. nov | Valid | Herbst & Crisafulli | Triassic to Cretaceous | Laguna Colorada Formation | Argentina | A williamsoniaceous bennettitale. The type species is B. austroamericana. Other species are "Bucklandia" indica (1917), "Bucklandia" sahnii (1953), "Bucklandia" guptai (1967), "Bucklandia" dichotoma (1969), "Bucklandia" choschiensis (1969), "Bucklandia" kerae (1999) and "Bucklandia" tsuruokae (1983). | |
| Cordaianthus yongchangensis | Sp. nov | Valid | Wang & Sun in Wang et al. | Early Permian | | China | A member of Cordaitopsida. | |
| Euanthus | Gen. et sp. nov | Valid | Liu & Wang | Jurassic (probably Callovian or Oxfordian) | Jiulongshan Formation | China | A seed plant of uncertain phylogenetic placement. Originally described as an early flowering plant; Herendeen et al. (2017) considered the holotype specimen to be more probably a fragment of slightly disintegrated conifer cone. The type species is Euanthus panii. | |
| Galeacornea guayaguensis | Sp. nov | Valid | Prámparo, Narváez & Mego | Early Cretaceous (probably Albian) | Lagarcito Formation | Argentina | A plant of uncertain phylogenetic placement, possibly a member or a relative of Gnetophyta; a species of Galeacornea. | |
| Harrisiophyllum lanceolatus | Sp. nov | Valid | Chinnappa, Rajanikanth & Rao | Early Cretaceous (Berriasian-Aptian) | Gangapur Formation | India | A gymnosperm of uncertain phylogenetic placement described on the basis of a fossil leaf. | |
| Juraherba | Gen. et sp. nov | Valid | Han & Wang in Han et al. | Middle Jurassic | Jiulongshan Formation | China | Originally described as an early flowering plant, resembling members of Hydatellaceae in general morphology and habit; Herendeen et al. (2017) considered the holotype specimen to be inadequately preserved for critical assessment of the relationships of the taxon. The type species is Juraherba bodae. | |
| Lesleya iberiensis | Sp. nov | Valid | Correia et al. | Carboniferous (early Gzhelian) | Douro Carboniferous Basin | Portugal | A seed plant of uncertain phylogenetic placement (a member of Pteridospermopsida or a cycad). | |
| Phoenicopsis (Windwardia) daohugouensis | Sp. nov | Valid | Huang et al. | Middle Jurassic | Jiulongshan Formation | China | A member of Czekanowskiales, a species of Phoenicopsis. | |
| Pseudoephedra | Gen. et sp. nov | Valid | Liu & Wang | Early Cretaceous (Barremian–Aptian) | Yixian Formation | China | An Ephedra-like seed plant of uncertain phylogenetic placement. The type species is Pseudoephedra paradoxa. | |
| Umkomasia mongolica | Sp. nov | Valid | Shi et al. | Early Cretaceous (Aptian-Albian) | Tevshiin Govi Formation | Mongolia | First proposed as a member of Umkomasiales (also known as Corystospermales) and a species of Umkomasia; Moved to Doylea mongolica in (paleobotany), an incertae sedis genus. | |
| Welsbergia | Gen. et comb. nov | Valid | Pott et al. | Late Triassic (Rhaetian) | | Germany | A member of Bennettitales. The type species is Welsbergia bursigera (Harris). | |

== Flowering plants ==
| Name | Novelty | Status | Authors | Age | Unit | Location | Notes | Images |
|---|---|---|---|---|---|---|---|---|
| Afrocasia | Gen. et sp. nov | Valid | Coiffard & Mohr | Late Cretaceous (Campanian) | | Egypt | A member of the family Araceae. Genus includes new species A. kahlertiana. | |
| Alatonucula | Gen. et sp. nov | Valid | Hermsen & Gandolfo | Early Eocene | | Argentina | A member of Juglandaceae. The type specimen is A. ignis. | |
| Andiroxylon thanobolensis | Sp. nov | Valid | Khan et al. | Miocene | Manchar Formation | Pakistan | A member of Fabaceae, a species of Andiroxylon. | |
| Annulites | Gen. et sp. nov | Valid | Poinar | Late Oligocene-early Miocene | | Mexico | A member of Orchidaceae belonging to the tribe Cranichideae and the subtribe Cranichidinae. Genus includes A. mexicana. | |
| Antiquifloris | Gen. et sp. nov | Valid | Poinar & Buckley in Poinar, Buckley & Chen | Early Cretaceous (late Albian) | Burmese amber | Myanmar | A eumagnoliid of uncertain phylogenetic placement. The type specimen is A. latifibris. | |
| Aporosa ecocenicus | Sp. nov | Valid | Shukla et al. | Early Eocene | Palana Formation | India | A species of Aporosa. | |
| Archeampelos yellowstonica | Nom. nov | Valid | Doweld | Paleocene | | United States (Montana) | A replacement name for Populus cordata Newberry (1868). | |
| Banksia cooksoniae | Nom. nov | Valid | Carpenter, Jordan & Hill | Cenozoic | | Australia | A species of Banksia; a replacement name for Banksieaephyllum acuminatum Cookson & Duigan (1950). | |
| Banksieaefolia | Gen. et comb. nov | Valid | Carpenter, Jordan & Hill | Cenozoic | | Australia | A member of Banksieae of uncertain phylogenetic placement, described on the basis of fossil leaves not assignable to any extant genus of Banksieae. Genus includes "Banksieaephyllum" incisum Blackburn (1981) and "Banksieaephyllum" cuneatum Hill & Christophel (1988). | |
| ? Berchemia altorhenana | Sp. nov | Valid | Kovar-Eder | Early Oligocene | Bodenheim Formation | Germany | Possibly a member of the family Rhamnaceae. | |
| Boreocarya | Gen. et comb. nov | Valid | Doweld | Miocene | | Russia (Sverdlovsk Oblast) | A member of the family Juglandaceae; a new genus for "Sphaerocarya" uralensis Dorofeev (1970). | |
| Brevitrimaris | Gen. et sp. nov | Valid | Chambers & Poinar | Eocene or Miocene | Dominican amber | Dominican Republic | A monocotyledon of uncertain phylogenetic placement, possibly a relative of the family Haemodoraceae. The type specimen is B. arcuatus. | |
| Caliciflora | Gen. et sp. nov | Valid | Friis, Pedersen & Crane | Late Cretaceous (early Cenomanian) | Potomac Group (Elk Neck Beds) | United States (Maryland) | A eudicot, probably a member or a relative of rosids. Genus includes new species is C. mauldiniensis | |
| Camellia nanningensis | Sp. nov | Valid | Huang et al. | Late Oligocene | Yongning Formation | China | A species of Camellia. | |
| Campopetala | Gen. et sp. nov | Valid | Poinar & Chambers | Eocene or Miocene | Dominican amber | Dominican Republic | A member of Mimosoideae. The type specimen is C. dominicana. | |
| Carpolithus boldensis | Sp. nov | Valid | Blanchard, Wang & Dilcher | Early Eocene | Tallahatta Formation | United States (Mississippi) | A fossil fruit, probably a monocot (grass) fruit. | |
| Catalpa hispaniolae | Sp. nov | Valid | Poinar | Eocene to Miocene | Dominican amber | Dominican Republic | A species of Catalpa. | |
| Cecilanthus | Gen. et sp. nov | Valid | Herendeen et al. | Late Cretaceous (early Cenomanian) | Potomac Group | United States (Maryland) | A flowering plant of uncertain phylogenetic placement. Genus includes new species C. polymerus. | |
| Celastrus caducidentatus | Sp. nov | Valid | Liang & Zhou in Liang et al. | Miocene | | China | A species of Celastrus. | |
| Cinnamomophyllum vicente-castellum | Sp. nov | Valid | Marmi | Late Cretaceous (early Maastrichtian) | Tremp Formation | Spain | A member of Laurales of uncertain phylogenetic placement. | |
| Cissus andrewsii | Sp. nov | Valid | Adams, Collinson, Smith & Bamford in Adams et al. | Early Miocene | Hiwegi Formation | Kenya | A species of Cissus. | |
| Cissus psilata | Sp. nov | Valid | Adams, Collinson, Smith & Bamford in Adams et al. | Early Miocene | Hiwegi Formation | Kenya | A species of Cissus. | |
| Cissus rusingensis | Sp. nov | Valid | Adams, Collinson, Smith & Bamford in Adams et al. | Early Miocene | Hiwegi Formation | Kenya | A species of Cissus. | |
| Cladites vesiculaeferens | Sp. nov | Valid | Kovar-Eder | Early Oligocene | Bodenheim Formation | Germany | A flowering plant of uncertain phylogenetic placement. | |
| Cobbania hickeyi | Sp. nov | Valid | Stockey, Rothwell & Johnson | Late Cretaceous (late Maastrichtian) | Hell Creek Formation | United States (South Dakota) | A member of Araceae. | |
| Cylindrocites | Gen. et sp. nov | Valid | Poinar | Eocene-Miocene | El Mamey Formation (Dominican amber) | Dominican Republic | A member of Orchidaceae belonging to the tribe Cranichideae and the subtribe Spiranthinae. Genus includes C. browni. | |
| Dalembia argentea | Sp. nov | Valid | Yudova & Golovneva in Yudova, Golovneva & Alekseev | Late Cretaceous (Turonian-Coniacian) | Chingandzha Formation | Russia | | |
| Dalembia jiayinensis | Sp. nov | Valid | Sun et al. | Late Cretaceous (Santonian) | Yong'ancun Formation | China | A member of Magnoliopsida of uncertain phylogenetic placement. | |
| Dicotylophyllum badense | Sp. nov | Valid | Kovar-Eder | Early Oligocene | Bodenheim Formation | Germany | A dicotyledon of uncertain phylogenetic placement. | |
| Dicotylophyllum bohemicum | Nom. nov | Valid | Halamski & Kvaček | Late Cretaceous (Coniacian) | | Czech Republic | A dicotyledon of uncertain phylogenetic placement; a replacement name for Rhus cretacea Velenovský (1885). | |
| Dicotylophyllum oechsleri | Sp. nov | Valid | Kovar-Eder | Early Oligocene | Bodenheim Formation | Germany | A dicotyledon of uncertain phylogenetic placement. | |
| Dicotylophyllum vesiculaeferens | Sp. nov | Valid | Kovar-Eder | Early Oligocene | Bodenheim Formation | Germany | A dicotyledon of uncertain phylogenetic placement. | |
| Dicotylophyllum ziegleri | Sp. nov | Valid | Kovar-Eder | Early Oligocene | Bodenheim Formation | Germany | A dicotyledon of uncertain phylogenetic placement. | |
| Dipelta bovayensis | Sp. nov | Valid | Blanchard, Wang & Dilcher | Early Eocene | Tallahatta Formation | United States (Mississippi) | A species of Dipelta. | |
| Dipterocarpus churiensis | Sp. nov. | Valid | Prasad & Gautam | Late Miocene | Middle Churia Formation | Nepal | A species of Dipterocarpus. | |
| Dipterocarpus miocenicus | Sp. nov. | Valid | Prasad & Gautam | Late Miocene | Middle Churia Formation | Nepal | A species of Dipterocarpus. | |
| Dipterocarpus nepalensis | Sp. nov. | Valid | Prasad & Gautam | Late Miocene | Middle Churia Formation | Nepal | A species of Dipterocarpus. | |
| Distylium metzleri | Sp. nov | Valid | Kovar-Eder | Early Oligocene | Bodenheim Formation | Germany | A species of Distylium | |
| Dryobalanoxylon neyveliensis Sp. nov | Valid | Kumarasamy & Elayaraja | Miocene | Neyveli Lignite Formation | India | A member of Dipterocarpaceae. | | |
| Ekrixanthera | Gen. et 2 sp. nov | Valid | Poinar, Kevan & Jackes | Eocene to Miocene | | Dominican Republic; Mexico | A member of Urticaceae. Genus includes E. hispaniolae and E. ehecatli. | |
| Elodeophyllum | Gen. et sp. nov. | Valid | Nagrale et al. | Late Cretaceous (Maastrichtian) | Deccan Intertrappean Beds | India | A member of the family Hydrocharitaceae described on the basis of a fossil leaf. Genus includes new species E. deccanii. | |
| Entada hispaniolae | Sp. nov | Valid | Poinar & Chambers | Eocene or Miocene | Dominican amber | Dominican Republic | A member of Mimosoideae belonging to the genus Entada. | |
| Ettingshausenia vetviensis | Sp. nov | Valid | Herman in Herman & Sokolova | Late Cretaceous (Turonian–Coniacian) | Vetvinskaya Member (Chalbugchan Group) | Russia (Kamchatka Krai) | A member of Platanofolia, a species of Ettingshausenia. | |
| Eydeia | Gen. et sp. nov | Valid | Stockey, Nishida & Atkinson | Late Cretaceous (Coniacian-Santonian) | Haborogawa Formation | Japan | A member of Cornales. Genus includes new species E. hokkaidoensis. | |
| Ficus obtusatoides | Nom. nov | Valid | Doweld | Oligocene (Chattian) | | Switzerland | A species of Ficus; a replacement name for Ficus obtusata Heer (1856) (preoccupied). | |
| Ficus tethyca | Nom. nov | Valid | Doweld | Eocene | | United Kingdom | A species of Ficus; a replacement name for Ficus lucida Chandler (1962) (preoccupied). | |
| Globocarya | Nom. nov | Valid | Doweld | Miocene | | Russia (Tomsk Oblast) | A member of the family Juglandaceae; a replacement name for Sphaerocarya Dorofeev (1970). | |
| Globosites | Gen. et sp. nov | Valid | Poinar | Eocene or Miocene | | Dominican Republic | A member of Orchidaceae known from Dominican amber. The type species is Globosites apicola. | |
| Hedycarya pluvisilva | Sp. nov | Valid | Bannister, Conran, Mildenhall & Lee in Conran et al. | Early Miocene | | New Zealand | A species of Hedycarya. | |
| Hedycaryoxylon burmeisteri | Sp. nov | Valid | Egerton, Williams & Lacovara | Late Cretaceous (late Campanian to early Maastrichtian) | Cerro Fortaleza Formation | Argentina | A member of Monimiaceae, a species of Hedycaryoxylon. | |
| Humulago | Nom. nov | Valid | Doweld | Oligocene | | Russia | A member of Cannabaceae; a replacement name for Humularia Dorofeev (1982). | |
| Itaquixylon | Gen. et sp. nov | Valid | Benicio et al. | Late Pleistocene | Touro Passo Formation | Brazil | A member of the family Fabaceae belonging to the subfamily Mimosoideae. Genus includes new species I. heterogenum. | |
| Jamesrosea | Gen. et sp. nov | Valid | Crepet et al. | Cretaceous (Albian or Cenomanian) | | Myanmar | A member of Laurales, probably related to Atherospermataceae and Gomortegaceae. The type species is Jamesrosea burmensis. | |
| Jusinghipollis ticoensis | Sp. nov | Valid | Llorens & Perez Loinaze | Early Cretaceous (Aptian) | Anfiteatro de Ticó Formation | Argentina | A flowering plant known from pollen grains, a species of Jusinghipollis. | |
| Koelreuteria quasipaniculata | Sp. nov | Valid | Li, Xiao & He in Li et al. | Miocene | Garang Formation | China | A species of Koelreuteria. | |
| Laurinoxylon chalatenangensis | Sp. nov | Valid | Cevallos-Ferriz, Cerón López & Flores Rocha | Miocene | Chalatenango Formation | El Salvador | A member of Lauraceae, a species of Laurinoxylon. | |
| Laurophyllum rauenbergense | Sp. nov | Valid | Kovar-Eder | Early Oligocene | Bodenheim Formation | Germany | A member of the family Lauraceae described on the basis of fossil leaves. | |
| Lobocyclas | Gen. et sp. nov | Valid | Chambers & Poinar | Eocene or Miocene | Dominican amber | Dominican Republic | A member of Celastraceae belonging to the subfamily Hippocrateoideae. The type specimen is L. anomala. | |
| Lonchocarpus miocenicus | Sp. nov | Valid | Hernández-Damián et al. | Miocene | | Mexico | A species of Lonchocarpus. | |
| Lunania floresi | Sp. nov | Valid | Hernández-Damián, Calvillo-Canadell & Cevallos-Ferriz | Miocene | | Mexico | A species of Lunania. | |
| Machilus maomingensis | Sp. nov | Valid | Jin & Tang in Tang et al. | Eocene | Youganwo Formation | China | A species of Machilus. | |
| Mahonia mioasiatica | Sp. nov | Valid | Huang et al. | Late Miocene | Xiaolongtan Formation | China | A species of Mahonia. | |
| Maladenodiscus | Gen. et sp. nov | Valid | Poinar, Chambers & Brown | Eocene | Baltic amber | Russia (Kaliningrad Oblast) | A dicotyledon of uncertain phylogenetic placement. Genus includes new species M. acanthinus. | |
| Malloranga dentata | Sp. nov | Valid | Conran, Lee & Reichgelt | Miocene | | New Zealand | A member of Euphorbiaceae belonging to the subfamily Acalyphoideae, a species of Malloranga. | |
| Mciveriella | Nom. nov | Valid | Doweld | Paleocene | Paskapoo Formation | Canada (Alberta) | A replacement name for Harmsia McIver & Basinger (1993). | |
| Menispermophyllum isonensis | Sp. nov | Valid | Marmi | Late Cretaceous (early Maastrichtian) | Tremp Formation | Spain | A eudicot of uncertain phylogenetic placement. | |
| Metrosideros leunigii | Sp. nov | Valid | Tarran, Wilson & Hill | Eocene-Early Oligocene | | Australia | A species of Metrosideros. | |
| Myrica obliquifolia | Sp. nov | Valid | Kovar-Eder | Early Oligocene | Bodenheim Formation | Germany | A species of Myrica. | |
| Nymphaea elisabethae | Sp. nov | Valid | Gee & Taylor | Late Oligocene | | Germany | A species of Nymphaea. | |
| Ochnaceoxylon | Gen. et sp. nov. | Valid | Ramteke & Kapgate | Late Cretaceous (Maastrichtian)–Paleogene | Deccan Intertrappean Beds | India | A member of the family Ochnaceae described on the basis of fossil wood. Genus includes new species O. tertiera. | |
| Oleinites altorhenana | Sp. nov | Valid | Kovar-Eder | Early Oligocene | Bodenheim Formation | Germany | A member of the family Oleaceae. | |
| Oleinites rauenbergensis | Sp. nov | Valid | Kovar-Eder | Early Oligocene | Bodenheim Formation | Germany | A member of the family Oleaceae. | |
| Ormosioxylon chinjiensis | Sp. nov | Valid | Soomro et al. | Miocene | Chinji Formation | Pakistan | A member of Fabaceae, a species of Ormosioxylon. | |
| Palaeocarya lincangensis | Sp. nov | Valid | Shao & Xie in Shao et al. | Late Miocene | Bangmai Basin | China | | |
| Palaeocarya longipedicelata | Sp. nov | Valid | Dong & Sun in Dong et al. | Oligocene | Ningming Formation | China | A member of Juglandaceae, a species of Palaeocarya. | |
| Paleopanax boldensis | Sp. nov | Valid | Blanchard, Wang & Dilcher | Early Eocene | Tallahatta Formation | United States (Mississippi) | A member of Araliaceae. | |
| Paraquercus | Gen. et 2 sp. nov | Valid | Grímsson et al. | Late Cretaceous (Campanian)-Eocene | Allenby Formation; Eagle Formation | Canada (British Columbia); Greenland; United States (Wyoming) | A member of the family Fagaceae described on the basis of pollen. Genus includes new species P. campania and P. eocaena. | |
| Parinari panamensis | Sp. nov | Valid | Jud, Nelson & Herrera | Early Miocene | Culebra Formation; Cucaracha Formation; La Boca Formation | Panama | A species of Parinari. | |
| Parvileguminophyllum penzhinense | Sp. nov | Valid | Herman in Herman & Sokolova | Late Cretaceous (Turonian–Coniacian) | Vetvinskaya Member (Chalbugchan Group) | Russia (Kamchatka Krai) | A member of Legumifolia, a species of Parvileguminophyllum. | |
| Patocarpus | Gen. et sp. nov | Valid | Cevallos-Ferriz & Vázquez-Rueda | Late Cretaceous | Cerro del Pueblo Formation | Mexico | A member of Proteales of uncertain phylogenetic placement. Genus includes new species P. coahuilensis. | |
| Perforatocarpum | Gen. et comb. nov | Valid | Stull, Adams, Manchester & Collinson in Stull et al. | Eocene | | United Kingdom | A member of Icacinaceae related to members of the tribe Phytocreneae. Genus includes "Icacinicarya" echinata Chandler (1961). | |
| Persea miogamblei | Sp. nov | Valid | Khan & Bera | Middle Miocene | Gish Clay Formation | India | A species of Persea. | |
| Persea neovillosa | Sp. nov | Valid | Khan & Bera | Middle Miocene | Gish Clay Formation | India | A species of Persea. | |
| Phyrtandrus | Gen. et sp. nov | Valid | Chambers & Poinar | Uncertain (Eocene to Miocene) | Dominican amber | Dominican Republic | A flowering plant of uncertain phylogenetic placement. Genus includes new species P. pentalepidus. | |
| Planarpollenites | Gen. et sp. nov | Valid | Mildenhall in Conran et al. | Early Miocene | | New Zealand | A pollen of a member of the family Monimiaceae. Genus includes new species P. fragilis. | |
| Populus zhenyuanensis | Sp. nov | Valid | Liang & Zhou in Liang et al. | Miocene | Dajie Formation | China | A species of Populus. | |
| Portulacaceocarpon | Gen. et sp. nov. | Valid | Borkar et al. | Late Cretaceous-Paleogene | Deccan Intertrappean beds | India | Fossil fruit with similarities to fruits of members of the family Portulacaceae. Genus includes new species P. bhuterensis. | |
| Potamogeton baluevae | Nom. nov | Valid | Doweld | Miocene (Burdigalian) | | Russia (Tomsk Oblast) | A species of Potamogeton; a replacement name for Potamogeton decipiens Nikitin (preoccupied). | |
| Potamogeton borsukiae | Nom. nov | Valid | Doweld | Miocene (Burdigalian) | | Russia (Tomsk Oblast) | A species of Potamogeton; a replacement name for Potamogeton carinatus Nikitin (preoccupied). | |
| Potamogeton gorbunovii | Nom. nov | Valid | Doweld | Middle Pleistocene | | Russia (Voronezh Oblast) | A species of Potamogeton; a replacement name for Potamogeton pseudofriesii Dorofeev (preoccupied). | |
| Potamogeton jakubovskajae | Nom. nov | Valid | Doweld | Pliocene (Piacenzian) | | Belarus | A species of Potamogeton; a replacement name for Potamogeton praenatans Dorofeev (preoccupied). | |
| Potamogeton kasakorum | Nom. nov | Valid | Doweld | Pliocene (Piacenzian) | | Russia (Rostov Oblast) | A species of Potamogeton; a replacement name for Potamogeton pliocenicus Dorofeev (preoccupied). | |
| Potamogeton kolesnikovae | Nom. nov | Valid | Doweld | Pliocene (Piacenzian) | | Russia (Bashkortostan) | A species of Potamogeton; a replacement name for Potamogeton stylatus Dorofeev & Wieliczkiewicz in Dorofeev (preoccupied). | |
| Potamogeton kondinskajae | Nom. nov | Valid | Doweld | Pleistocene (Gelasian) | | Russia (Tambov Oblast) | A species of Potamogeton; a replacement name for Potamogeton obtusus Dorofeev (preoccupied). | |
| Potamogeton novorossicus | Nom. nov | Valid | Doweld | Miocene (Messinian) | | Ukraine | A species of Potamogeton; a replacement name for Potamogeton corniculatus Negru (preoccupied). | |
| Potamogeton pashkovii | Nom. nov | Valid | Doweld | Pleistocene (Gelasian) | | Russia (Lipetsk Oblast) | A species of Potamogeton; a replacement name for Potamogeton striatus Dorofeev (preoccupied). | |
| Potamogeton rutiloides | Nom. nov | Valid | Doweld | Pleistocene (Gelasian) | | Russia (Tambov Oblast) | A species of Potamogeton; a replacement name for Potamogeton palaeorutilus Dorofeev (preoccupied). | |
| Potamogeton snigirevskajae | Nom. nov | Valid | Doweld | Pliocene (Piacenzian) | | Russia (Rostov Oblast) | A species of Potamogeton; a replacement name for Potamogeton microcarpus Dorofeev (preoccupied). | |
| Potamogeton volgensis | Nom. nov | Valid | Doweld | Pliocene (Piacenzian) | | Russia (Tatarstan) | A species of Potamogeton; a replacement name for Potamogeton tataricus Dorofeev & Wieliczkiewicz in Dorofeev (preoccupied). | |
| Pseudobanksia | Gen. et comb. nov | Valid | Carpenter, Jordan & Hill | Cenozoic | | Australia | A plant described on the basis of fossil leaves, sharing convergent traits with members of the genus Banksia. Genus includes "Banksia" fastigata Deane (1925), "Banksieaephyllum" attenuatum Hill & Christophel (1988), "Banksieaephyllum" longifolium Hill & Merrifield (1993), "Banksieaephyllum" pinnatum Cookson & Duigan (1950), "Banksieaephyllum" praefastigatum Vadala & Drinnan (1998), "Banksieaephyllum" regularis Hill & Christophel (1988), "Banksieaephyllum" westdaliense Hill & Merrifield (1993) and "Phyllites" yallournensis Cookson & Duigan (1950). | |
| Pterocarya rhoifolioides | Nom. nov | Valid | Doweld | Miocene | | Japan; Russia (Primorsky Krai; Sakhalin Oblast) | A species of Pterocarya; a replacement name for Juglans japonica Tanai (1961). | |
| Quercus tibetensis | Sp. nov | Valid | Xu, Su & Zhou in Xu et al. | Late Miocene | Lawula Formation | China | An oak. | |
| Rariglanda | Gen. et sp. nov | Valid | Martínez & Choo in Martínez et al. | Late Cretaceous (Turonian–Coniacian) | Raritan Formation | United States (New Jersey) | A member of Ericales related to the family Clethraceae. Genus includes new species R. jerseyensis. | |
| Rhamnica | Nom. nov | Valid | Doweld | Paleocene | Denver Formation | United States (Colorado) | A member of Rhamnaceae; a replacement name for Rhamnites Forbes ex McIver & Basinger (1993). | |
| Rourea miocaudata | Sp. nov | Valid | Khan & Bera | Miocene | Dafla Formation | India | A member of Connaraceae, a species of Rourea. | |
| Rosa fortuita | Sp. nov | Valid | Su & Zhou in Su et al. | Late Miocene | | China | A species of rose. | |
| Rudiculites | Gen. et sp. nov | Valid | Poinar | Eocene or Miocene | | Dominican Republic | A member of Orchidaceae known from Dominican amber. The type species is Rudiculites dominicana. | |
| Saliciphyllum serratum | Sp. nov | Valid | Marmi | Late Cretaceous (early Maastrichtian) | Tremp Formation | Spain | A possible member of the family Salicaceae. | |
| Sapindopsis turolensis | Sp. nov | Valid | Sender et al. | Early Cretaceous (Albian) | | Spain | A member of Platanaceae, a species of Sapindopsis. | |
| Shorea bhalukpongensis | Sp. nov | Valid | Khan, Spicer & Bera in Khan et al. | Pliocene | | India | A species of Shorea. | |
| Shorea chandernagarensis | Sp. nov | Valid | Khan, Spicer & Bera in Khan et al. | Late Pliocene-early Pleistocene | | India | A species of Shorea. | |
| Shorea mioobtusa | Sp. nov | Valid | Khan, Spicer & Bera in Khan et al. | Miocene | | India | A species of Shorea. | |
| Shorea pinjoliensis | Sp. nov | Valid | Khan, Spicer & Bera in Khan et al. | Miocene | | India | A species of Shorea. | |
| Shorea pliotumbuggaia | Sp. nov | Valid | Khan, Spicer & Bera in Khan et al. | Pliocene | | India | A species of Shorea. | |
| Silene novorossica | Nom. nov | Valid | Doweld | Miocene (Tortonian) | | Ukraine | A species of Silene; a replacement name for Silene mirabilis Negru (1986). | |
| Strychnos electri | Sp. nov | Valid | Poinar & Struwe | Eocene or Miocene | | Dominican Republic | A member of Loganiaceae found in Dominican amber, a species of Strychnos. | |
| Styrax mikii | Nom. nov | Valid | Doweld | Pliocene | | Japan | A species of Styrax; a replacement name for Styrax laevigatus Miki (1941). | |
| Styrax plionipponicus | Nom. nov | Valid | Doweld | Pliocene | | Japan | A species of Styrax; a replacement name for Styrax rugosus Miki (1941). | |
| Suciacarpa | Gen. et sp. nov | Valid | Atkinson | Late Cretaceous (Campanian) | Cedar District Formation | United States (Washington) | A member of Cornales of uncertain phylogenetic placement. Genus includes S. starrii. | |
| ? Ternstroemites maritiae | Sp. nov | Valid | Kovar-Eder | Early Oligocene | Bodenheim Formation | Germany | A member of Ericales, possibly a member of the family Pentaphyllaceae. | |
| Trachelospermum kelleri | Sp. nov | Valid | Kovar-Eder | Early Oligocene | Bodenheim Formation | Germany | A species of Trachelospermum. | |
| Trapa duensis | Nom. nov | Valid | Doweld | Tertiary | | Russia (Sakhalin Oblast) | A water caltrop; a replacement name for Trapa sachalinensis Vassiljev in Baranov (1954) (preoccupied). | |
| Trapa minor | Nom. nov | Valid | Doweld | Pleistocene | | Czech Republic | A water caltrop; a replacement name for Trapa minuta Opravil (1966) (preoccupied). | |
| Trapa mionipponica | Nom. nov | Valid | Doweld | Miocene | | Japan | A water caltrop; a replacement name for Trapa mikii Suzuki (1961) (preoccupied). | |
| Trapa plioincisa | Nom. nov | Valid | Doweld | Pliocene | | Japan | A water caltrop; a replacement name for Trapa pseudoincisa Vassiljev in Baranov (1954) (preoccupied). | |
| Tricolpites tortuous | Sp. nov | Valid | Korasidis et al. | Early Cretaceous (Albian) | Eumeralla Formation | Australia | | |
| Tricorniger | Nom. nov | | Doweld | Miocene | | Czech Republic; Germany | A flowering plant of uncertain phylogenetic placement; a replacement name for Schenkiella Wójcicki & Kvaček (2002) (considered by Doweld to be a parahomonym of Schenckiella Hennings, 1893). The type species is "Trapa" credneri Schenk (1877). | |
| Verneda | Gen. et sp. nov | Valid | Moreau et al. | Late Cretaceous (Cenomanian) | | France | A relative of members of the family Platanaceae. Genus includes V. hermaphroditica. | |
| Vernifolium | Gen. et sp. nov | Valid | Jud & Sohn | Early Cretaceous | Potomac Group | United States (Virginia) | A herbaceous eudicot, possibly related to Ranunculales. The type species is Vernifolium tenuiloba. | |
| ? Viscophyllum hendriksiae | Sp. nov | Valid | Kovar-Eder | Early Oligocene | Bodenheim Formation | Germany | Possibly a member of the family Loranthaceae. | |
| Zanthoxylum trachyspermum | Sp. nov | Valid | Zhu & Zhou in Zhu et al. | Late Miocene | | China | A member of Rutaceae, a species of Zanthoxylum. | |

== Other plants ==
| Name | Novelty | Status | Authors | Age | Unit | Location | Notes | Images |
|---|---|---|---|---|---|---|---|---|
| Adinosporus | Gen. et 3 sp. nov | Valid | Strother | Cambrian | | United States (Tennessee) | A green alga belonging to the group Charophyta. The type species is Adinosporus voluminosus; genus also contains Adinosporus bullatus and Adinosporus geminus. | |
| Anatolipora macroporelloidea | Sp. nov | Valid | Vachard & Cózar in Vachard et al. | Carboniferous (Mississippian) | | France | A green alga, possibly a member of Ulotrichales. | |
| Brabantophyton | Gen. et sp. nov | Valid | Momont, Gerrienne & Prestianni | Devonian (mid Givetian to earliest Frasnian) | | Belgium | A member of Stenokoleales (a group of plants of uncertain phylogenetic placement, possibly related to the seed plants). The type species is Brabantophyton runcariense. | |
| Charites badamica | Sp. nov | Valid | Gereltsetseg | Late Oligocene | | Mongolia | A green alga belonging to the group Charophyta. | |
| Dyadospora asymmetrica | Sp. nov | Valid | Ghavidel-Syooki | Ordovician (Katian-Hirnantian) | Ghelli Formation | Iran | An early land plant described on the basis of cryptospores. | |
| Dyadospora verrucata | Sp. nov | Valid | Ghavidel-Syooki | Ordovician (Katian-Hirnantian) | Ghelli Formation | Iran | An early land plant described on the basis of cryptospores. | |
| Guangnania minor | Sp. nov | Valid | Edwards, Geng & Li | Early Devonian | Pingyipu Group | China | A member of Zosterophyllopsida. | |
| Imperfectotriletes persianense | Sp. nov | Valid | Ghavidel-Syooki | Ordovician (Katian-Hirnantian) | Ghelli Formation | Iran | An early land plant described on the basis of cryptospores. | |
| Lundbladispora punctata | Sp. nov | Valid | Césari & Colombi | Late Triassic | Ischigualasto Formation | Argentina | A lycophyte described on the basis of spores. | |
| Melvillipteris | Gen. et sp. nov | Valid | Xue & Basinger | Devonian (Famennian) | | Canada (Nunavut) | A member of Rhacophytales. The type species is Melvillipteris quadriseriata. | |
| Mesochara magna | Sp. nov | Valid | Trabelsi & Martín-Closas in Trabelsi et al. | Early Cretaceous | Kebar Formation | Tunisia | A green alga belonging to the group Charophyta. | |
| Microlejeunea nyiahae | Sp. nov | Valid | Heinrichs, Lee, Schäfer-Verwimp & Schmidt in Heinrichs et al. | Eocene (Ypresian) | Cambay amber | India | A liverwort belonging to the family Lejeuneaceae; a species of Microlejeunea. | |
| Neoradiosphaeroporella | Gen. et sp. nov | Valid | Cózar & Vachard in Vachard et al. | Carboniferous (Mississippian) | | France; Spain | A green alga belonging to the group Dasycladales, possibly a member of the family Polyphysaceae. The type specimen is N. aprica. | |
| Pallaviciniites sandaolingensis | Sp. nov | Valid | Li et al. | Middle Jurassic | Xishanyao Formation | China | A thalloid liverwort, a species of Pallaviciniites. | |
| Paraepimastopora somervillei | Sp. nov | Valid | Vachard & Cózar in Vachard et al. | Carboniferous (Mississippian) | | Algeria; France; Ireland; Morocco; Slovakia; Spain; United Kingdom | A green alga belonging to the group Dasycladales and the family Seletonellaceae. | |
| Radicites gobiensis | Sp. nov | Valid | Naugolnykh | Late Cretaceous | Djadochta Formation | Mongolia | A vascular plant described on the basis of isolated roots. | |
| Radix | Gen. et sp. nov | | Hetherington, Dubrovsky & Dolan | Carboniferous (Bashkirian) | | United Kingdom | A vascular plant of uncertain phylogenetic placement. The type species is R. carbonica. | |
| Radula baltica | Sp. nov | Valid | Heinrichs et al. | Eocene | Baltic amber | Europe (Baltic Sea coast) | A liverwort, a species of Radula. | |
| Rebouliothallus | Gen. et sp. nov | Valid | Li & Sun in Li et al. | Early Cretaceous | Huolinhe Formation | China | A liverwort belonging to the family Aytoniaceae. The type specimen is R. huolinhensis. | |
| Reticella | Gen. et sp. nov | Valid | Agić | Early Cambrian | Lükati Formation | Estonia | A member of Chlorophyta belonging to the group Prasinophyceae. Genus includes new species R. corrugata. | |
| Retusotriletes herbstii | Sp. nov | Valid | Césari & Colombi | Late Triassic | Ischigualasto Formation | Argentina | A lycophyte described on the basis of spores. | |
| Rimosotetras granulata | Sp. nov | Valid | Ghavidel-Syooki | Ordovician (Katian-Hirnantian) | Ghelli Formation | Iran | An early land plant described on the basis of cryptospores. | |
| Rimosotetras punctata | Sp. nov | Valid | Ghavidel-Syooki | Ordovician (Katian-Hirnantian) | Ghelli Formation | Iran | An early land plant described on the basis of cryptospores. | |
| Segestrespora iranense | Sp. nov | Valid | Ghavidel-Syooki | Ordovician (Katian-Hirnantian) | Ghelli Formation | Iran | An early land plant described on the basis of cryptospores. | |
| Sigillariostrobus barkeri | Sp. nov | Valid | Thomas & Seyfullah | Carboniferous (Bolsovian) | | United Kingdom | A lycophyte belonging to the group Sigillariostrobaceae, a species of Sigillariostrobus. | |
| Sigillariostrobus saltwellensis | Sp. nov | Valid | Thomas & Seyfullah | Carboniferous (Langsettian–Duckmantian) | | United Kingdom | A lycophyte belonging to the group Sigillariostrobaceae, a species of Sigillariostrobus. | |
| Spissuspora | Gen. et sp. nov | Valid | Strother | Cambrian | | United States (Tennessee) | A green alga belonging to the group Charophyta. The type species is Spissuspora laevigata. | |
| Vidalgea | Gen. et sp. nov | Valid | Strother | Cambrian | | United States (Tennessee) | A green alga belonging to the group Charophyta. The type species is Vidalgea maculata. | |
| Vittella | Gen. et sp. nov | Valid | Filipiak & Zatoń | Devonian (early Famennian) | | Poland | A possible member of Bryopsidales. The type species is V. dixii. | |
| Walcottophycus | Gen. et comb. nov | Valid | Wu & LoDuca in Wu et al. | Cambrian | Burgess Shale; Kaili Formation | Canada; China | A possible member of Chlorophyta. The type species is "Bosworthia" gyges Walcott (1919). | |
| Yanmenia | Gen. et comb. nov | Valid | Edwards, Geng & Li | Early Devonian | Pingyipu Group | China | A plant of uncertain phylogenetic placement, possibly a lycophyte; a new genus for "Zosterophyllum" longa Wang (2007). | |

== Research ==
- Extensive plant traces preserved in fossil soils are described from Early Devonian deposits of Xujiachong Formation in Yunnan (China) by Xue et al. (2016), who interpret the traces as belowground rhizomes of the basal lycopsid Drepanophycus.
- A description of the rooting system preserved in basal lycophyte fossils from the Devonian Beartooth Butte Formation (Wyoming, United States) is published by Matsunaga & Tomescu (2016).
- Fossils of the fern Acrostichum lanzaeanum are described from the Oligocene La Val fossil site (Huesca Province, Spain) by Moreno-Domínguez et al. (2016), who interpret the fossils as indicating that in Oligocene Acrostichum grew and developed as a pioneering plant in disturbed environments, such as floodplain areas.
- A study on the phylogenetic relationships of Pseudoasterophyllites cretaceus is published by Kvaček et al. (2018).
- Fossil fruit of a member of the genus Cornus related to Cornus piggae is described from the Late Cretaceous (late Campanian) Spray Formation (British Columbia, Canada) by Atkinson, Stockey & Rothwell (2016).
