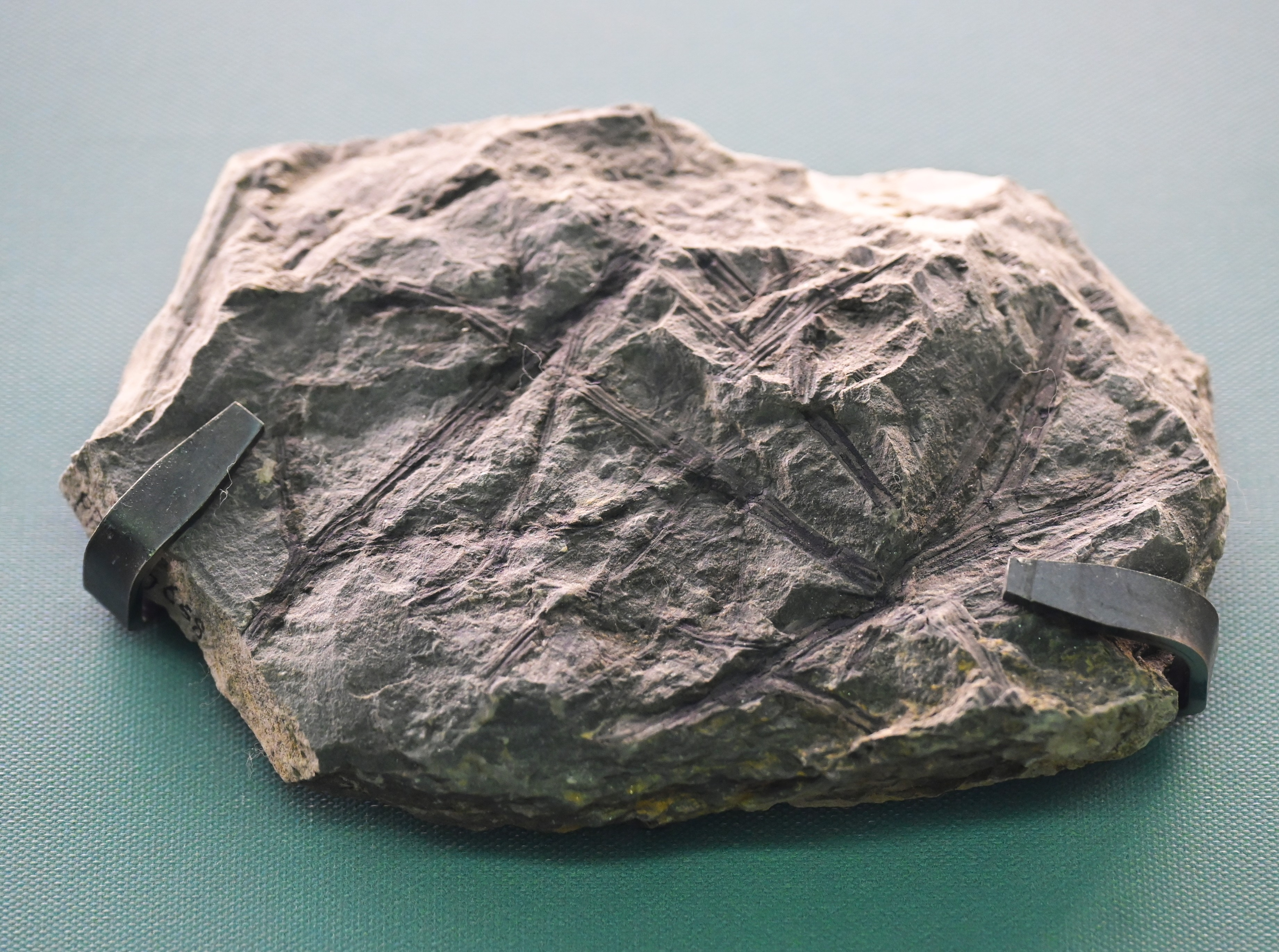
- Fossil specimen, National Natural History Museum of China

Scientific classification
- Kingdom: Plantae
- Clade: Embryophytes
- Clade: Tracheophytes
- Division: Polypodiophyta
- Class: Polypodiopsida
- Subclass: Equisetidae
- Order: †Sphenophyllales
- Genus: †Hamatophyton; L.-H. Deng, X.-X. Li, Z.-Y. Zhou, R. Xu, J.-N. Zhu, nom. inval.

Species
- See text.

= Hamatophyton =

Hamatophyton Temporal range: Famennian–Tournaisian

Extinct genus of horsetails

Hamatophyton is a genus of the extinct Sphenophyllales horsetails. Unique to this genus among other Sphenophyllales is its lack of secondary xylem around the tips of the primary xylem arms. One of its species has also been placed in the genus Sphenophyllostachys, which is regarded as a synonym of Bowmanites by the Interim Register of Marine and Nonmarine Genera.

== Taxonomy ==
The taxonomic status of the genus and its possible species is confused. As of February 2024, the International Fossil Plant Names Index regards Hamatophyton as an invalid name since its publication in 1974 because the species name on which the genus was based, Hamatophyton verticillatum, is invalid as no type was designated. In 1991, Hamatophyton verticillatum was transferred to the genus Sphenophyllostachys as Sphenophyllostachys verticillata, but since the basionym was invalid, this name is also invalid.

Both species that have been placed in Hamatophyton are also treated as synonymous with Rotafolia songziensis.

=== Species ===
- †Hamatophyton verticillatum L.-H. Deng, X.-X. Li, Z.-Y. Zhou, R. Xu, J.-N. Zhu, nom. inval., syns Sphenophyllostachys verticillata, Rotafolia songziensis
- †Hamatophyton yiduense (G.-X. Chen) S.-N. Feng, nom. inval., syns Sphenophyllum yiduense, Rotafolia songziensis
