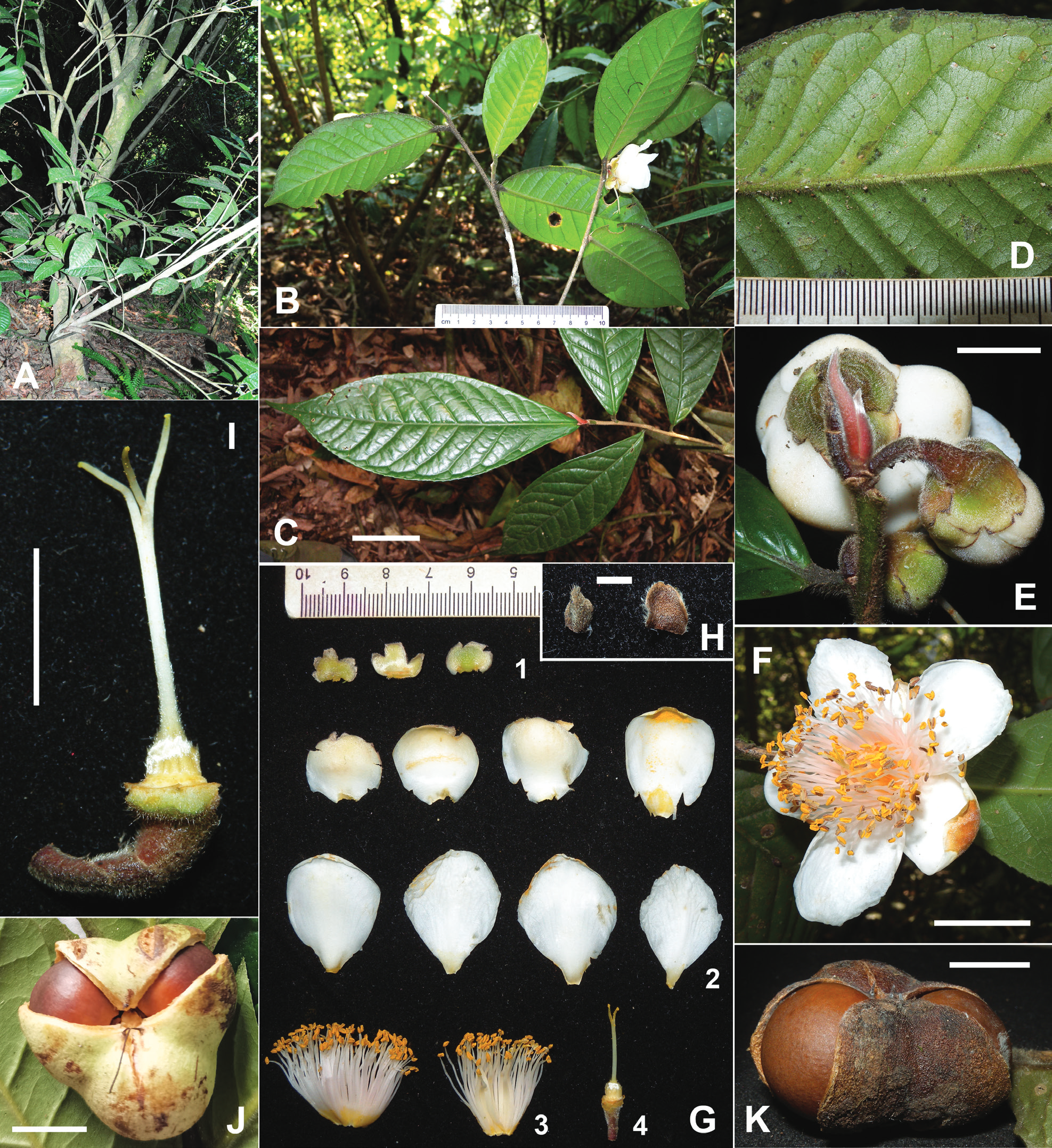

Scientific classification
- Kingdom: Plantae
- Clade: Embryophytes
- Clade: Tracheophytes
- Clade: Spermatophytes
- Clade: Angiosperms
- Clade: Eudicots
- Clade: Asterids
- Order: Ericales
- Family: Theaceae
- Genus: Camellia
- Section: Camellia sect. Thea
- Species: C. yangii

Binomial name
- Camellia yangii D.Wei Zhao

= Camellia yangii =

Species of plant

Camellia yangii, commonly known as three‑sepal tea (Chinese: 三萼茶), is a plant species in the tea group (Camellia sect. Thea) of the family Theaceae. It was first described as a new species in 2025. The species is endemic to tropical montane evergreen forests in Malipo County, Yunnan Province, China, and is named for its flower bearing only three sepals (other tea plants typically have five). With fewer than 10 mature individuals in a single population, it is an extremely endangered wild germplasm resource of tea.

== Discovery ==
Camellia yangii was discovered during field surveys from 2023 to 2024 by a team led by Dr. Dongwei Zhao of the College of Forestry, Central South University of Forestry and Technology. The discovery was published in June 2025 in the journal PhytoKeys under the title "Camellia yangii (Theaceae), a new species of tea plants (Camellia section Thea)". It is the first new species of Camellia sect. Thea discovered in the wild since the 1980s.

The type specimens were collected from a tropical montane evergreen forest at 858 m elevation in Malipo County, Yunnan. The holotype (Yang S.X. & Yin L. 7357) is deposited at the Herbarium of Kunming Institute of Botany, Chinese Academy of Sciences (KUN); isotypes are preserved at the Herbarium of Central South University of Forestry and Technology (CSFI) and at KUN.

=== Etymology ===
The specific epithet yangii honors Dr. Shixiong Yang, an expert on Theaceae at the Kunming Institute of Botany, Chinese Academy of Sciences. The Chinese name "三萼茶" (Sān è chá) directly describes the unique morphological feature – three sepals per flower, whereas other taxa in Camellia sect. Thea generally bear five sepals.

== Morphological characteristics ==
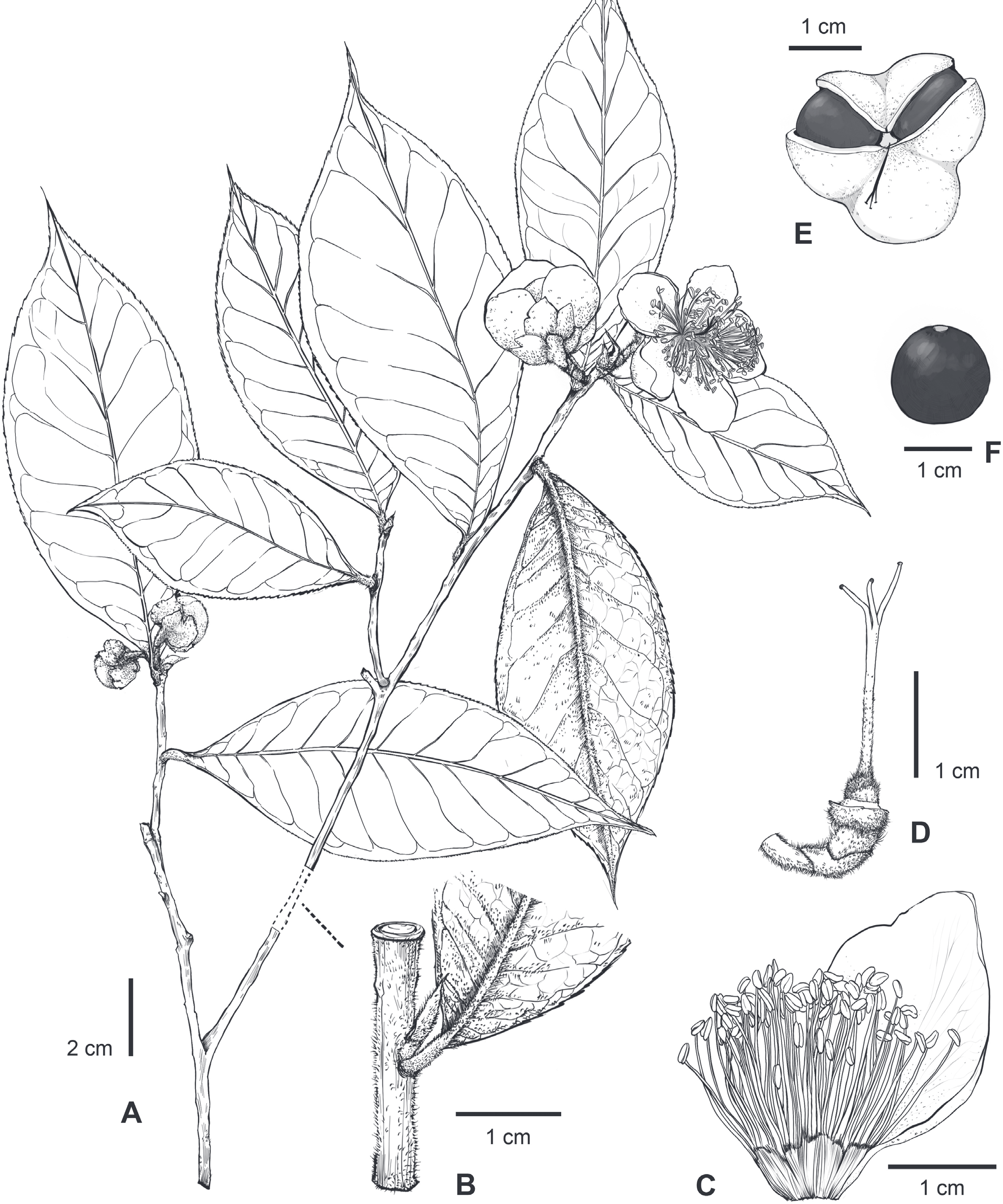
Figure 2. Illustration of Camellia yangii. A. Branchlet with flowers; B. A node of branchlet, showing the indumenta of the branchlet, leaf, and bud; C. A part of androecium and a petal; D. Pedicel, receptacle and gynoecium of a flower; E. Capsule; F. Seed. Drawn by Chen M.Q.

Evergreen shrubs or small trees, 5–8 m tall; bark grayish yellow. New branchlets densely pubescent; terminal buds red or purplish red, densely pubescent. Leaves elliptic, oblong, or obovate, 9–21 × 3.5–8.5 cm, apex acuminate, base cuneate, margin serrulate; adaxially dark green, glabrous or puberulous along midrib at base, abaxially yellowish green, densely pubescent; secondary veins 10–13 pairs, elevated abaxially and impressed adaxially; petiole 3–5 mm long, densely pubescent.

Flowers axillary, solitary or paired, 4–5.5 cm in diameter, white, the outermost petal sometimes green at apex. Pedicel 5–15 mm long, densely pubescent. Bracteoles 2, caducous, ovate, 2–3 × 2–2.5 mm. Sepals 3, persistent, suborbicular, 8–9 × 10–13 mm, abaxially pubescent, adaxially sericeous, margin ciliolate. Petals 7–8 in 1–2 whorls; outer petals pubescent or puberulous on both surfaces, inner petals puberulous at base or glabrous on both surfaces, basally adnate to filament whorl for 2–4 mm. Stamens numerous, 20–25 mm long; filaments white or slightly pink, glabrous, outer filaments basally connate for 3–5 mm. Ovary globose to ovoid, densely pubescent. Style 1, 18–22 mm long, gradually becoming glabrous upwards, apically 3‑lobed for 5–8 mm. Capsule tri‑coccal, ca. 3.5 cm in diameter, ca. 2 cm in height, 3‑loculed with 1 seed per locule; pericarp 1–2 mm thick. Seeds fuscous, globose, ca. 1.5 cm in diameter, glabrous.

=== Phenology and habit ===
Flowering in December, fruiting from August to September. The flowering phase is about one month later than that of other tea plants occurring or planted nearby. This distinct flowering period prevents natural hybridization with closely related species and supports its recognition as a distinct biological species.

=== Differentiation from similar species ===
Camellia yangii is morphologically similar to C. ptilophylla and C. fangchengensis in having densely pubescent new branchlets, abaxial leaf surfaces, and pedicels; but it differs by its larger flower, fewer and much larger sepals, and the adaxial surface of sepals sericeous. Compared with its phylogenetically closely related species (C. longissima and C. taliensis), the new species has densely pubescent vegetative organs, whereas the latter two are generally glabrous. The detailed differences are shown in the table below:

Morphological comparison of Camellia yangii and similar species
Character	C. yangii	C. fangchengensis	C. ptilophylla	C. longissima	C. taliensis
Indumentum of new branchlet	densely pubescent	densely pubescent	densely pubescent	glabrous	glabrous
Indumentum of leaf abaxial surface	densely pubescent	densely pubescent	densely pubescent	glabrous	glabrous
Diameter of flower	4–5.5 cm	2–3.5 cm	2.5–3 cm	3–4.5 cm	3–5 cm
Number of sepals	3	5	5	5	5
Size of sepals	8–9 × 10–13 mm	2.5–3.5 × 4–5 mm	3–7 × 3.5–7 mm	2.5–5 × 3–6 mm	4–6.5 × 5.5–9 mm
Indumentum of sepals (adaxial)	sericeous	glabrous	glabrous	sericeous	sericeous
Indumentum of ovary	densely pubescent	densely pubescent	densely pubescent	glabrous	pubescent

== Conservation status ==
Camellia yangii is known only from a single population in Malipo County, Yunnan, with fewer than 10 mature individuals. The population is extremely vulnerable, growing in a tropical montane evergreen broad‑leaved forest that is susceptible to overexploitation or deforestation. Based on its extremely small population size, narrow distribution, and ongoing habitat pressure, the species is considered Critically Endangered in the original paper, and urgent conservation measures – including further field surveys and ex‑situ asexual propagation (e.g., cuttings) – are recommended to avoid extinction.

In China, all species of Camellia sect. Thea were added to the National Key Protected Wild Plants List (Class II) in 2021. As a member of this section, C. yangii automatically receives that protection level.
