= Camellia nanningensis =

Camellia nanningensis Temporal range: Late Oligocene 28–23 Ma

Scientific classification
- Kingdom: Plantae
- Clade: Embryophytes
- Clade: Tracheophytes
- Clade: Spermatophytes
- Clade: Angiosperms
- Clade: Eudicots
- Clade: Asterids
- Order: Ericales
- Family: Theaceae
- Genus: Camellia
- Species: †C. nanningensis

Binomial name
- †Camellia nanningensis Huang, Jin, Quan & Oskolski, 2016

Extinct species of Camellia

†Camellia nanningensis (Chinese: 南宁古茶) is an extinct species of Camellia. Its mummified wood was discovered in the Yongning Formation (upper Oligocene) of the Nanning Basin, Guangxi Zhuang Autonomous Region, China. It represents the oldest known fossil wood of the genus Camellia in East Asia, and is one of the first reliable fossil records of the family Theaceae from China.

== Discovery and geological age ==
The holotype (specimen number NNW006) and paratype (NNW008) of Camellia nanningensis were collected from the upper part of the upper Oligocene Yongning Formation near Santang Town, Xingning District, Nanning City. This lithological unit consists mainly of bluish‑gray clayey mudstone, interbedded with a few coal seams and thin sandstones. Mammalian fossils (e.g., Anthracotherium changlingensis and Anthracokeryx kwangsiensis) found in the same horizon indicate a late Oligocene age (ca. 28–23 Ma). The exceptional preservation of these fossil woods as mummified remains is attributed to rapid burial in oxygen‑deficient clayey muds following floods, which allowed sectioning using modern wood anatomical methods.

== Morphological characteristics ==
The wood of C. nanningensis is diffuse‑porous with indistinct growth rings. Vessel lumina are very numerous (120–230 per mm²) and extremely small, with tangential diameters up to 41 μm. Perforation plates are exclusively scalariform, bearing 7–23 bars. Intervessel pits are scalariform, occasionally transitional to opposite or alternate. Fibers are non‑septate and possess distinctly bordered pits. Axial parenchyma is diffuse, diffuse‑in‑aggregates, and scantily paratracheal. Rays are 1–2(3)-seriate, heterocellular, with 1–5 (up to 10) marginal rows of square and upright cells, and occasionally have equally wide multiseriate and uniseriate portions. Vessel‑ray pits are scalariform with much reduced borders to simple. Crystals are absent in both axial parenchyma and ray cells.

== Taxonomy ==
Based on the combination of anatomical features (very narrow vessels, exclusively scalariform perforation plates, narrow rays, and absence of crystals), this fossil is assigned to the genus Camellia and shows the closest affinity to Group III of extant Camellia species, which includes C. sinensis (the tea plant) and C. taliensis.

Compared with other extinct Theaceae fossils, C. nanningensis differs from Camellia japonoxyla (which has crystals in ray cells), Ternstroemioxylon adenorfense (which possesses exclusively paratracheal parenchyma), and species of Schimoxylon by its vessel tangential diameter (< 40 μm) and fewer bars on scalariform perforation plates (< 23 bars).

== Paleoecology ==
The wood anatomy of C. nanningensis (very numerous and extremely narrow vessels, scalariform perforation plates) indicates a warm and humid subtropical to tropical environment, consistent with the broadleaved evergreen forests that prevailed in the Nanning Basin during the late Oligocene. This discovery demonstrates that plants highly similar to modern Camellia had already appeared in South China – the present‑day diversity center of the genus – by at least the late Oligocene.

== Significance in the debate on tea plant origin ==
In refuting the hypothesis that "the tea plant originated from the Tertiary broad-leaved magnolia (Magnolia latifolia)", researcher Yang Shixiong of the Kunming Institute of Botany, Chinese Academy of Sciences, cited Camellia nanningensis as a key piece of evidence. Yang pointed out that fossils of Theaceae have been known since the Late Cretaceous of the Mesozoic, long before the Tertiary Magnolia latifolia and Magnolia mioecnica.

Yang further argued that in Asia, reliable fossil records of the genus Camellia include C. abensis from the late Eocene of Japan, the late Oligocene C. nanningensis from Nanning, and C. kueishanensis (Guishan tea) from the early Miocene of Taiwan. C. nanningensis and Magnolia latifolia both lived in the Oligocene and belong to the same geological period, therefore the latter cannot be the ancestor of the former; they must have evolved in parallel from their own older ancestors. Yang argued that the origin of the tea plant should be investigated primarily through fossils of the genus Camellia and the family Theaceae, rather than by direct comparison of living tea plants with fossils of another, distantly related family.

Yang further discussed the anatomical evidence of C. nanningensis and C. kueishanensis in his paper. He pointed out that the wood anatomy of C. nanningensis supports its placement in Group III of Camellia wood anatomy, a group dominated by species of sect. Thea, sect. Theopsis, and sect. Eriandra. C. kueishanensis is particularly similar to modern C. sinensis in ray width and the absence of helical thickenings in vessels. C. nanningensis exhibits rays with equally wide multiseriate and uniseriate portions, a feature previously reported only in C. sinensis, C. subacutissima, and C. taliensis, confirming its anatomical affinity to Group III. Based on these observations, Yang considered C. nanningensis and C. kueishanensis as "the most reliable and most ancient fossil plants with the closest affinity to the tea-plant group (sect. Thea) so far reported".
