= Cryptophyte =

Cryptophyte may refer to:

- a plant which survives the unfavorable season underground or underwater in the Raunkiær plant life-form classification
- cryptomonad, or cryptophyte, a single-celled organism of the superclass Cryptomonada, most of which are photosynthetic
- Cryptophyceae, a class of cryptomonads
- fossil plants that produced cryptospores
