= Philippe Steemans =

Belgian geologist researcher (born 1958)

- Born: 1958 (age 67–68)
- Education: University of Liège
- Scientific career
- Fields: Palaeozoic palynology Geology
- Workplaces: NFSR at the University of Liège
- Website: philippesteemans.academia.edu

Philippe Steemans (born 1958) is a Belgian geologist researcher, best known for his work on palynology. As a Senior Researcher of the National Fund for Scientific Research (NFSR) at the University of Liège, Belgium, in the Department of Geology, Steemans studies fossilised spores from Palaeozoic, mainly from their first occurrence in the Ordovician (or possibly Cambrian) up to the Devonian.

== Early life and education ==
Steemans was educated at the Athénée Royal de l'Air Pur located at Seraing, Belgium, from 1963 up to 1976 and at the University of Liège in Belgium where he earned a BS (1980) and a PhD (1986) in Geology and Palynology. He is living at Anthisnes, a small village not far from the University of Liège.

== Career and impact ==
After completing his Ph.D. in 1986, Steemans worked in applied geology at the S.A. Carmeuse which extracts limestone in quarries from Belgium and from other countries. Since 1990 he was appointed NFSR Associated Researcher at the University of Liège and since 2009 he is NFSR Senior Researcher. Steemans is a palynologist and has played a key role in expanding our understanding of first miospore evolution and the terrestrialisation of land plants. He has provided evidence for the first undoubted cryptospores in the Ordovician in Argentina. Later, he has discovered the first trilete spores in the Late Ordovician in Saudi Arabia demonstrating the possible first appearance of vascular land plant much earlier than previously believed. Much earlier he had established a detailed biostratigraphic scale based on trilete spores for the Lower Devonian still universally used. Steemans has focused mainly his research on systematics of spores, biostratigraphy, palaeoecology and palaeophytogeography. Recently (2017) he has been involved in a team who has analysed minerals included in leiospheres from the Emsian of Saudi Arabia. Novel methods for discriminating biological from nonbiological chemistries of microfossil-like structures are of the utmost importance in the search for evidence of early life on Earth. This, too, is important for the search for life on Mars by in situ analyses via rovers or sample return missions for future analysis here on Earth

In addition to conducting fundamental research in Palaeozoic palynology, he is also working on applied palynology as expert in miospore for petroleum societies like Totalfina, Petrobras, Saudi Aramco etc.

== Awards and honors ==
- Jun 1991 – Prix du Président André Leroux des « Amis de l'Université de liège ». Belgique.
- Dec 1990 – Prix Diplôme Baron van Ertbom de l'Académie royale des Sciences de Belgique.
- Sep 1982 – Bourse et Diplôme L.R. Wilson de l’American Association of Stratigraphic Palynologists (AASP), Dublin, Ireland.
- Jun 1982 – Bourse et Médaille Clément Guion de l'Université de Liège, Belgique.
- Oct 1980 – Fonds de la Recherche Industrielle et Académique (FRIA), Belgique.

== Selected works (the 15 most cited in the literature) ==
- Bultynck, P., Coen-Aubert, M., Dejonghe, L., Godefroid, J., Hance, L., Lacroix, D., Préat, A., Stainier, P., Steemans, P., Streel, M., Tourneur, F., 1991. Les Formations du Dévonien moyen de la Belgique. Bruxelles: Service Géologique de Belgique.
- Gerrienne, P., Bergamaschi, S., Pereira, E., Rodrigues, M.A.C., Steemans, P., 2001. An Early Devonian flora, including Cooksonia from the Paraná Basin (Brazil), in: Gerrienne, P. (Ed.), Early land plants evolution and diversification. Amsterdam: Review of Palaeobotany and Palynology, 19-38.
- Gerrienne, P., Gensel, P.G., Strullu-Derrien, C., Lardeux, H., Steemans, P., Prestianni, C., 2011. A simple type wood in two early Devonian plants. Science 333, 837.
- Gerrienne, P., Meyer-Berthaud, B., Fairon-Demaret, M., Streel, M., Steemans, P., 2004. Runcaria, a Middle Devonian seed plant precursor. Science 306, 856-858.
- Godefroid, J., Blieck, A., Bultynck, P., Dejonghe, L., Gerrienne, P., Hance, L., Meilliez, F., Stainier, P., Steemans, P., 1994. Les formations du Dévonien inférieur du Massif de la Vesdre, de la Fenêtre de Theux et du Synclinorium de Dinant (Belgique, France). Bruxelles: Service géologique de Belgique.
- Richardson, J.B., Streel, M., Hassan, A., Steemans, P., 1982. A new spore assemblage to correlate between the Breconian (British Isles) and the Gedinnian (Belgium). Ann. Soc. géol. Belgique 105, 135-143.
- Rubinstein, C.V., Gerrienne, P., De La Puente, G.S., Astini, R.A., Steemans, P., 2010. Early Middle Ordovician evidence for land plants in Argentina (eastern Gondwana). New Phytologist 188, 365-369.
- Rubinstein, C.V., Melo, J.H.G., Steemans, P., 2005. Lochkovian (earliest Devonian) miospores from the Solimões Basin, northern Brazil. Rev. Palaeobot. Palynol. 133, 91-113.
- Rubinstein, C.V., Steemans, P., 2002. Miospore assemblages from the Silurian-Devonian boundary, in borehole A1-61, Ghadamis Basin, Libya, in: Steemans, P., Servais, T., Streel, M. (Eds.), Paleozoïc Palynology: a special issue in honour of Dr. Stanislas Loboziak. Amsterdam: Review of Palaeobotany and Palynology, 397-421.
- Steemans, P., 1989. Palynostratigraphie de l'Eodévonien dans l'ouest de l'Europe. Bruxelles: Service Géologique de Belgique.
- Steemans, P., 2000. Miospore evolution from the Ordovician to the Silurian. Rev. Palaeobot. Palynol. 113, 189-196.
- Steemans, P., Le Hérissé, A., Bozdogan, N., 1996. Ordovician and Silurian cryptospores and miospores from Southeastern Turkey. Rev. Palaeobot. Palynol. 93, 35-76.
- Steemans, P., Le Herisse, A., Melvin, J., Miller, M.A., Paris, F., Verniers, J., Wellman, C.H., 2009. Origin and radiation of the earliest vascular land plants. Science 324, 353.
- Steemans, P., Lepot, K., Marshall, C.P., Le Hérissé, A., Javaux, E.J., 2010. FTIR characterisation of the chemical composition of Silurian miospores (cryptospores and trilete spores) from Gotland, Sweden. Rev. Palaeobot. Palynol. 162, 577-590.
- Streel, M., Higgs, K.T., Loboziak, S., Riegel, W., Steemans, P., 1987. Spore stratigraphy and correlation with faunas and floras in the type marine Devonian of the Ardenno-Rhenish regions. Rev. Palaeobot. Palynol. 50, 211-229.
