= Lunania cubensis =

Conservation status
- Least Concern (IUCN 3.1)

Scientific classification
- Kingdom: Plantae
- Clade: Tracheophytes
- Clade: Angiosperms
- Clade: Eudicots
- Clade: Rosids
- Order: Malpighiales
- Family: Salicaceae
- Genus: Lunania
- Species: L. cubensis

Binomial name
- Lunania cubensis Turcz.

Synonyms
- Lunania grayi Griseb.

Species of flowering plant

Lunania cubensis, colloquially known as Cueriduro, is a species of flowering plant in the family Salicaceae.

The plant grows in montane pluvial forests in southern Cuba in the provinces of Holguín, Granma, Guantánamo, and Santiago de Cuba at elevations of 600–1,100 m (2,000–3,600 ft).

Lunania cubensis was first described by Nikolai Turczaninow in 1854.

== Description ==
Lunania cubensis is a tree reaching up to 10.0 m (32.8 ft) in height, characterized by glabrous branchlets. Its leaves range from oblong to elliptic-oblong, and more rarely elliptic or obovate-elliptic, with an apex that is broadly attenuate or obtuse to rounded, and a base that is very broadly attenuate to rounded. The leaves are chartaceous to subcoriaceous, infrequently firmly so, and glabrous, with margins that are often slightly revolute, undulate, or subentire. The leaves measure 5.0–8.0 cm (2.0–3.1 in) in length and 2.5–4.0 cm (0.98–1.57 in) in width. They are 3-nerved from the base, with the pair of lateral nerves ascending approximately half the length of the lamina, and are prominent on both faces. Other higher lateral nerves are shorter, curved-ascending, and looping within the margin in 2–3 pairs, also prominent on both faces. The veins are transverse to rather oblique, forming a slightly raised lax reticulation on both faces, mainly beneath. The petiole is 6.0–10.0 mm (0.24–0.39 in) long. The racemes are axillary or subterminal, solitary, and measure 10.0–20.0 cm (3.9–7.9 in) long including the peduncle, which measures 5.0–6.0 cm (2.0–2.4 in). The rachis and pedicels (2.0 mm (0.079 in)) are finely yellowish-puberulous, and the bracts are ovate, scarious, and minute. The calyx lobes are 2 in number, ovate to oblong-ovate, reflexed, and glabrous, measuring 2.0–3.0 mm (0.079–0.118 in) in length. The stamens range from 6–8 in number, with filaments 2.0 mm (0.079 in) long and anthers 1.0 mm (0.039 in) long. The disk is 1.0 mm (0.039 in) high. The ovary is ovoid-conical and glabrous, with a thick style 1.0 mm (0.039 in) long and a subobtuse stigma that is barely 3-lobed. The fruit is globose-subtrigonous, with numerous, angular, shiny seeds measuring 1.0 mm (0.039 in) long; the testa is foveolate.

== Conservation status ==
The entire distribution of Lunania cubensis is confined to protected areas, guaranteeing the long-term preservation of the species. Specific localities cannot be delineated, though in some regions, the habitat has experienced degradation in quality. Despite this, the species is listed as LC by the IUCN Red List. It is affected in some places by forestry and invasive plants.
