= Hamatophyton verticillatum =

Hamatophyton verticillatum Temporal range: Famennian–Tournaisian

Scientific classification
- Kingdom: Plantae
- Clade: Tracheophytes
- Division: Polypodiophyta
- Class: Polypodiopsida
- Subclass: Equisetidae
- Order: †Sphenophyllales
- Genus: †Hamatophyton
- Species: †H. verticillatum

Binomial name
- †Hamatophyton verticillatum L.-H. Deng, X.-X. Li, Z.-Y. Zhou, R. Xu, J.-N. Zhu, nom. inval.

Synonyms
- Sphenophyllostachys verticillata (L.-H. Deng, X.-X. Li, Z.-Y. Zhou, R. Xu, J.-N. Zhu) S.-N. Feng, J. Ma, nom. inval.

Extinct species of horsetail

Hamatophyton verticillatum is a species of the extinct Sphenophyllales horsetails.

== Description ==
Axes of this plant are pseudomonopodial with axial trichomes or spines and nodal whorls of sterile leaves. Leaves are dimorphic and sometimes contain trichomes or spines. When mature, primary xylem is exarch and the secondary xylem lacks parenchyma.
