= Ekrixanthera hispaniolae =

Scientific classification
- Kingdom: Plantae
- Clade: Tracheophytes
- Clade: Angiosperms
- Clade: Eudicots
- Clade: Rosids
- Order: Rosales
- Family: Urticaceae
- Genus: †Ekrixanthera
- Species: †E. hispaniolae

Binomial name
- †Ekrixanthera hispaniolae Poinar, Kevan & Jackes (2021), nom. inval.

Extinct species of flowering plant

Ekrixanthera hispaniolae is a species of extinct plant first described from fossilised flowers from Dominican amber. It has staminate flowers on short pedicels that are pentamerous, with a pilose pistillode, plus heteromorphic pilose tepals. Differentiating it from Ekrixanthera ehecatli are the presence or absence of a pedicel, the heterotrophic tepals, and the presence or absence of pilosity of its pistillode and tepals. Additionally, the latter characters added to the pentamerous flowers separate the two fossil species from extant genera. Its floral structures indicate an explosive manner of pollen release as well as anemophily. Lepidopterans feeding on this species is suspected during the mid-Tertiary.

The name first appeared in a publication in 2016, but was not validly published under the International Code of Nomenclature for algae, fungi, and plants. A correction was published online in 2021. As of April 2024, the correction was not accepted by the International Fossil Plant Names Index, as the publication of the genus name gave two type species.
