= Rotafolia =

Scientific classification
- Kingdom: Plantae
- Clade: Tracheophytes
- Division: Polypodiophyta
- Class: Polypodiopsida
- Subclass: Equisetidae
- Order: †Sphenophyllales
- Genus: †Rotafolia; De-M. Wang, S.-G. Hao, Q. Wang (2005)
- Species: †R. songziensis

Binomial name
- †Rotafolia songziensis (S.-N. Feng) De-M. Wang, S.-G. Hao, Q. Wang (2005)

Extinct genus of vascular plants

Rotafolia is a genus of the extinct Sphenophyllales horsetails. The species Rotafolia songziensis was first described as Bowmanites songziensis in 1984, based on a fossilized strobilus, and transferred to the new genus Rotafolia in 2005.

== Description ==
Rotafolia songziensis is similar to Hamatophyton verticillatum and is found in the Xiejingsi Formation. R. songziensis consists of branched axes, up to 20 cm long, which have slightly swollen nodes and internodes with ribs and narrow branches produced from the nodes. The axes are protostelic. Cross sections show a roughly triangular or quadrangular organization of the primary xylem and radial arrangement of the secondary xylem. Primary xylem is exarch upon maturation, with protoxylem strands positioned around the tips of the primary xylem arms. No differentiation between fascicular and interfascicular regions of the secondary xylem is apparent, and ray cells are rarely observed. Protoxylem tracheids have helical wall thickenings, whereas the tracheids of meta- and secondary xylem possess scalariform and/or bordered pits. All R. songziensis axes bear trichomes or spines, some up to 2.8 mm long. At the nodes are whorls of six leaves, up to 2.4 cm long, that regularly or irregularly fork two to four times. The leaves are positioned perpendicular to the axis in proximal portions of the plant but inserted at acute angles in distal portions. Fertile branches are produced in a terminal strobilus (8.5 cm long), which is subtended by whorls of normally developed leaves. It consists of a central axis and up to 16 whorls of fertile units, each of which consists of a bract and 6-10 sporangia. The bracts are elongate-cuneate and have prominent marginal fringes; sporangia are attached to the abaxial surface at the base of each bract. Although R. songziensis closely resembles H. verticillatum with its external axis morphology, leaf shape, and structure of the primary xylem. However, the two forms differ in strobilus morphology.
