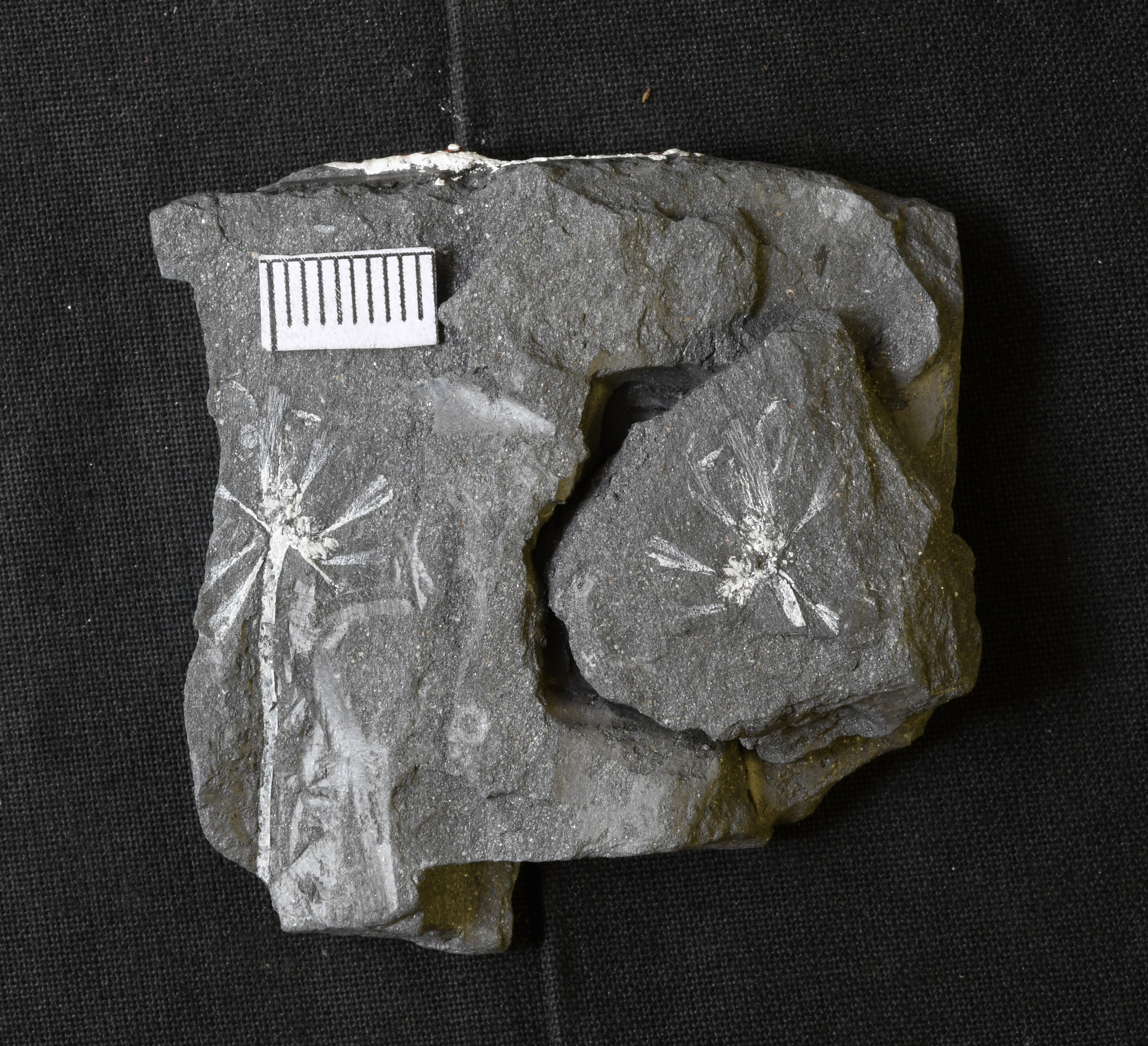
- Specimen showing the whorl with preserved leaves

Scientific classification
- Kingdom: Plantae
- Clade: Embryophytes
- Clade: Tracheophytes
- Division: Polypodiophyta
- Class: Polypodiopsida
- Subclass: Equisetidae
- Order: †Sphenophyllales
- Genus: †Rinistachya; Prestianni & Gess, 2019
- Species: †R. hilleri

Binomial name
- †Rinistachya hilleri Prestianni & Gess, 2019

= Rinistachya =

Genus of Late Devonian Sphenopsid

Rinistachya is a genus of Late Devonian sphenopsid, currently containing one species, Rinistachya hilleri. It comprises the only sphenopsid as yet known from the Devonian of Gondwana, and is currently known from only a small number of specimens collected from the main fish layer/lens (MFL) black shale within the Witpoort Formation (Witteberg Formation, Cape Supergroup) at Waterloo Farm, Makhanda. It is currently interpreted as a small-sized herbaceous plant. and 'exhibits a novel architecture' that includes apparently plesiomorphic characters, reminiscent of the organisation of the Iridopteridales (including the production of two types of laterals at one node, the location of fertile parts in loose whorls on lateral branches and an organisation of the fertile parts in which they branch several times before bearing distally elongate sporangia). Other characters unambiguously nest Rinistachya within the Sphenopsida (including presence of planate and slightly webbed ultimate appendages and lateral strobili made of successive whorls of fertile leaves with fertile parts located at their axil). This provides strong support for a close relationship between Sphenopsida and Iridopteridales. It is the only known high latitude sphenopsid known from the Devonian, the only other 3 genera, Eviostachya, Hamatophyton and Rotafolia being of palaeotropical provenance.

== Description ==
The main stem is approximately 80 mm long and consists of a succession of nodes and internodes. From the examined material, the stem was characteristically slightly wider at the nodes and of the number of nodes observed, only one was well preserved. Internodes range from 0.9 to 1.2 mm in width with the longest being 40 mm. Fertile nodes are inserted in whorls of up to three axes at each node. These fertile nodes are between 0.4 and 0.5 mm in width. Each node has a whorl of leaves inserted together with a whorl of fertile parts. In well preserved parts of the specimens, fertile leaves are linear in shape and appear to be divided approximately two-thirds of their total length. Fertile leaves are weakly recurved on the inside of the leaves and are approximately 10 mm long.

== Etymology ==
The genus name is derived from an isiXhosa name for the Makhanda city (former Grahamstown) while stáchya is a plural form of the Greek word “stáchys” referring to spikes. The species epithet hilleri is in honour of Professor Norton Hiller in recognition of his role as the original supervisor of Dr Gess’ excavations at Waterloo Farm.
