= Lunania dodecandra =

Conservation status
- Endangered (IUCN 3.1)

Scientific classification
- Kingdom: Plantae
- Clade: Tracheophytes
- Clade: Angiosperms
- Clade: Eudicots
- Clade: Rosids
- Order: Malpighiales
- Family: Salicaceae
- Genus: Lunania
- Species: L. dodecandra

Binomial name
- Lunania dodecandra C.Wright ex Griseb.

Species of flowering plant

Lunania dodecandra is a species of flowering plant in the family Salicaceae. It is a tree endemic to Cuba.
