= Ekrixanthera =

Scientific classification
- Kingdom: Plantae
- Clade: Tracheophytes
- Clade: Angiosperms
- Clade: Eudicots
- Clade: Rosids
- Order: Rosales
- Family: Urticaceae
- Tribe: Boehmerieae
- Genus: †Ekrixanthera; Poinar, Kevan & Jackes (2021), nom. inval.

Species
- See text.

Extinct genus of plants

Ekrixanthera is a genus of extinct plants in the family Urticaceae, tribe Boehmerieae, first described from fossilized flowers from amber. Two species were described:

- Ekrixanthera ehecatli
- Ekrixanthera hispaniolae

The genus and species names first appeared in a publication in 2016, but were not validly published under the International Code of Nomenclature for algae, fungi, and plants. A correction was published online in 2021. As of April 2024, the correction was not accepted by the International Fossil Plant Names Index, as the publication of the genus name gave two type species.
