= Lunania elongata =

Conservation status
- Endangered (IUCN 2.3)

Scientific classification
- Kingdom: Plantae
- Clade: Tracheophytes
- Clade: Angiosperms
- Clade: Eudicots
- Clade: Rosids
- Order: Malpighiales
- Family: Salicaceae
- Genus: Lunania
- Species: L. elongata

Binomial name
- Lunania elongata Britton & P. Wilson

Species of flowering plant

Lunania elongata is a species of flowering plant in the family Salicaceae. It is mostly found in Guamuhaya Massif, Sancti Spiritus province, endemic to Cuba. It is threatened by habitat loss.

It is an uncommon shrub or a small tree, as it is endangered due to cutting, logging, etc. It is confined to montane forest, and is rare.
