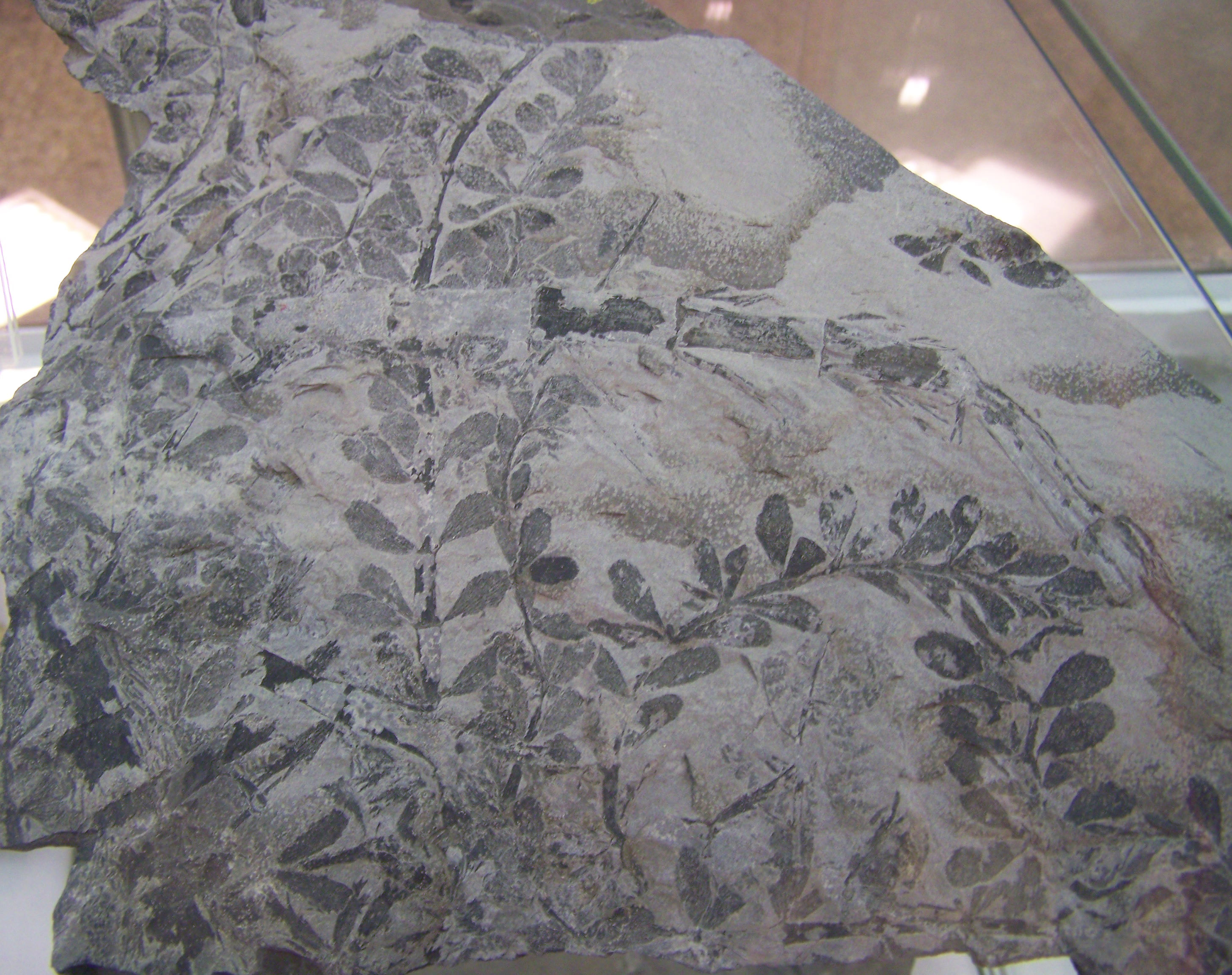
- Fossil leaves and branches of the species Sphenophyllum miravallis, Upper Carboniferous. Collection of Utrecht University

Scientific classification
- Kingdom: Plantae
- Clade: Tracheophytes
- Division: Polypodiophyta
- Class: Polypodiopsida
- Subclass: Equisetidae
- Order: †Sphenophyllales
- Family: †Sphenophyllaceae
- Genus: †Sphenophyllum; Brongn. (1828)

Species
- See text.

= Sphenophyllum =

Sphenophyllum Temporal range: Devonian–Triassic

Extinct genus of ferns

Sphenophyllum is a genus in the order Sphenophyllales. It has been placed in the family Sphenophyllaceae.

== Species ==
Species that have been described include:

- †Sphenophyllum angustifolium
- †Sphenophyllum biarmicum Zalessky (1937)
- †Sphenophyllum changxingense
- †Sphenophyllum churulianum Ashw. K. Srivast. & Rigby (1963)
- †Sphenophyllum costae
- †Sphenophyllum crenulatumAshw. K. Srivast. & Rigby (1963)
- †Sphenophyllum cuneifolium (Sternb.) Zeiller (1878)
- †Sphenophyllum elongatum Rassk. (1961)
- †Sphenophyllum emarginatum Brongn. (1822) (type species)
- †Sphenophyllum fanwanense
- †Sphenophyllum gilmorei C.D. White (1929)
- †Sphenophyllum gondwanensis
- †Sphenophyllum guangzhuoense, nomen nudum
- †Sphenophyllum koboense
- †Sphenophyllum latifolium Fontaine & I.C. White (1880)
- †Sphenophyllum longifolium (Germar) Gutbier (1843)
- †Sphenophyllum lungtanense
- †Sphenophyllum majus Bronn (1834)
- †Sphenophyllum miravallis Vetter
- †Sphenophyllum oblongifolium (Germar) Unger (1850)
- †Sphenophyllum paranaense O. Rösler & Rohn (1984)
- †Sphenophyllum pseudotenerrimum Sze (1936)
- †Sphenophyllum radiatum Unger (1850)
- †Sphenophyllum rhodesii
- †Sphenophyllum rotundatum T. Halle (1927)
- †Sphenophyllum schlotheimii Brongn. (1828)
- †Sphenophyllum sino-coreanum H. Yabe (1922)
- †Sphenophyllum stoukenbergi Schmalh. (1887)
- †Sphenophyllum subtenerrimum Nath. (1902)
- †Sphenophyllum tenuifolium Fontaine & I.C. White (1880)
- †Sphenophyllum thonii Mahr (1868)
- †Sphenophyllum utkalensis
- †Sphenophyllum verticillatum
- †Sphenophyllum zwickaviense
