= Lunania racemosa =

Conservation status
- Vulnerable (IUCN 2.3)

Scientific classification
- Kingdom: Plantae
- Clade: Tracheophytes
- Clade: Angiosperms
- Clade: Eudicots
- Clade: Rosids
- Order: Malpighiales
- Family: Salicaceae
- Genus: Lunania
- Species: L. racemosa

Binomial name
- Lunania racemosa Hook.

Species of flowering plant

Lunania racemosa is a species of flowering plant in the family Salicaceae. It is the type species of its genus, Lunania.

The plant is endemic to Jamaica in the parishes of Saint Ann, Saint Mary, and Saint Thomas in woodlands at altitudes of 500–600 m (1,600–2,000 ft).

Lunania racemosa was first described by William Jackson Hooker in 1844.

== Description ==
Lunania racemosa is a tree that reaches a height of 8.0–16.0 m (26.2–52.5 ft). Branchlets are slender with tips that are subglabrous; older parts quickly covered with grayish cork. Leaves are ovate in shape with a short-acuminate apex and an acute tip. The base is often oblique, ranging from rounded to subcordate. They are membranaceous to chartaceous in texture, entire and glabrous, measuring 6.0–10.0 cm (2.4–3.9 in) long and 5.0–7.5 m (16.4–24.6 ft) broad. Leaves are five-nerved from the base, with the outer pair of nerves being less obvious and shorter, while the inner ones are marked and extend nearly to the top of the lamina. These are prominent underneath, with one or two additional pairs of lateral nerves originating from the upper third of the midrib. The transverse veins partly loop with them and the outer pair of basal nerves, which are slightly raised underneath. Veinlets are rather obscure. The petiole measures 1.0–1.5 cm (0.39–0.59 in) long. Racemes are terminal, solitary, usually forked from below, and pendulous. They are about 30.0 cm (11.8 in) long including the peduncle (5.0–7.0 cm (2.0–2.8 in)). The rachis is robust (1.0–2.0 mm (0.039–0.079 in) in diameter), finely puberulous or subglabrous. Flowers are subdensely arranged along the rachis and chestnut-brown in color. The pedicels are subglabrous, measuring 1.5 mm (0.059 in) long, with subtending bracts and bracteoles that are subulate, squamiform, minute, and subpersistent. The calyx splits into 2 lobes which are ovate-oblong and glabrous dorsally, membranaceous, and approximately 3.0 mm (0.12 in) long. Stamens number six to nine, with filiform filaments that are 1.5–1.8 mm (0.059–0.071 in) long; anthers are oblong. The disk is subglabrous, 1.8 mm (0.071 in) high. The ovary is piriform (pear-shaped) and subglabrous, tapering to a robust style measuring 1.0–1.5 mm (0.039–0.059 in) long; stigmas number three or four and are very short and capitellate. The fruit is depressed-obovoid and subtrigonous, brown, crowned by the style and splitting into three valves, approximately 1.0 cm (0.39 in) in diameter. Seeds are numerous, ellipsoid, and 2.5 mm (0.098 in) long.

== Conservation status ==
Lunania racemosa is listed as VU by the IUCN Red List. Threats include agriculture and aquaculture, logging, and habitat loss. Almost all forests in Saint Thomas Parish have been removed or severely degraded.
