= Lunania polydactyla =

Conservation status
- Vulnerable (IUCN 2.3)

Scientific classification
- Kingdom: Plantae
- Clade: Tracheophytes
- Clade: Angiosperms
- Clade: Eudicots
- Clade: Rosids
- Order: Malpighiales
- Family: Salicaceae
- Genus: Lunania
- Species: L. polydactyla

Binomial name
- Lunania polydactyla Urban

Species of flowering plant

Lunania polydactyla is a species of flowering plant in the family Salicaceaey. It is endemic to Jamaica. It is threatened by habitat loss.
