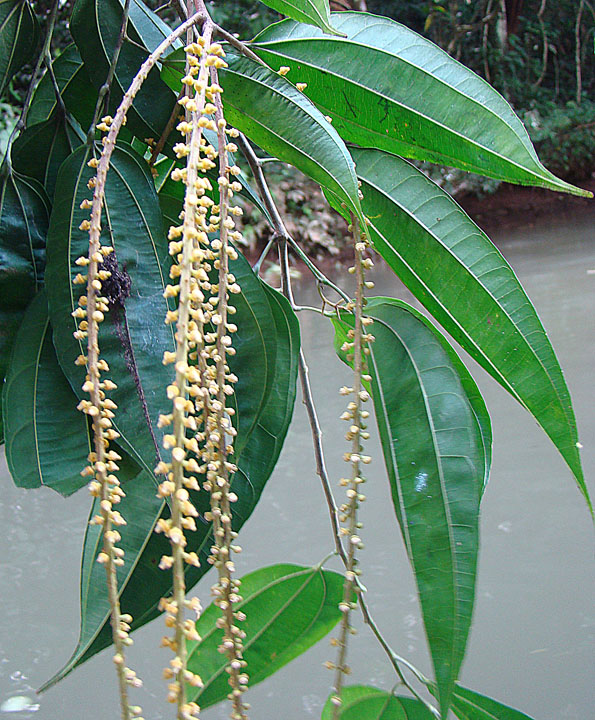
- Lunania parviflora

Scientific classification
- Kingdom: Plantae
- Clade: Tracheophytes
- Clade: Angiosperms
- Clade: Eudicots
- Clade: Rosids
- Order: Malpighiales
- Family: Salicaceae
- Subfamily: Samydoideae
- Genus: Lunania; Hook.

Type species
- Lunania racemosa Hook.

Species
- 15; see text

Synonyms
- Symbryon Griseb.

= Lunania =

Genus of flowering plants in the family Salicaceae

Lunania is a neotropical genus of flowering plants in the family Salicaceae.

The genus spans from southern Mexico to central South America and throughout the Caribbean. They typically grow as shrubs or trees.

== Known species ==
The following species are accepted by Plants of the World Online:

- Lunania cubensis Turcz.
- Lunania dentata Urb.
- Lunania divaricata Benth.
- Lunania dodecandra C.Wright ex Griseb.
- Lunania ekmanii Urb.
- Lunania elongata Britton & P.Wilson
- Lunania mauritii Urb.
- Lunania mexicana Brandegee
- Lunania parviflora Spruce ex Benth.
- Lunania polydactyla Urb.
- Lunania racemosa Hook.
- Lunania sauvallei Griseb.
- Lunania scopulorum Urb. & Ekman
- Lunania subcoriacea Britton & P.Wilson
- Lunania tenuifolia Urb. & Ekman
