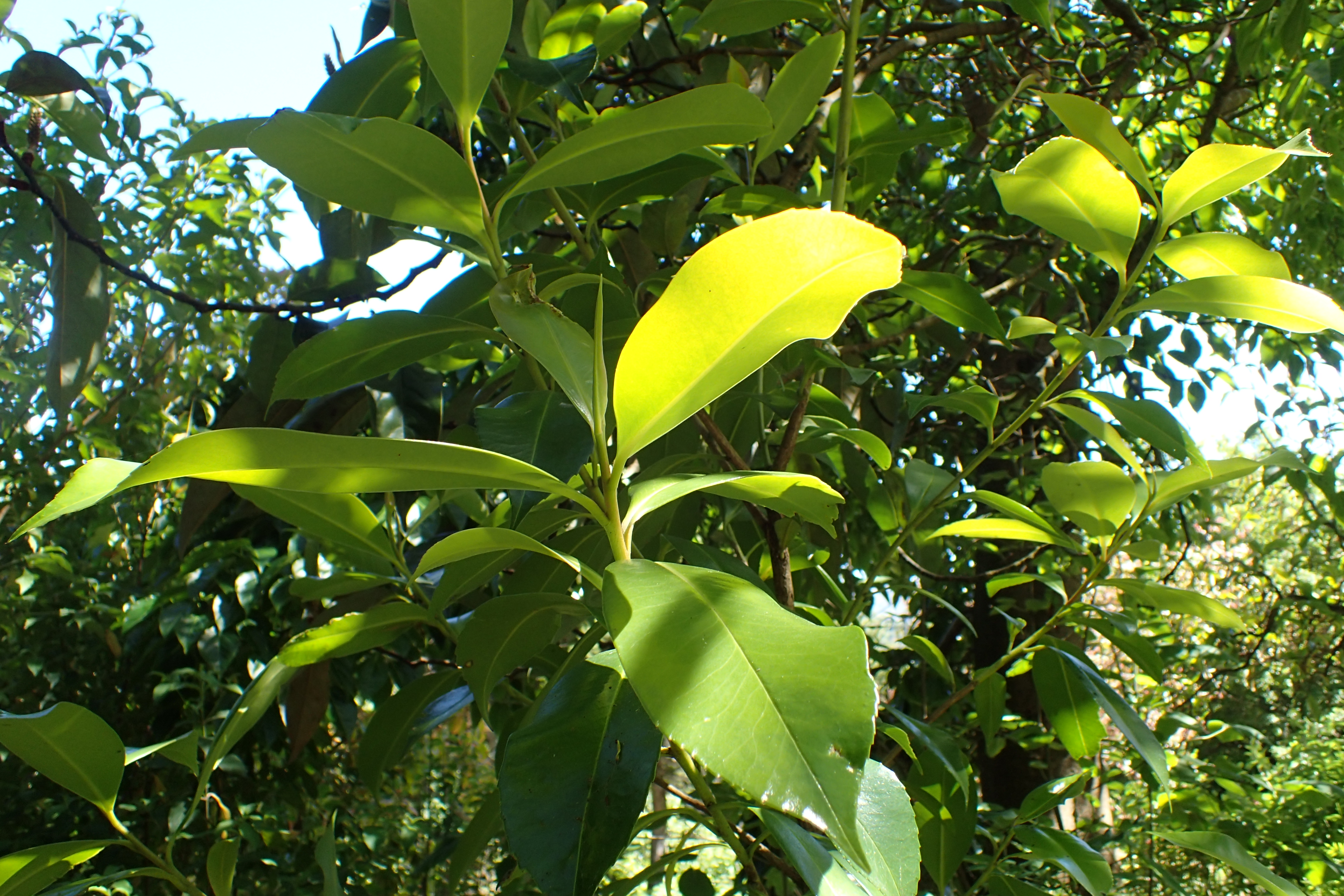
- Camellia taliensis

Scientific classification
- Kingdom: Plantae
- Clade: Embryophytes
- Clade: Tracheophytes
- Clade: Spermatophytes
- Clade: Angiosperms
- Clade: Eudicots
- Clade: Asterids
- Order: Ericales
- Family: Theaceae
- Genus: Camellia
- Section: Camellia sect. Thea (L.) Griff.

Type species
- Camellia sinensis (L.) Kuntze

Species
- See text

= Camellia sect. Thea =

Section of plants

Camellia sect. Thea is a section of the genus Camellia in the family Theaceae. It includes the tea plant (Camellia sinensis) and its wild relatives, all of which are evergreen woody plants mainly distributed in southern China and the Indochina Peninsula. Plants of this section are the raw material for tea beverage production and have significant economic and cultural importance. Due to morphological similarity among species, frequent hybridization, and divergent taxonomic opinions, species delimitation within sect. Thea has long been controversial.

== Taxonomy ==
There are three main taxonomic treatments of sect. Thea. Sealy (1958), in his revision of the genus Camellia, recognized only five species. Chang (1981, 1998) divided the section into four series, 32 species and four varieties based on morphological characters. Ming (2000) and the Flora of China rejected the rank of series and recognized 12 species and six varieties. Subsequently, new taxa have continued to be described, and by 2021 the number of valid names had reached 52. Molecular phylogenetic studies in the 21st century have revealed extensive hybridization, chloroplast capture, and incomplete lineage sorting within the section, indicating that relying solely on morphology or chloroplast genome data is insufficient for accurate species delimitation.

== Molecular species delimitation ==
Two genome‑based studies published in 2024–2025 comprehensively delimited species within sect. Thea. One study used complete plastomes of 165 accessions representing 39 morphospecies as super‑barcodes and integrated three methods (ASAP, PTP and mPTP) to propose 28 consensus molecular operational taxonomic units (c‑MOTUs). Ten morphospecies were suggested to be species complexes, and ten others were considered to require splitting.

The other study combined chloroplast genomes, 759 single-copy nuclear genes, and Skmer analyses of 98 accessions. It recommended treating the section as 14 species, raising Assam tea (C. sinensis var. assamica) to species rank as Camellia assamica, raising C. tachangensis var. remotiserrata to species rank as Camellia remotiserrata, and synonymizing C. sinensis var. pubilimba under C. sinensis.

== Characteristics ==
Flowers 1–3, axillary, white, medium-sized or small, pedicellate. Bracts 2, caducous. Sepals 5–6, persistent. Petals 6–11, nearly free. Stamens in 2–3 whorls, outer whorl nearly free. Ovary 3–5-locular, styles free or connate at the lower part, 3–5(–7)-lobed. Capsule with a central axis. Species of this section mostly contain caffeine in their leaves, while some contain only theobromine.

== Species ==
The following species are accepted in sect. Thea based on the treatment of Ming (2000) with updates from recent molecular evidence (some taxa remain controversial):

- Camellia assamica (J.W.Mast.) H.T.Chang
- Camellia crassicolumna Hung T.Chang
- Camellia crispula Hung T.Chang
- Camellia danzaiensis Hung T.Chang & K.M.Lan
- Camellia fangchengensis S.Ye Liang & Y.C.Zhong
- Camellia formosensis (Masam. & Suzuki) M.H.Su, C.F.Hsieh & C.H.Tsou
- Camellia grandibracteata Hung T.Chang & F.L.Yu
- Camellia gymnogyna Hung T.Chang
- Camellia kwangsiensis Hung T.Chang
- Camellia leptophylla S.Ye Liang ex Hung T.Chang
- Camellia ptilophylla Hung T.Chang
- Camellia remotiserrata Hung T.Chang
- Camellia sinensis (L.) Kuntze
- Camellia taliensis (W.W.Sm.) Melch.

== Distribution and conservation ==
The section is naturally distributed in southern China and adjacent India, Myanmar, Laos, Vietnam, and Thailand. All wild species of sect. Thea occurring in China have been listed as National Grade‑II Protected Wild Plants in the updated List of National Key Protected Wild Plants of China (2021). Accurate species delimitation is essential for formulating science‑based conservation strategies and for the sustainable utilization of tea plant germplasm resources.
