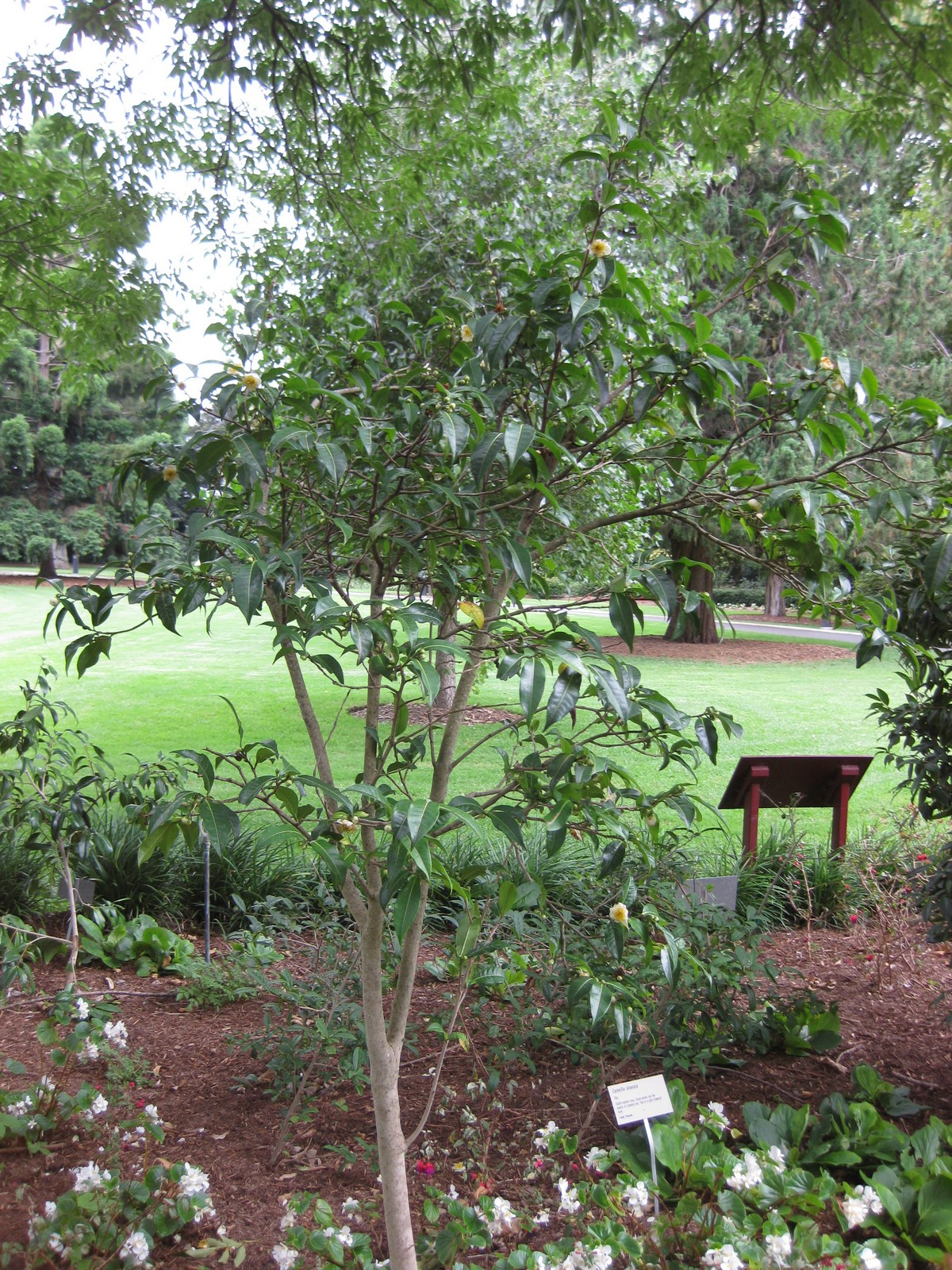

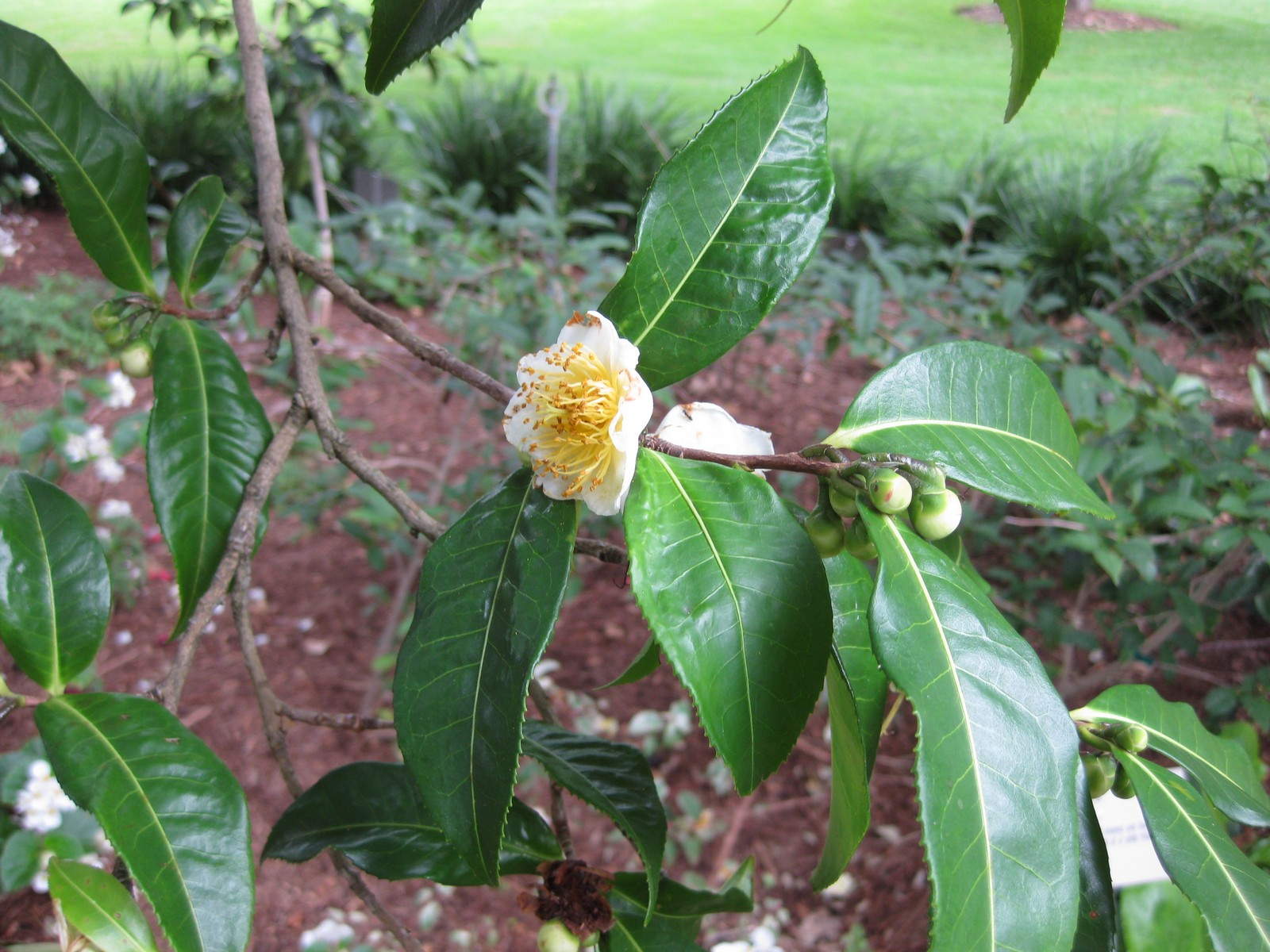

Conservation status
- Least Concern (IUCN 3.1)

Scientific classification
- Kingdom: Plantae
- Clade: Tracheophytes
- Clade: Angiosperms
- Clade: Eudicots
- Clade: Asterids
- Order: Ericales
- Family: Theaceae
- Genus: Camellia
- Species: C. taliensis

Binomial name
- Camellia taliensis (W.W.Sm.) Melch.

= Camellia taliensis =

Species of flowering plant

Camellia taliensis (also known as Yunnan large leaf varietal tea, wild tea, Dali tea, Yunnan broad tea, Fried egg plant and others; 大理茶) is a small species of evergreen shrub whose leaves and leaf buds are used to produce tea.

It is of the genus Camellia of flowering plants in the family Theaceae.

C. taliensis is an important wild relative to the cultivated tea plant Camellia sinensis. It also belongs to the same section Thea as C. sinensis.

The species is cultivated on many farms in Yunnan province in China and not considered endangered. However, its wild populations are shrinking due to human caused fragmentation of the plant's natural habitat and from the excessive harvesting of the leaves for the tea market.

== Nomenclature and taxonomy ==
'C. taliensis' comes from the old name of Dali, Tali, where the plant is from. The plant is also known as Wild tea as it grows wild in forests, Dali tea again after the town, and Fried egg plant because of the morphology of the flower.

== Description ==
Camellia taliensis can grow from 2-8m tall and has five locules per ovary while C. sinensis has three. C. taliensis leaves are abaxially yellow-green and adaxially dark- or yellow-green, and are shiny on both surfaces. The plant's seeds are brown. The flowers are creamy or white with numerous stamens, by chance creating the appearance of a fried egg.

It grows primarily in the southwestern section of Yunnan and in neighbouring areas in Thailand and northern Myanmar.

C. taliensis has larger leaves than C. sinensis var. sinensis closer to the size of C. sinensis var. assamica. In several chemical composition and morphological comparisons, C. taliensis is also closer to C. sinensis var. assamica than to C. sinensis var. sinensis. However, the closer similarity may also be due to human selection (which causes reduction in genetic diversity) as C. sinensis var. assamica is the tea variety traditionally cultivated in Yunnan.

Like C. sinensis, C. taliensis contains both theanine and caffeine.

C. taliensis can be easily crossed with C. sinensis, and the resulting crossbred plants are intermediate between species both morphologically and chemically indicating true hybrids.

== Cultivation ==
The plant was originally used to make tea by mushroom gatherers who took young leaf buds and, with the help of local expertise, they used the dry buds to make black tea "unlike any others".

C. taliensis is seasonally gathered in early spring when new leaves are produced.

C. taliensis is locally used to make white tea, black tea and pu'er tea.

Yue Guang Bai (月光白 "Moonlight White") is a white tea made from the plant.

Yunnan pu-erh tea made from C. taliensis can command a much higher price than pu'er made from the more common C. sinensis.

== Bibliography ==
- Chen, Jin; Wang, Pingsheng; Xia, Yongmei; Xu, Mei; Pei, Shengji (2005). "Genetic diversity and differentiation of Camellia sinensis L. (cultivated tea) and its wild relatives in Yunnan province of China, revealed by morphology, biochemistry and allozyme studies". Genetic Resources and Crop Evolution. 52: 41–52. doi:10.1007/s10722-005-0285-1.
- Liu, Yang; Yang, Shi-xiong; Ji, Peng-zhang; Gao, Li-zhi (2012). "Phylogeography of Camellia taliensis (Theaceae) inferred from chloroplast and nuclear DNA: Insights into evolutionary history and conservation". BMC Evolutionary Biology. 12 (1): 92. Bibcode:2012BMCEE..12...92L. doi:10.1186/1471-2148-12-92. PMC 3495649. PMID 22716114.
