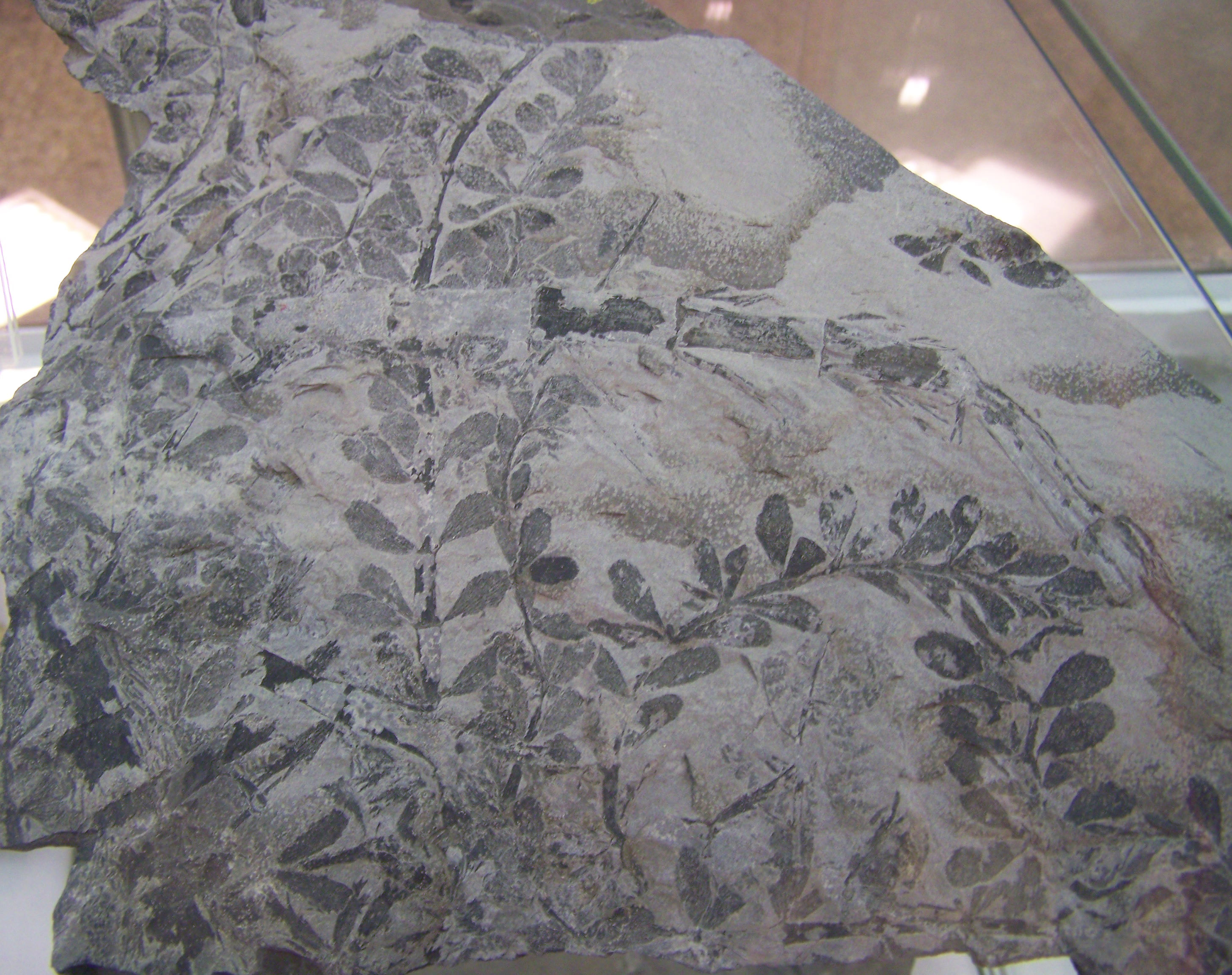
- Fossil leaves and branches of the species Sphenophyllum miravallis, Upper Carboniferous. Collection of the Universiteit Utrecht.

Scientific classification
- Kingdom: Plantae
- Clade: Tracheophytes
- Division: Polypodiophyta
- Class: Polypodiopsida
- Subclass: Equisetidae
- Order: †Sphenophyllales; Seward, 1898

Genera
- †Hamatophyton †Bowmanites †Cheirostrobus †Columnisporites †Gondwanophyton †Lilpopia †Peltastrobus †Rinistachya †Rotafolia †Sentistrobus †Sphenophyllostachys †Sphenophyllum †Xihuphyllum

= Sphenophyllales =

Sphenophyllales Temporal range: Devonian–Triassic

Order of plants

Sphenophyllales is an extinct order of articulate land plants and a sister group to the present-day Equisetales (horsetails). They are fossils dating from the Devonian to the Triassic. They were common during the Late Pennsylvanian to Early Permian, with most of the fossils coming from the Carboniferous period.

== Description ==
Sphenophyllales are small, slender branching plants, usually growing to a height of less than 1 m (3.3 ft) tall. The long stems range from 0.5 cm (0.20 in) to 1.2 cm (0.47 in) in diameter. The stems are jointed and ribbed with weak habits, making it probable that these plants were vine or shrub-like when alive, and formed a portion of the understory in Carboniferous forests. The stem anatomy is protostelic (root-like), containing a solid primary xylem core with secondary xylem tissue present in some species. The leaves, which can be several centimeters long, are borne on each node in whorls (called verticels) and are wedge-shaped, fan-shaped, linear, or forked. Reproductive parts are either long terminal cones (consisting of two lobes, a sterile lower lobe and the fertile upper lobe bearing the sporangia) or loose strobili. All sphenophylls are homosporous, with monolete or trilete spores.

== Taxonomy ==
Sphenophyllales was first described by the British botanist and geologist Albert Seward in 1898. The name comes from the Greek words σφήν ("wedge") and φύλλον ("leaf").

Sphenophyllalean taxonomy is often derived from isolated fossilized parts of plants and classification may be based on the morphology and anatomy of sterile plant parts (like leaves) or fructifications (mainly the fossilized cones and the stratigraphically-important spores found near them). This results in species that may actually by synonymous. Sphenophyllales is typified by the genus Sphenophyllum.

== Phylogeny ==
The probable relationships within Equisetidae are shown in the cladogram below. The possible position of Ibyka has been added.

- - †Ibyka (?)
  - - †Pseudobornia ursina
    - - †Sphenophyllales
      - - †Archaeocalamitaceae
        - - †Calamitaceae
          - - Equisetaceae
