= Cryptospore =

Fossilised primitive plant spore

Cryptospores are microscopic fossilized spores produced by embryophytes (land plants). They first appear in the fossil record during the middle of the Cambrian period, as the oldest fossil evidence for the colonization of land by plants. A similar (though broader) category is miospores, a term generally used for spores smaller than 200 μm. Both cryptospores and miospores are types of palynomorphs.

Cryptospores, which occur as permanent tetrads, dyads, or hilate monads, sometimes with additional wall envelopes, dominated fossil assemblages for approximately 60 million years, first appearing around 470 million years ago during the Ordovician Period. They underwent rapid diversification during what Jane Gray (1993) called the Eoembryophytic epoch, but experienced an abrupt decline in diversity and abundance around 410 Ma during the latest Lochkovian (Early Devonian), with only a few forms persisting into the Emsian period. In contrast, trilete monads began diversifying around 430 Ma in the latter Silurian Period and eventually became the dominant element in dispersed spore assemblages. While trilete monads are generally associated with vascular plants, cryptospores lack close modern analogues (except possibly in some liverworts), making the identification of their parent plants one of evolutionary botany's significant unresolved problems.

== Evidence that cryptospores derive from land plants ==
=== Occurrence ===
Cryptospores are generally found in non-marine rocks and decrease in abundance with distance offshore. This suggests that any cryptospores found in the marine environment were transported there by the wind from the land, rather than originating from the marine environment.

=== Wall ultrastructure ===
The walls of cryptospores consist of many lamellae (thin sheets). Liverworts, thought to be the most primitive land plants, also have this spore wall morphology.

=== Chemical composition ===
(Some) cryptospores are composed of sporopollenin and have the same chemical makeup as co-occurring trilete spores.

== Other information ==
Recently, fossils of plant sporangia have been found in Oman with cryptospores showing concentric lamellae in their walls, similar to liverworts. The earliest known cryptospores are from Middle Cambrian. Spores from the Lindegård Mudstone (late Katian–early Hirnantian) represent the earliest record of early land plant spores from Sweden and possibly also from Baltica and implies that land plants had migrated to the palaeocontinent Baltica by at least the Late Ordovician. This discovery reinforces the earlier suggestion that the migration of land plants from northern Gondwana to Baltica in the Late Ordovician was facilitated by the northward migration of Avalonia, which is evidenced by the co-occurrence of reworked, Early–Middle Ordovician acritarchs, possibly suggesting an Avalonian provenance in a foreland basin system.

== See also ==
- Paleobotany
- Palynology
