= International Fossil Plant Names Index =

Online paleobotany database

The International Fossil Plant Names Index (acronym IFPNI) is an online database of paleobotany. The site was launched in May 2014 to list the scientific names of fossil plants, algae, fungi, allied prokaryotic forms (formerly treated as algae and Cyanophyceae in particular), algal-related protists and microfossils published using binomial nomenclature.
