= List of botanical gardens in Indonesia =

Botanical gardens in Indonesia have collections consisting entirely of Indonesian native and endemic species; most have a collection that include plants from around the world. There are botanical gardens and arboreta in all states and territories of Indonesia, most are administered by local governments, some are privately owned.

== Indonesian Institute of Science ==
- Bogor Botanical Gardens, Bogor, West Java
- Cibodas Botanical Garden, Cianjur, West Java
- Purwodadi Botanical Garden, Pasuruan, East Java
- Bali Botanic Garden, Bedugul, Bali

All 4 of the above Botanic Gardens are under Indonesian Institute of Science.

== Public ==
The rest of the botanical gardens are under Regency/City administrations. Indonesia plans to have a total of 45 Botanical Gardens.

- Ecopark (Cibinong Science Center-Botanical Garden), Bogor, West Java – extension of Bogor Botanical Garden.
- Kuningan Botanical Garden, Kuningan Regency, West Java
- Baturaden Botanical Gardens, Banyumas Regency, Central Java
- Sukorambi Botanical Garden, Jember, East Java
- Samosir Botanical Gardens, Samosir Regency, North Sumatra
- South Sumatra Botanical Gardens, Palembang, South Sumatra (Under development)
- Solok Botanical Gardens, Solok Regency, West Sumatra
- Jambi Botanical Gardens, Batang Hari Regency, Jambi (Under development)
- Liwa Botanical Gardens, West Lampung Regency, Lampung
- Unmul Samarinda Botanical Gardens, Samarinda, East Kalimantan
- Danau Lait Botanical Gardens, Sanggau Regency, West Kalimantan (Under development)
- Katingan Botanical Gardens, Katingan Regency, Central Kalimantan
- Balikpapan Botanical Gardens, Balikpapan, East Kalimantan
- Banua Botanical Gardens, Banjarbaru, South Kalimantan (Under development)
- Massenrempulu Enkerang Botanical Gardens, Enrekang Regency, South Sulawesi
- Gardenia Botanical Gardens, Minahasa Regency, North Sulawesi (Under development)
- Pucak Botanical Gardens, Maros Regency, South Sulawesi
- Parepare Botanical Gardens, Parepare, South Sulawesi (Under development)
- Lombok Botanical Gardens, Lombok, West Nusa Tenggara
- Kendari Botanical Garden, Kendari, Southeast Sulawesi
