= Bogor Botanical Gardens =

Botanical garden in Java, Indonesia

Coordinates: 6°35′51″S 106°47′54″E

- Kebun Raya Bogor
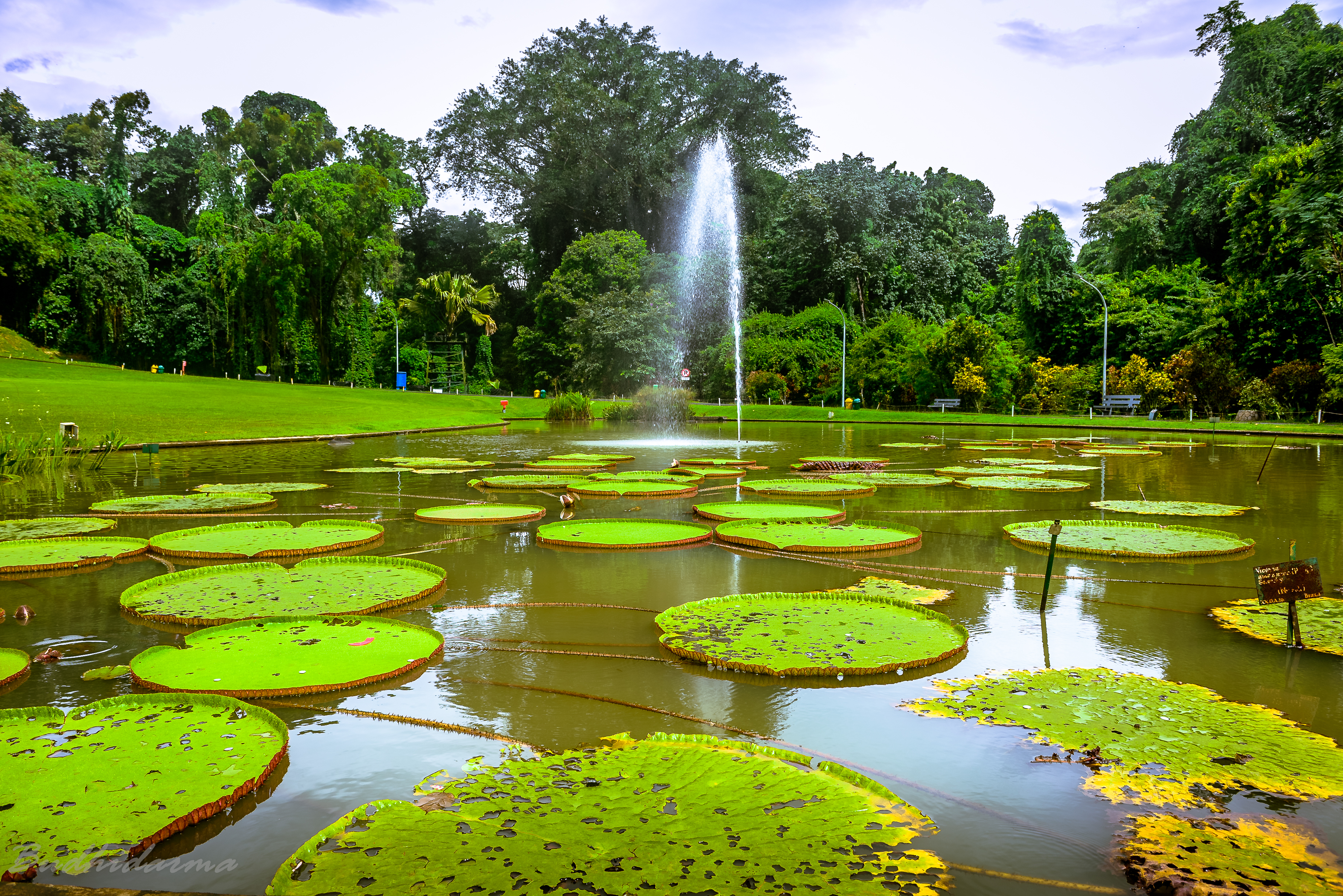
- Lily pond in the Bogor Botanical Garden
- Interactive map of Bogor Botanical Gardens
- Type: Botanic Garden
- Location: Bogor, West Java, Indonesia
- Area: 87 hectares (210 acres; 0.87 km^{2})
- Created: May 18, 1817
- Founder: Caspar Georg Carl Reinwardt
- Operator: National Research and Innovation Agency
- Status: Open
- Public transit: Bogor
- Website: kebunraya.id/bogor

The Bogor Botanical Gardens (Indonesian: Kebun Raya Bogor) is a botanical garden located in Bogor, Indonesia, 60 km south of central Jakarta. It is currently operated by the National Research and Innovation Agency. The garden is located in the city center and adjoin the presidential palace compound of Istana Bogor. It covers an area of 87 hectares (210 acres) and contains 13,983 different kinds of trees and plants of various origin. The geographic position of Bogor means it rains almost daily, even in the dry season. This makes the garden an advantageous location for the cultivation of tropical plants.

Founded in 1817 by the order of the government of the Dutch East Indies, the garden thrived under the leadership of many renowned botanists including Johannes Elias Teijsmann, Rudolph Herman Christiaan Carel Scheffer, and Melchior Treub. Since its foundation, the Bogor botanical garden has served as a major research center for agriculture and horticulture. It is the oldest botanical garden in Southeast Asia.

== History ==
=== Background ===
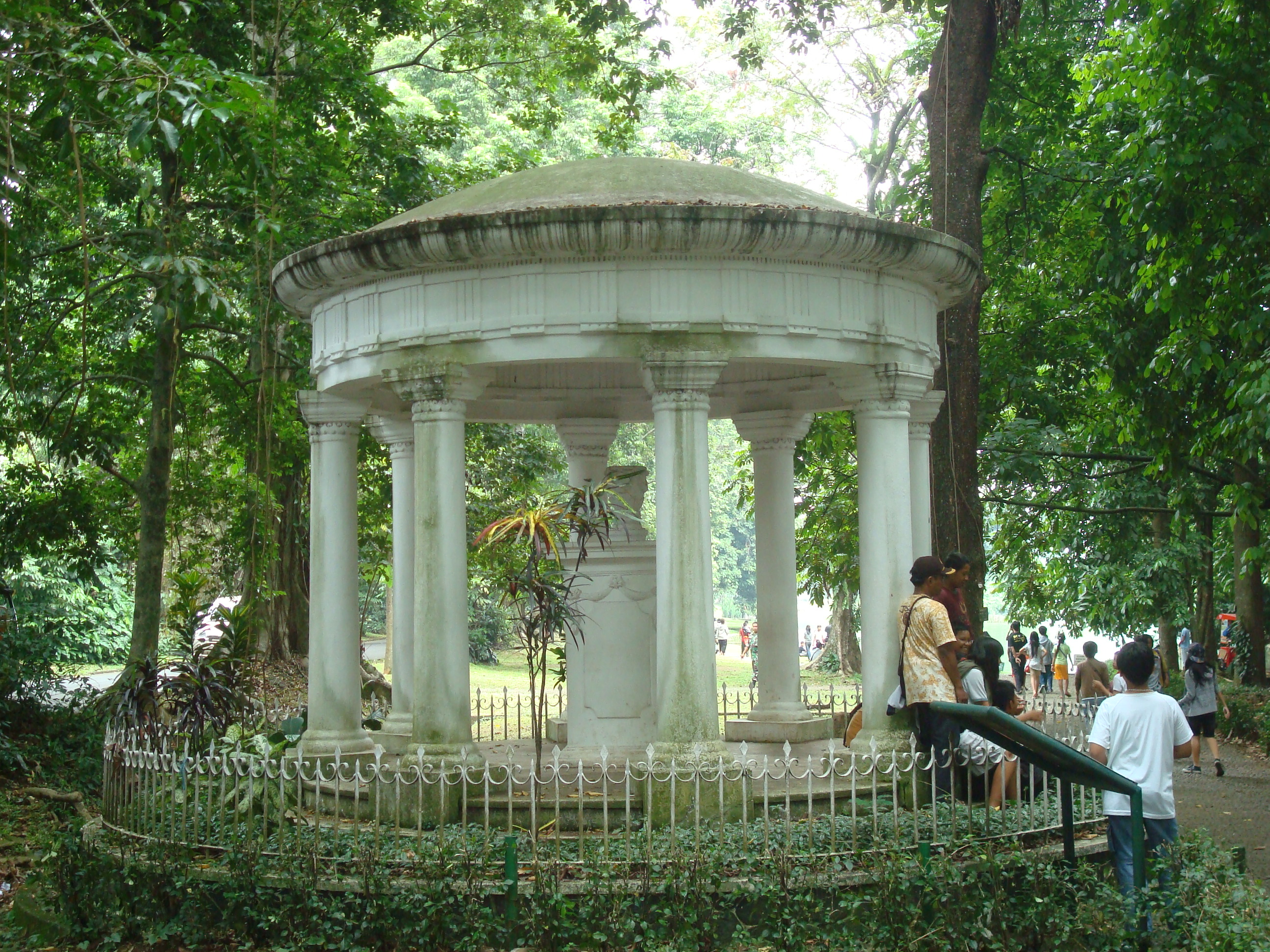
Memorial of Lady Raffles

The forest remained neglected after the Sundanese kingdom was destroyed in the 16th century. In 1744 the Dutch East India Company established a garden and mansion at the site of the present botanical gardens in Buitenzorg (now known as Bogor).

After the successful British invasion of Java in 1811, Stamford Raffles was appointed as the island's lieutenant-governor, and he took Buitenzorg Palace as his residence. During his rule in the palace, he had the garden re-landscaped into English-style garden. His wife, Olivia Mariamne Raffles, died in Buitenzorg on November 26, 1814, and was buried in Batavia. A memorial monument was built in the garden, as a commemoration for her.

=== 's Lands Plantentuin te Buitenzorg ===
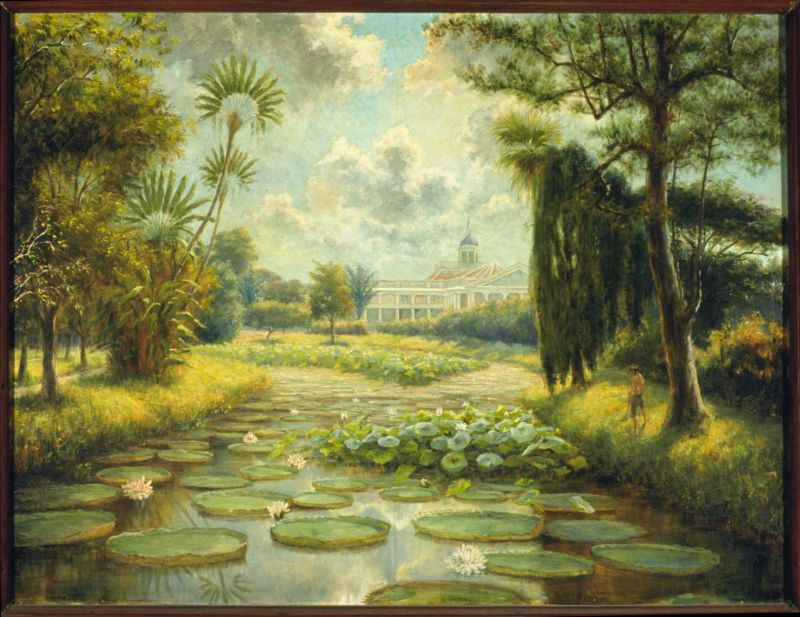
A painting of Buitenzorg Paleis by Max Fleischer in 1899.

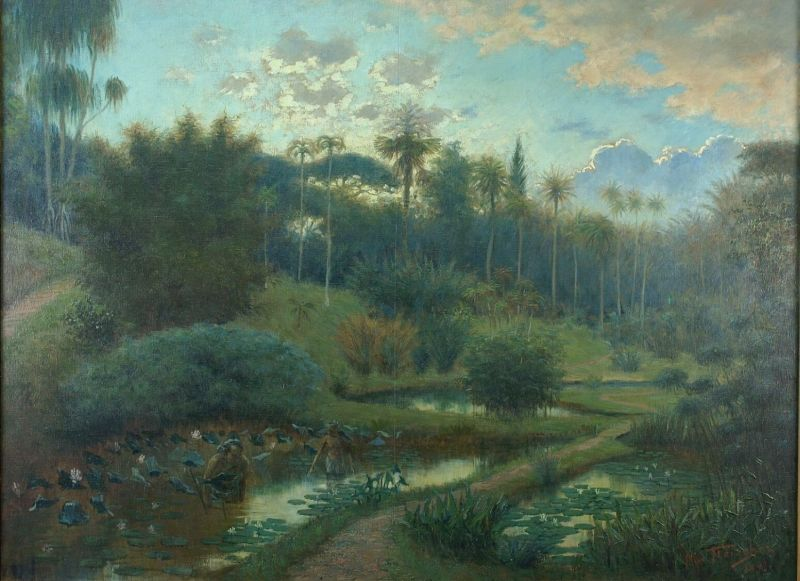
An oil painting depicting life on Buitenzorg Plantentuin in 1899.

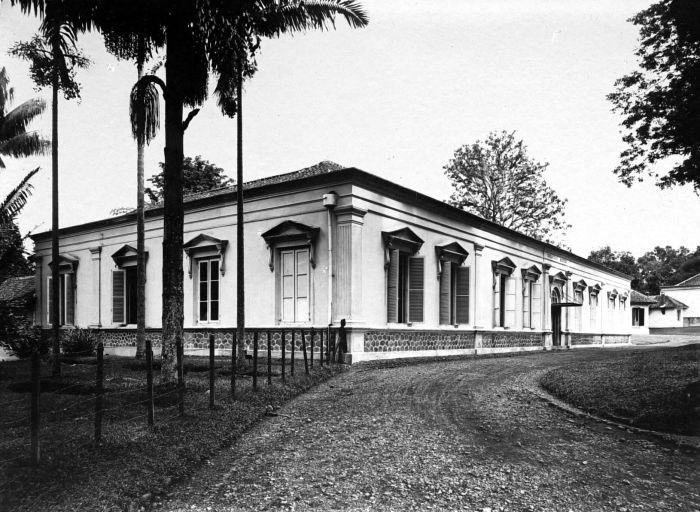
Zoologisch Museum en Laboratorium built in 1901, now Bogor Zoology Museum.

When the Anglo-Dutch Treaty came into effect, the Netherlands in 1816 sent a ship with officials to resume control of the colony. Among those on board was the German-born botanist Caspar Georg Carl Reinwardt, who was appointed as head of agriculture, arts and science of the colony. A year later he proposed the establishment of a botanical garden, a move which was supported by Governor-General Van der Capellen. The garden was officially founded on May 18, 1817, next to the palace grounds through a collaboration with two botanists, William Kent from Holland and James Hooper from Kew. The garden was established as 's Lands Plantentuin ('National Botanical Garden'). He became its first director for five years and gathered plants and seeds of economic potential from all over the archipelago for cultivation. Much of his taxonomic work was catalogued by his successor Carl Ludwig Blume in 1823, who recorded 914 plants in the garden.

In 1830, Johannes Elias Teijsmann, a Dutch botanist, became curator of Bogor Botanic Garden and spent more than 50 years developing the garden. Seven years later Justus Carl Hasskarl was appointed as his assistant curator and convinced the director to re-arrange the plantings in the garden by taxonomic families. Hasskarl proposed starting a library, which opened in 1842 as the Bibliotheca Bogoriensis, and constructed a separate building for the Herbarium Bogoriense, which opened in 1844. J. Teijsmann wrote the second catalogue of plants which listed more than 2800 species by 1844. He also has the garden significantly expanded in 1852, with a 120 hectares (300 acres) new garden branch laid down near the mountainous town of Cibodas.

In 1848 the garden received four seeds of West African oil palm, these trees were believed to be the mother tree in Southeast Asia from which numerous descendants were produced to support the growth of the palm oil industry in the region. However, the last original mother plant died in 1933. The garden also played major role in the introduction of Cinchona trees to Java in 1854, which would ultimately make the island the largest producer of quinine bark for malaria treatment. Later J. Teijsmann had the Botanic Garden detached from the palace garden as an independent institution on May 30, 1868.

The growth in economy and the effective directorship of Rudolph Scheffer and Melchior Treub, fueled the maturation of the garden as a leading regional center for biological study. In 1876 R. Scheffer, who was keen on agriculture development, founded the "economic garden" some distance from Buitenzorg. There he had culture crops such as coffee, rubber, tobacco, soy and rice, cultivated and experimented. In 1880, M. Treub became director of the garden and organized it into elaborate institutions. He founded the botanical laboratory (1884), the Zoologicum Bogoriense (1894) and a marine research laboratory (1904). In addition, he also had the garden expanded by 60 hectares (150 acres) in 1892. Under his leadership, fundamental research was successfully completed on diseases that threatened plants of economic importance, such as the coffee-leaf fungal disease and the sereh-disease on sugarcane plants.

The garden enjoyed wide international attention and was regularly visited by botanists and biologists from various countries to conduct research. This led to the opening of the new Treub's laboratory in 1914. A shortage of land occurred in 1927 due to the growing plants collection. Therefore, the garden was extended east of the Ciliwung river. Part of the new section was arranged in similar manner to the main garden, with the rest laid out as large lawns, avenues, ponds, teahouses and glasshouses for orchids. Astrid Avenue was laid out there to honor Queen Astrid of Belgium's visit in 1928; the avenue was decorated with spectacular displays of canna lilies of various colors.

A new branch of the garden was opened near the town of Pasuruan Regency in East Java, under the name Purwodadi Botanical Garden under the direction of the acting director Lourens Baas Becking on January 30, 1941. The new garden was intended for tropical-dry plants cultivation. However, before much could be done to develop the new garden, the Dutch East Indies would soon join World War II.

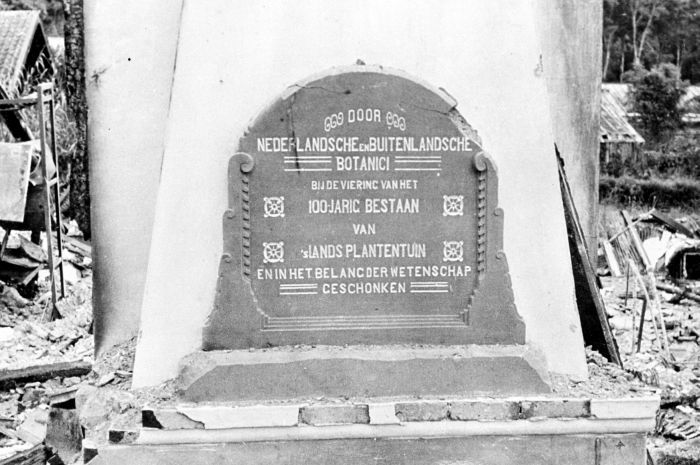
Remains of the monument celebrating the centenary of the gardens, shown in 1947. Partially destroyed in World War II.

In March 1942 the Japanese marched into Bogor and a year later took over the directorship of both the garden and the herbarium. Two Japanese botanists were appointed in charge of the botanic garden, Professor Takenoshin Nakai (中井猛之進) as director and Kanehira (兼平) as head of the herbarium. These two men strove to protect the garden from Japanese soldiers who planned to have the trees from the garden cut down for war lumber supplies. Under the Japanese the garden was renamed Shokubutsuen (植物園; Botanical Garden).

=== Kebun Raya Bogor ===
The Dutch returned to Indonesia after the Japanese surrendered and resumed management of the garden from 1945 to 1949. After Dutch recognition of Indonesia as a sovereign state, the Ministry of Agriculture took over the management of the garden and renamed 's Lands Plantentuin te Buitenzorg to "Institute of Nature Study" (Lembaga Pusat Penyelidikan Alam; LLPA) and the garden "Kebun Raya" (Great Garden). Kusnoto Setyodiwirjo became the first Indonesian curator, who eventually to become head of the garden in 1959.

In 1962, the garden and all research institutes associated with it became part of "Lembaga Biologi Nasional" (LBN; National Biological Institute), with Otto Soemarwoto appointed as director in 1964. He promoted scientific biological research at the garden, which would ultimately bring various benefits to pharmaceutical industries and agriculture development in Indonesia. Later in 1986, the National Biological Institute (LBN) was re-organised and split into the "Pusat Penelitian Biologi" (Puslitbang Biologi; Research and Development Centre for Biology), with the garden as a separate body.

=== Recent events ===
On May 16, 2006, the Indonesian Institute of Sciences (LIPI) celebrated its 189th anniversary in collaboration with the German Embassy. During the event a monument dedicated to Reinwardt was placed near Gunting pond. The anniversary was accompanied by the ASEAN-China Workshop Botanical Garden on Management and Plant Conservation event, which took place in the garden. At the end of the celebration, several trees were planted by the attending 10 ministries of ASEAN.

However, on the first of June 2006, a storm hit Bogor and many trees and plants in the garden that were more than 100 years old were damaged. As a result, the garden was closed a week for replanting and repair.

In 2009, an orchidarium was opened nearby the orchid house to celebrate the 192nd anniversary of the botanic gardens.

In 2020, Bogor Botanical Garden along with other 3 major Indonesian botanical gardens (Cibodas, Purwodadi & Bali) went into Public-Private Partnership to operate public services within the botanical gardens, a private company named PT. Mitra Natura Raya was established as a Government's strategic partner to operate the gardens.

== Features and layout ==
The garden is roughly square shaped covering an area of 87 hectares (210 acres), with additional 28.4 hectares (70 acres) of the ground in the north-west being the palace garden. The garden is divided by the Ciliwung river and has three bridges. The main gate is located in the south and is where most of the garden facilities are concentrated, such as ticket purchasing booth, Treub's laboratory, Nusa Indah Guesthouse, plant/souvenir shops, the library and the conservation building. The precinct east of Ciliwung was laid out in 1927 with facilities as the mosque, cafes, Herbarium, orchid section and Wisma Tamu guesthouse, near Astrid's avenue.

Today the garden contains 13,983 specimens of trees and plants, belonging to 3373 species, 1257 genera and 218 families. There are 288 species (88 genera) of exceptional palms along lawns and avenues. The gardens are a refuge for more than 50 different varieties of birds and for groups of bats roosting high in the trees.

In 1852, the Cibodas Botanical Gardens was founded as an extension of the Bogor Garden at the town of Cibodas, roughly 45 kilometers to the southeast of Bogor. A branch of the garden was opened in 1941 near the town of Purwodadi Botanical Garden, and later in 1959 another branch was opened in Bali.

=== Gunting Pond ===
South of the Bogor palace, the man-made pond served as habitat for wildlife of Kebun Raya Bogor. One of the most notable inhabitants of the pond is Victoria amazonica. The seed of the plant was sent from Amsterdam Botanical Garden in 1860. The monuments dedicated to Raffles' wife and Reinwardt are located near the pond.

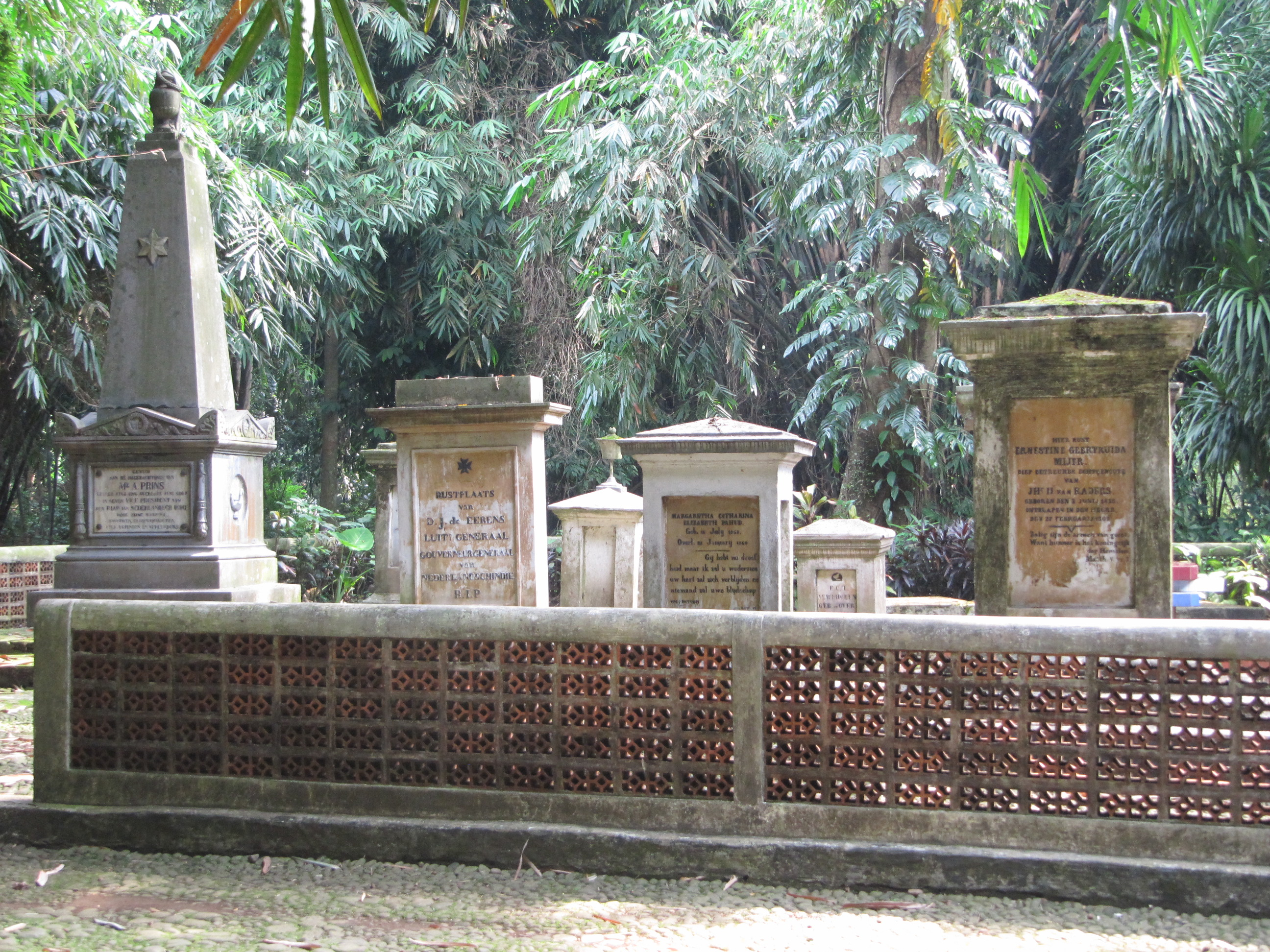
Dutch graves (Prins, De Eerens) in Bogor Botanical garden

=== Dutch cemetery ===
Nearby the Bogor palace's bamboo collection section there is a small cemetery with Dutch tombstones. One of its notable tombs belonged to the former governor general D. J. de Eerens, who was in office from 1836 to 1840. There are 42 gravestones with 38 identified persons, the oldest gravestone dates back to May 2, 1784.

=== Araceae Garden ===
Situated behind the seed bank of the garden, an area devoted to Araceae species of flora was built in 2010. This garden consists mainly of types of Schismatoglottis, Homalomena, Colocasia and some types of vines as Philodendron, Raphidophora. Approximately 10 trees with a height of more than 2 m have been planted in this garden area, functioning as a protection from direct sun exposure.

=== Teijsmann Garden ===
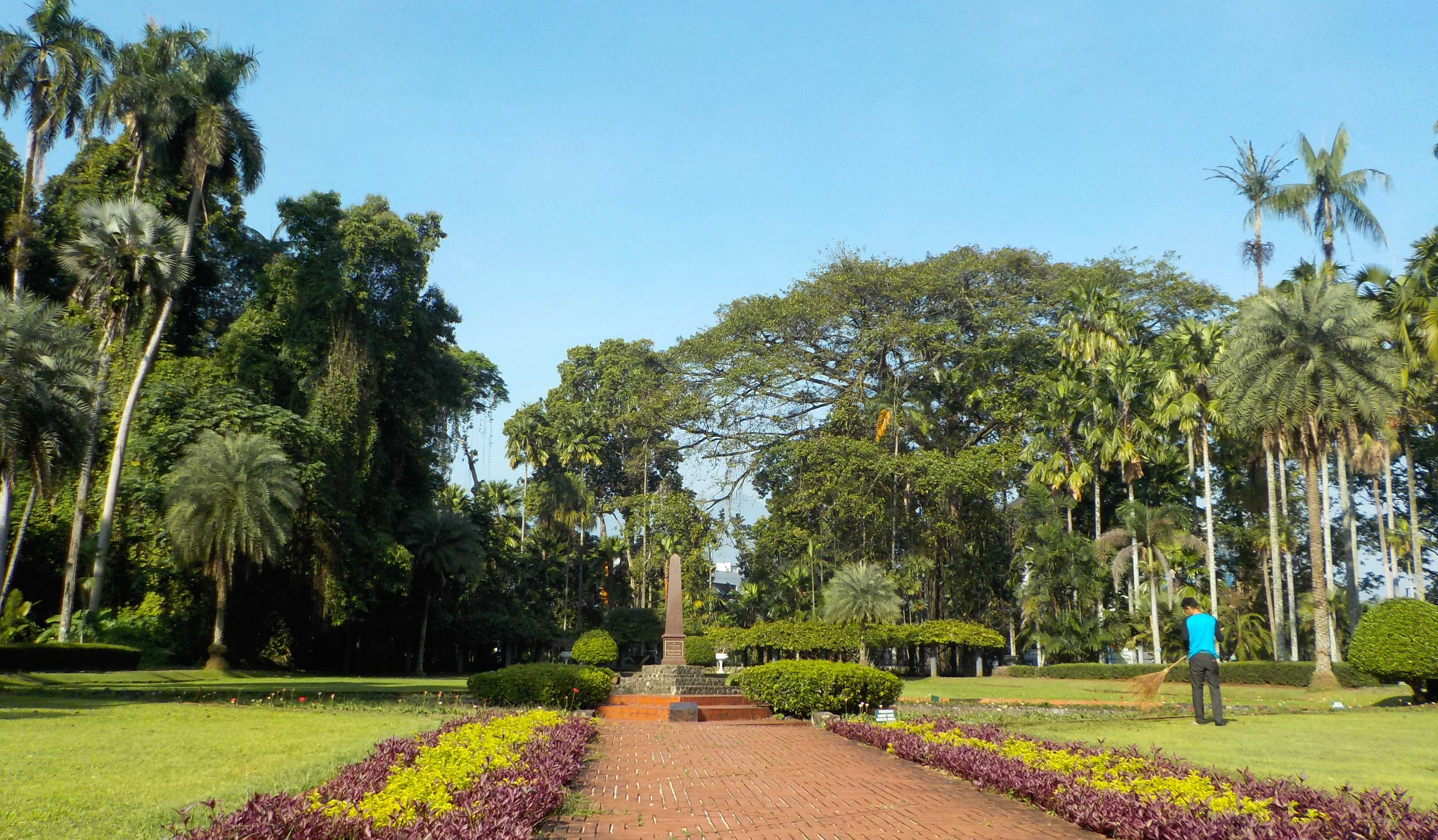
Teijsmann Garden at Bogor Botanical Garden

A small garden with a French rose garden layout was built in 1884 by M. Treub, as its name the garden was built as a memoir of Johannes Elias Teijsmann for his contribution to the garden's development. At the center of the garden lies the Teijsmann monument, erected using granite from Berlin.

=== Astrid Park ===
One of the historical and interesting places in Bogor Botanical Gardens is Astrid Avenue, this road was built in 1929 to welcome the arrival of Queen Astrid from Belgium who visited Bogor Botanical Gardens. Along this road are planted canna flowers, with red and yellow flowers like the colors of the Belgian flag.

=== Medicine Garden ===
This section of the garden contains plants that are commonly used for medicine ingredients and herbalism. Plants are separated into different sections according to their size and species. Descriptions of each of the different plants and their purpose as medicine ingredients are written for visitors.

=== Mexican Garden ===
A small patch of the botanical garden is dedicated to desert plants. There are roughly 100 species of cactus, agave, yucca and succulent plants from around Asia and the Americas.

=== Soedjana Kassan Garden ===
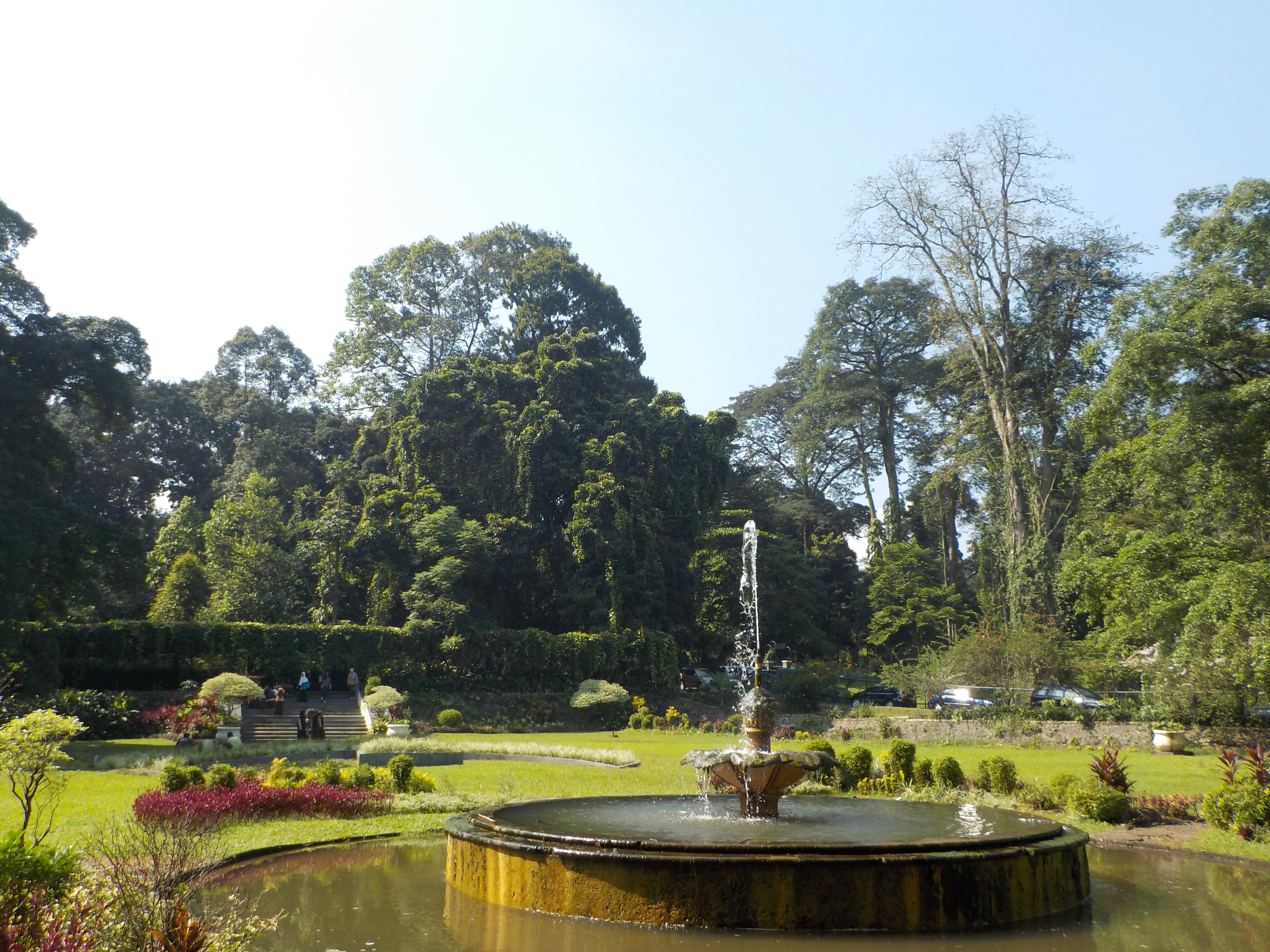
The Fountain at The Center of Sudjana Kassan Garden at Bogor Botanical Garden.

This garden is located at the north-eastern corner of the botanic garden and was built to commemorate Soedjana Kassan, who was head of Bogor Botanical Garden from 1959 to 1964. At the center of the garden, there are plants which are arranged to form Indonesia's national symbol of Garuda.

The Orchid House of Bogor Botanical garden

=== Orchids ===
Bogor Botanic Garden's collection of orchids focuses primarily on wild species, numbering approximately 500 species from over 100 genera. Grammatophyllum speciosum, the largest orchid species in the world is also part of the collection. The specimens seen in the garden's collections are either the original specimens gathered from the forest, or progeny of those specimens which have been propagated. Although the orchid collection at the Bogor Botanic Garden began much earlier, it was not until 1927 that the collection was moved into greenhouses. Beginning in 1994, the Bogor, Bali and Cibodas Gardens renovated their orchid houses.

The Botanic Garden Orchid section are divided into:

- Glasshouses - separated among hybrid and non-hybrid orchid species.
- Orchidarium - area for breeding orchids.

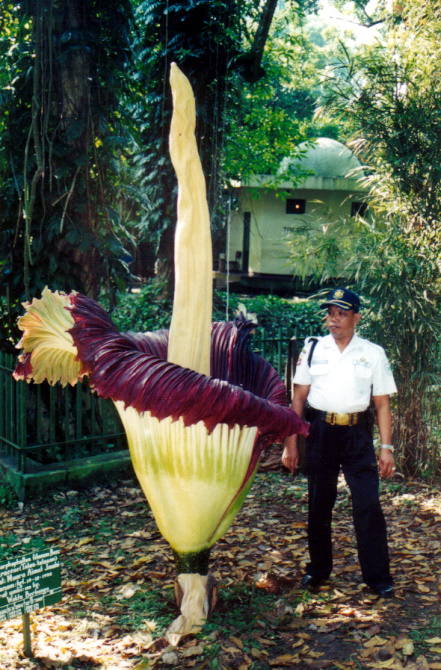
Amorphophallus titanum full bloom in Bogor Botanical Garden.

=== Amorphophallus titanum ===
Bogor Botanical Gardens has five Amorphophallus titanum plants in its collections, all from Pagar Alam, South Sumatra. This represents the greatest number of specimens among the botanical collection. The latest flowering events took place in January 2011 and on July 3, 2011.

=== Treub Laboratory ===
Treub's Laboratory opened on December 1, 1884. However the current building was built in 1914 to honor the botanist. The laboratory functions as a research facility for Puslitbang biologi's konservasi ex Situ (Conservation of species outside their original habitat). There are several branches of laboratories and facilities inside the building which is dedicated to different research as follows: Molecular Lab, Anatomy-Morphology Lab, Seed Conservation Lab, Ecological Conservation Lab and Greenhouses.

=== Bogor Zoology Museum ===
Situated nearby the laboratory and main gate of the garden, the museum started as a small laboratory founded in August 1894 and was used as a research facility for pest/insect control. The museum has an area of 1500 meter square and contains preserved collection of 10,000 species of insects and 2000 species of other fauna.

=== Guesthouses ===
There are two guesthouses located in the Botanic Garden. Nusa Indah Guesthouse was built in 1914, located next to the laboratory and museum. It was formerly used as a residence for directors of Bogor Botanical Garden. The second guesthouse is named Guesthouse Pinus, which was built during princess Astrid's visit in 1929.

== Directors of the garden ==
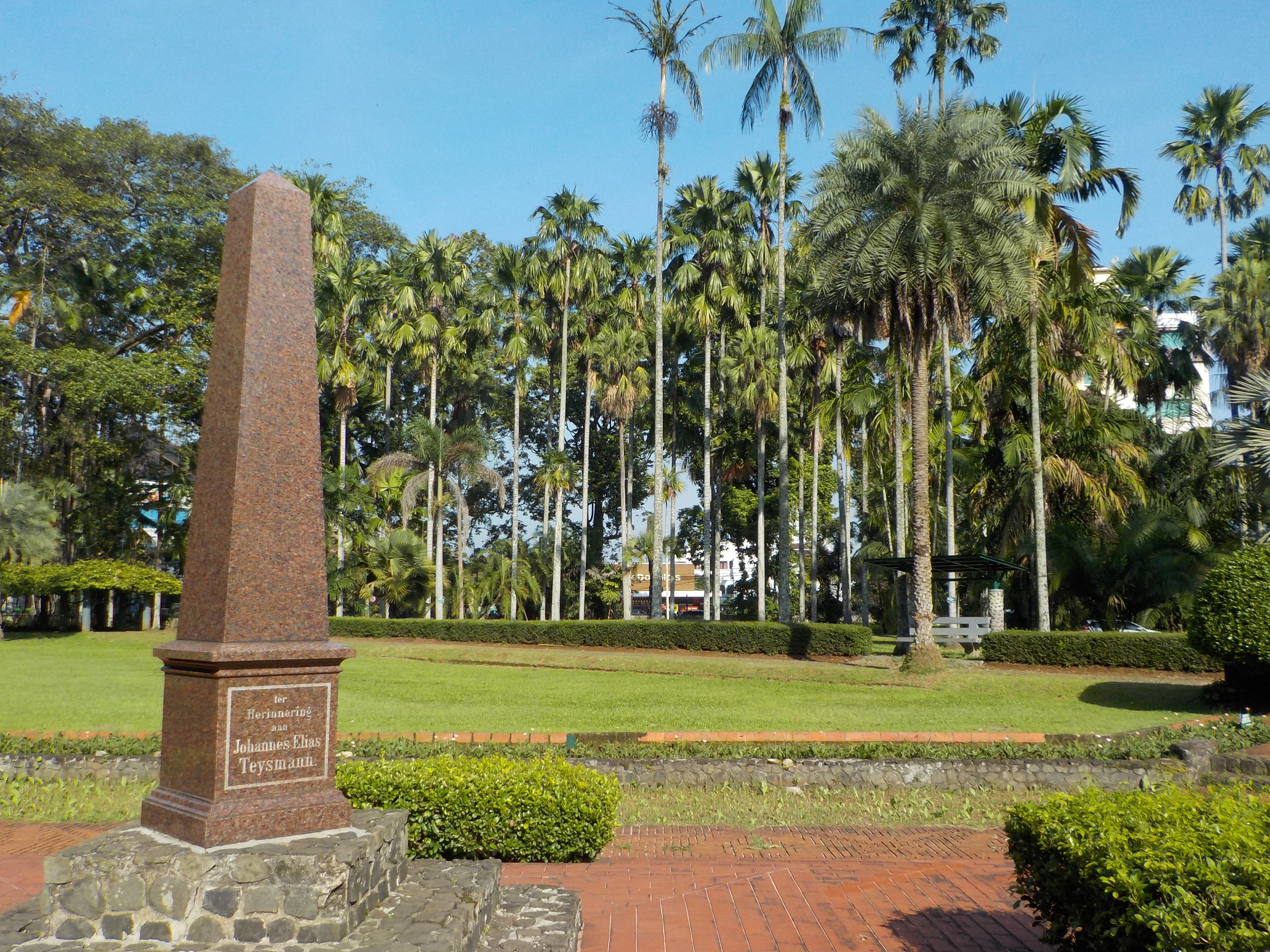
a monument to honor Johannes Elias Teysmann at Bogor Botanical Garden Indonesia

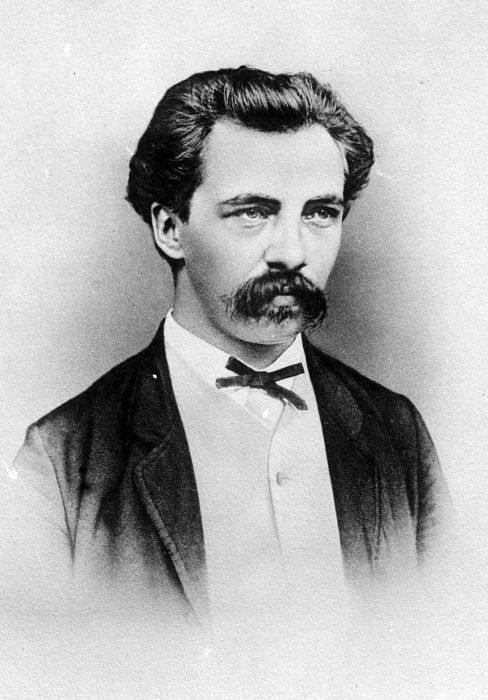
Rudolph Herman Christiaan Carel Scheffer (1844–1880)

- 1817–1822 : Caspar Georg Carl Reinwardt (1773–1854)
- 1823–1826 : Carl Ludwig Blume (1789–1862)
- 1830–1869 : Johannes Elias Teijsmann (1808–1882)
- 1869–1880 : Rudolph Herman Christiaan Carel Scheffer (1844–1880)
- 1880–1910 : Melchior Treub (1851–1910)
- 1910–1918 : J.C. Koningsberger
- 1918–1932 : Willem Marius Docters van Leeuwen (1880–1960)
- 1932–1939 : K.W. Dammerman
- 1939–1940 : L.G.M. Baas Becking
- 1940–1941 : T.H. Honert
- 1941–1943 : Dirk Fok van Slooten (1891–1953)
- 1943–1945 : Takenoshin Nakai (1882–1952)
- 1946–1948 : L.G.M. Baas Becking
- 1948–1949 : Dirk Fok van Slooten
- 1949–1959 : Kusnoto Setyodiwirjo
- 1959–1969 : Soedjana Kassan
- 1969–1981 : Didin Sastrapradja
- 1981–1983 : Made Sri Prana
- 1983–1987 : Usep Sutisna
- 1987–1990 : Sampurno Kadarsan
- 1990–1997 : Suhirman
- 1997–2002 : Dedi Darnaedi
- 2002–2008 : Irawati
- 2008–2013 : Mustaid Siregar
- 2013–2019 : Didik Widyatmoko
- 2019–2021 : R. Hendrian
- 2022 : Sukma Surya Kusuma

== Gallery ==
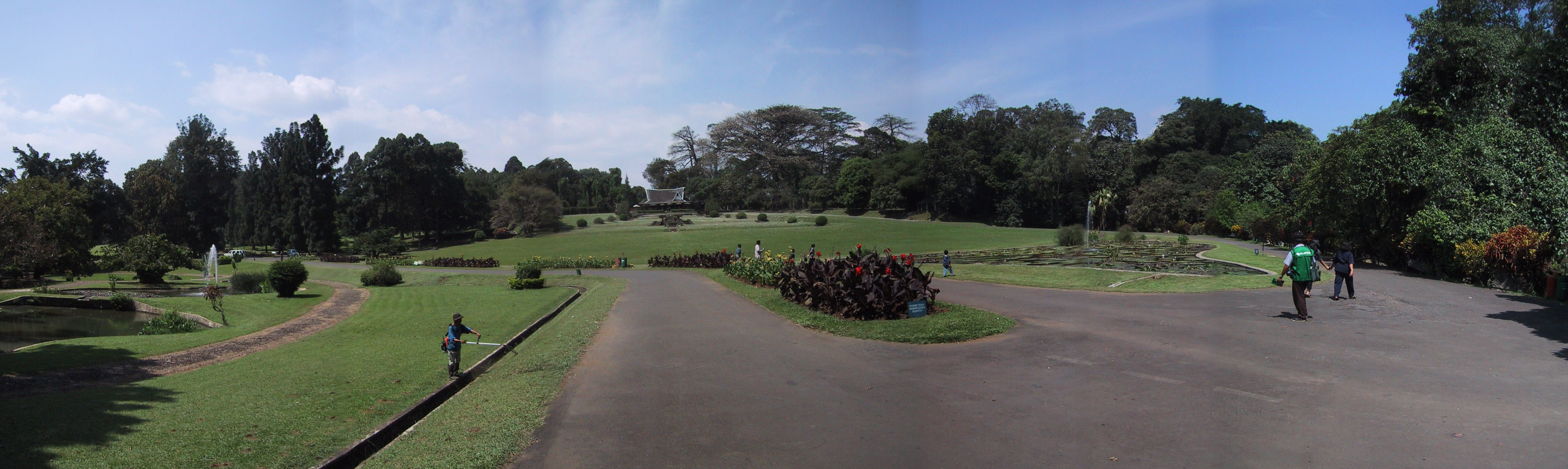
A panoramic view overlooking the Astrid avenue with Grand Garden Café in a further distance.
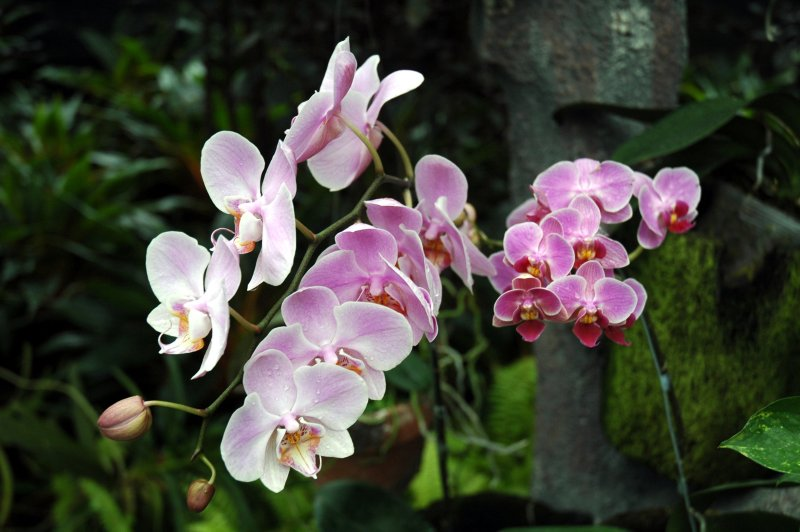
Phalaenopsis hybrids in orchid house

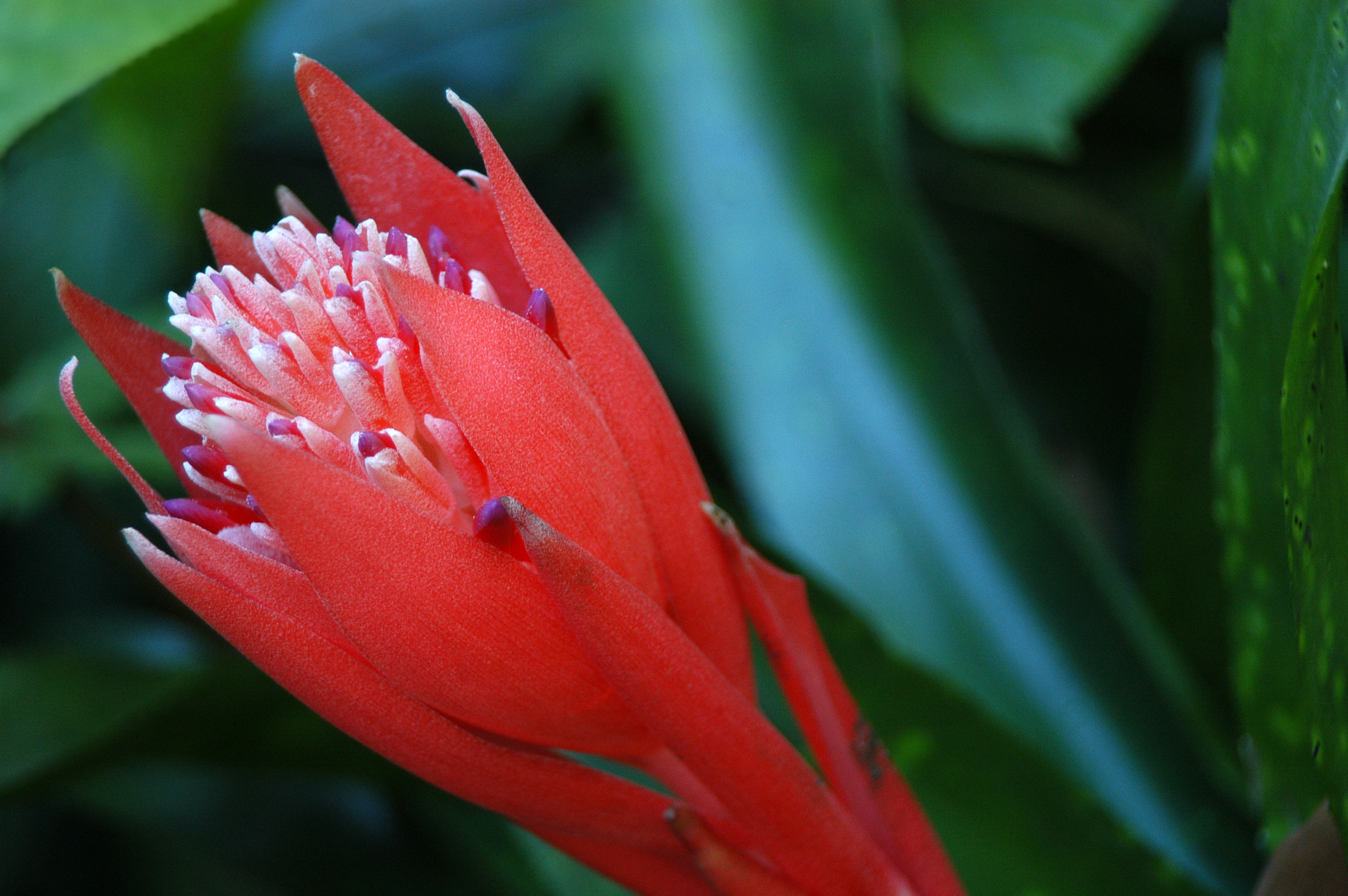
Billbergia pyramidalis

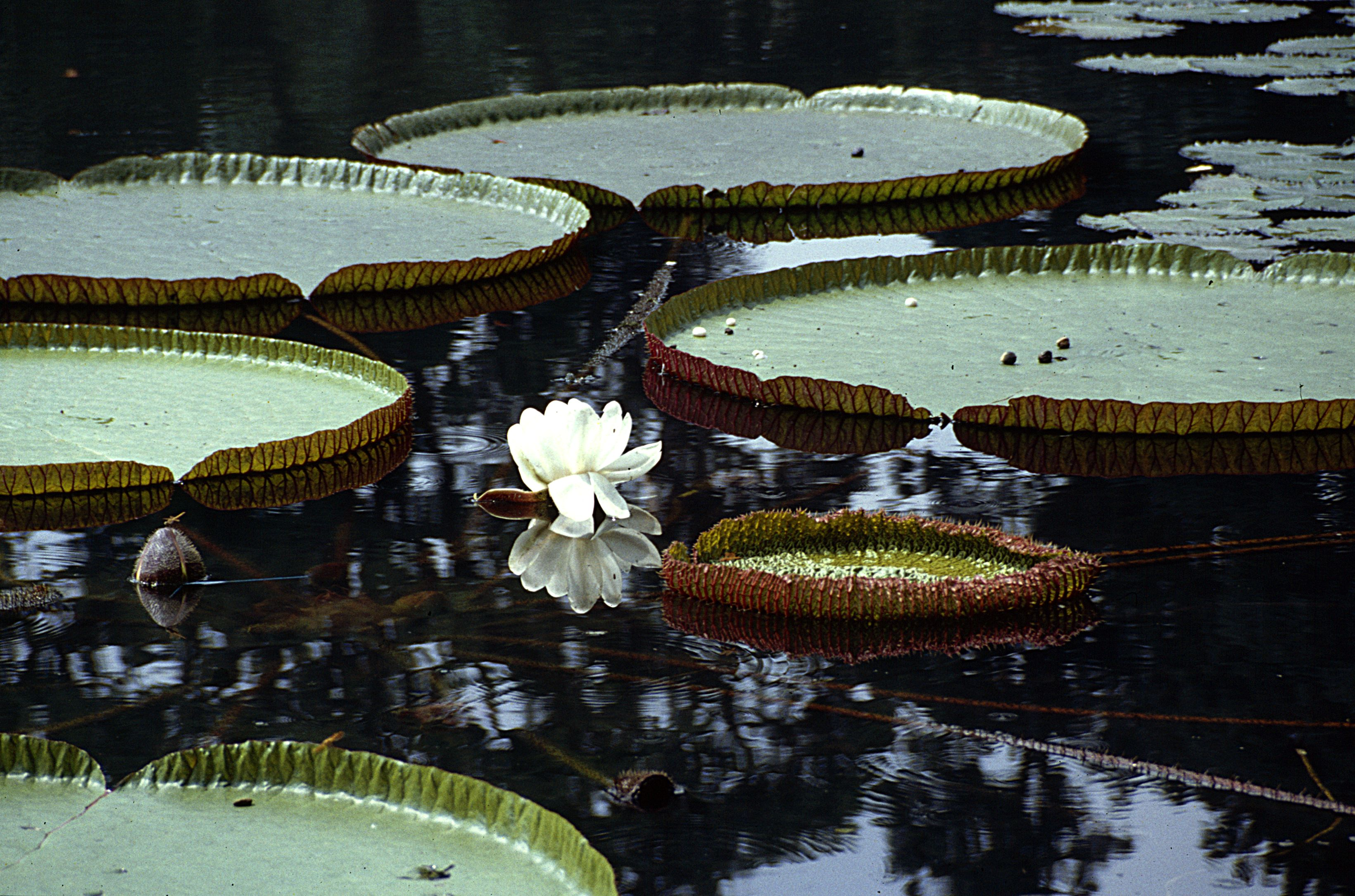
Victoria amazonica flower

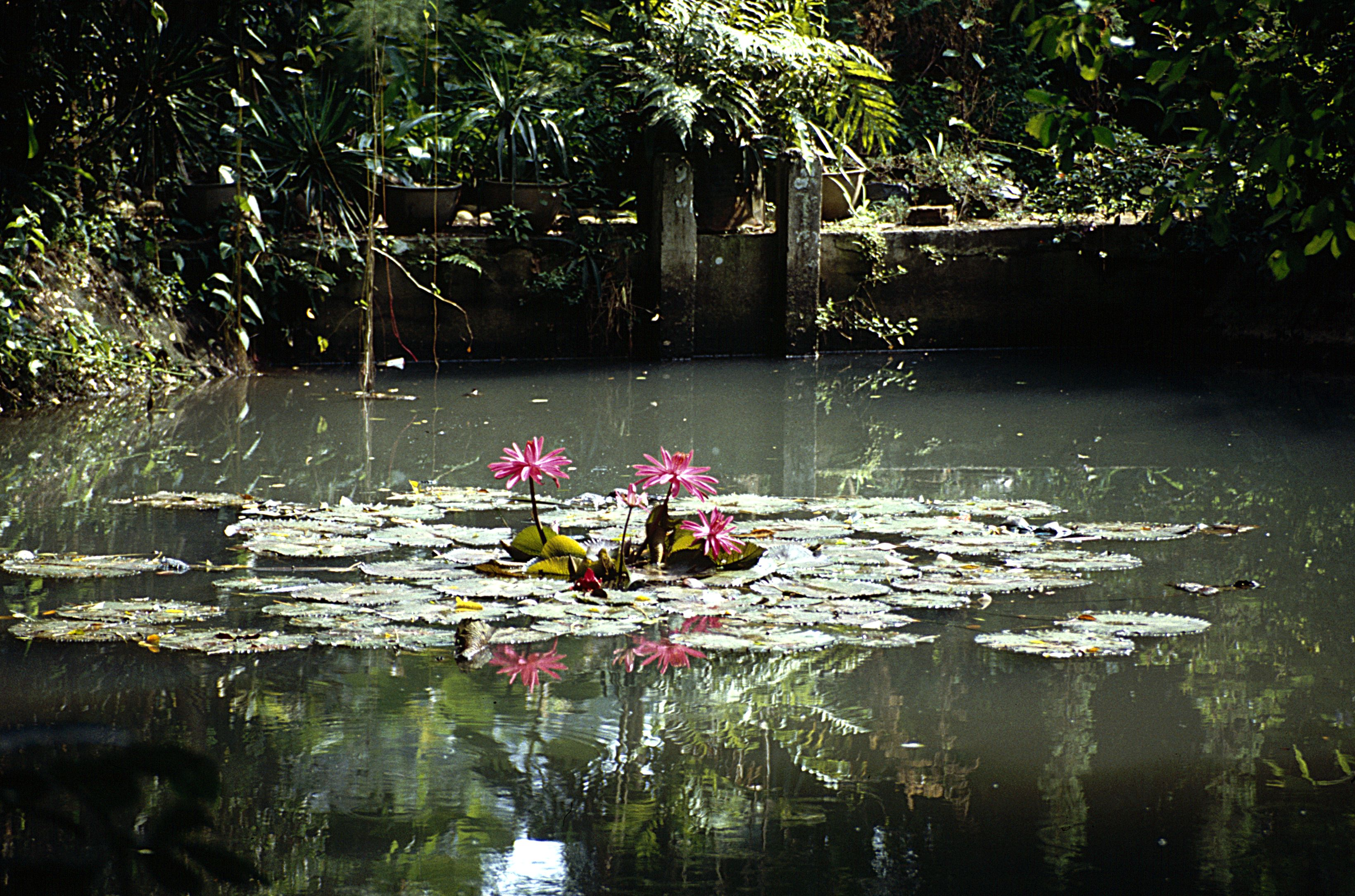
Water lilies in pond

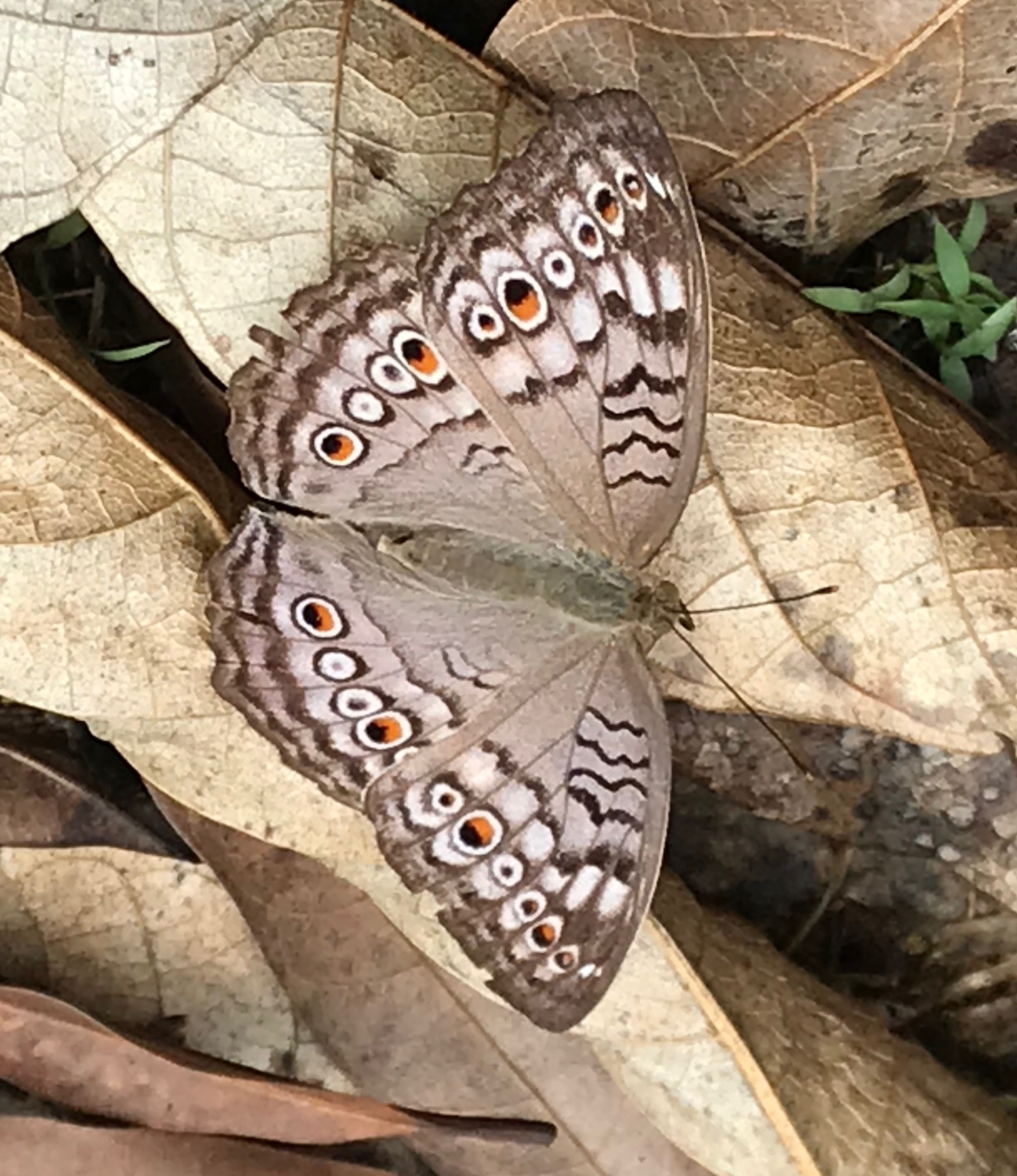
Grey pansy (Junonia atlites)

== See also ==
- Bogor Palace
- Bogor Cathedral
- Bogor Agricultural University
- List of botanical gardens in Indonesia
