= Purwodadi Botanical Garden =

Indonesian botanical garden

Coordinates: 7.80°S 112.74°E

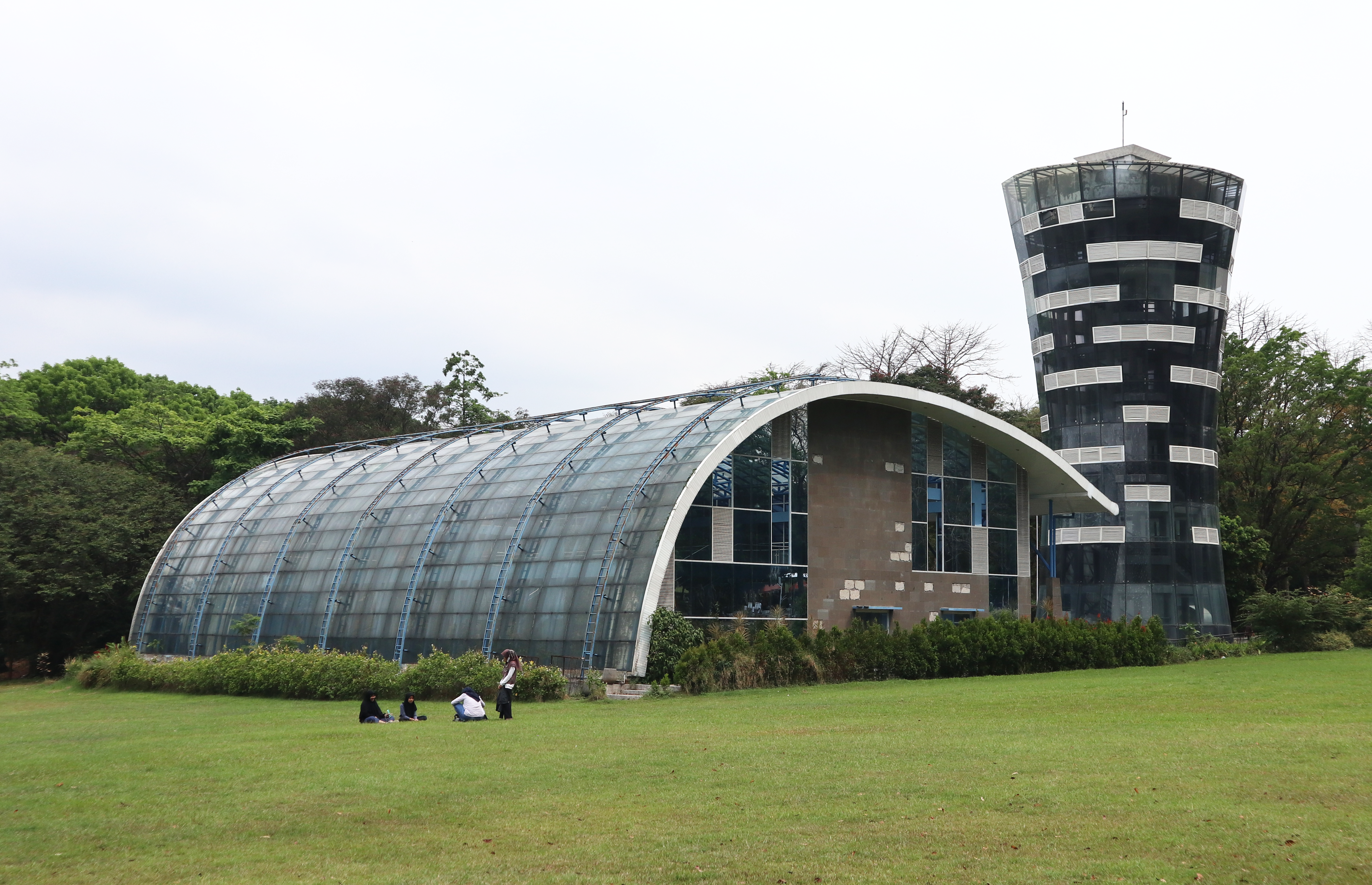
Purwodadi Botanical Gardens (Observation Tower & Greenhouse)

Purwodadi Botanic Garden is a research centre in Purwodadi, Pasuruan, East Java, Indonesia. It has an area of 85 hectares (210 acres) and more than 10,000 types of trees and many plant collections. Callus cultures of Agave amaniensis by Setia Dewi were taken in 1988.

== History ==
The garden was established on January 30, 1941 by Dr. Gerhard Lourens Baas Becking Marinus from the initiative of Dr. Dirk Fok van Slooten as a division of Bogor Botanic Gardens. This garden is one of the three branches of the Botanic Gardens of Indonesia, with each having specific tasks and functions. The two other branches are Cibodas Botanic Garden and Bali Botanic Garden. Management of the entire botanical garden branch is under the responsibility of the Indonesian Institute of Sciences.

Initially, the gardens were used for plantation crop research activities. Then in 1954 the basics of a botanic garden began to be applied, with the establishment of patches of plant collections. From 1980 most of the plants were reorganized according to the Engler classification system. Purwodadi is a major centre of research on plant conservation and plants of dry climates in the tropics.

== Collections ==
=== Legumes ===
The legume collection is classified into three parts: Mimosaceae, Caesalpiniaceae, and Papilionaceae. There are 70 genera included in these groups. Various types of legumes are used as ornamental plants such as species from the genera Amherstia, Brownea, Cassia, Senna, and Saraca. In addition, some types of wood are also used for buildings such as rosewood (Dalbergia latifolia) and Wangkal (Albizia procera), and roadside greening plants such as Angsana (Pterocarpus indicus), Acacia (Acacia auriculiformis) and Soga (Peltophorum pterocarpum). Some are used as medicinal plants such as johar (Senna siamea), kedawung (Parkia timoriana), and Dadap srep (Erythrina subumbrans).

=== Orchids ===
Purwodadi's orchids are kept in greenhouse conditions adjusted to their natural habitat. There are about 2,344 specimens of wild orchids, which consist of 319 species and 69 genera. About 7 species are endemic to East Java such as Appendicula imbricata, Arcuatum dendrobium and Paphiopedilum glaucophyllum. Among others are endangered species such as Ascocentrum miniatum, Phalaenopsis amabilis, Coelogyne pandurata from Kalimantan and others.

=== Palms ===
The Purwodadi collection of palms contains some 60 genera, 117 species and 435 individuals.

=== Bamboo ===
About 30 species of bamboo have been collected by Purwodadi, 16 species from Java, two from Maluku, two from Sulawesi, and 10 from several Asian countries (China, Japan, Thailand, India, and Burma). Gigantochloa manggong (manggong bamboo) is an endemic bamboo of East Java; Gigantochloa lear (pring lear) is often used for furniture, crafts or roofs; Dendrocalamus asper (pring petung) is used for its edible shoots, and Schizostachyum silicatum (bamboo wuluh) to make flutes.

=== Ferns ===
The fern collection lies beneath a patch of larger trees and is shady, as these plants grow best in shade and damp. The collection comprises 36 genera and 21 species. Among these are the spikes bird's nest (Asplenium nidus), maidenhair fern (Adiantum spp.), Lygodium circinnatum, and Platycerium coronarium. Some of the species contain useful properties, for example Athyrium esculentum has edible shoots, Asplenium sp. and Adiantum sp. are used as ornamental plants, horsetail Equisetum debile is used as a medical treatment, and Lygodium circinnatum for craft materials.

=== Medicinal plants ===
The medicinal plant collection includes species such as Morinda citrifolia, a fruit used for cough medicine and high blood pressure, purple leaf (Graptophyllum pictum), of which the leaves are used to cure hemorrhoids, Widoro upas (Merremia mammosa), a tuber used to remedy diabetes, Sembung (Blumea balsamifera) from the which leaves are used for asthma and heart disease medications, and Wudani (Quisqualis indica) which leaves are used for de-worming.

== Tourism and recreation ==
Purwodadi Botanic Garden can be explored by foot, on a rented bicycle, or by private car. Visitors can also utilise a small train. Outside of Purwodadi Botanic Garden, there are other tourist attractions such as Coban Baung waterfall on the eastern side. A visit to the gardens can be incorporated into an East Java nature weekend. The gardens can be visited on the way up to or back from Mount Bromo. Other mountains in the surrounding area are Mount Arjuno and Mount Kawi, while another attraction close to the gardens is the Wonosari Tea Plantation.

Purwodadi Botanic Garden is a place for respite from the hustle and bustle of Surabaya. It can be visited on the way to the town of Malang and also features a cafe serving traditional Javanese cuisine.

== See also ==
- Hendrik de Wit
- List of botanical gardens in Indonesia
