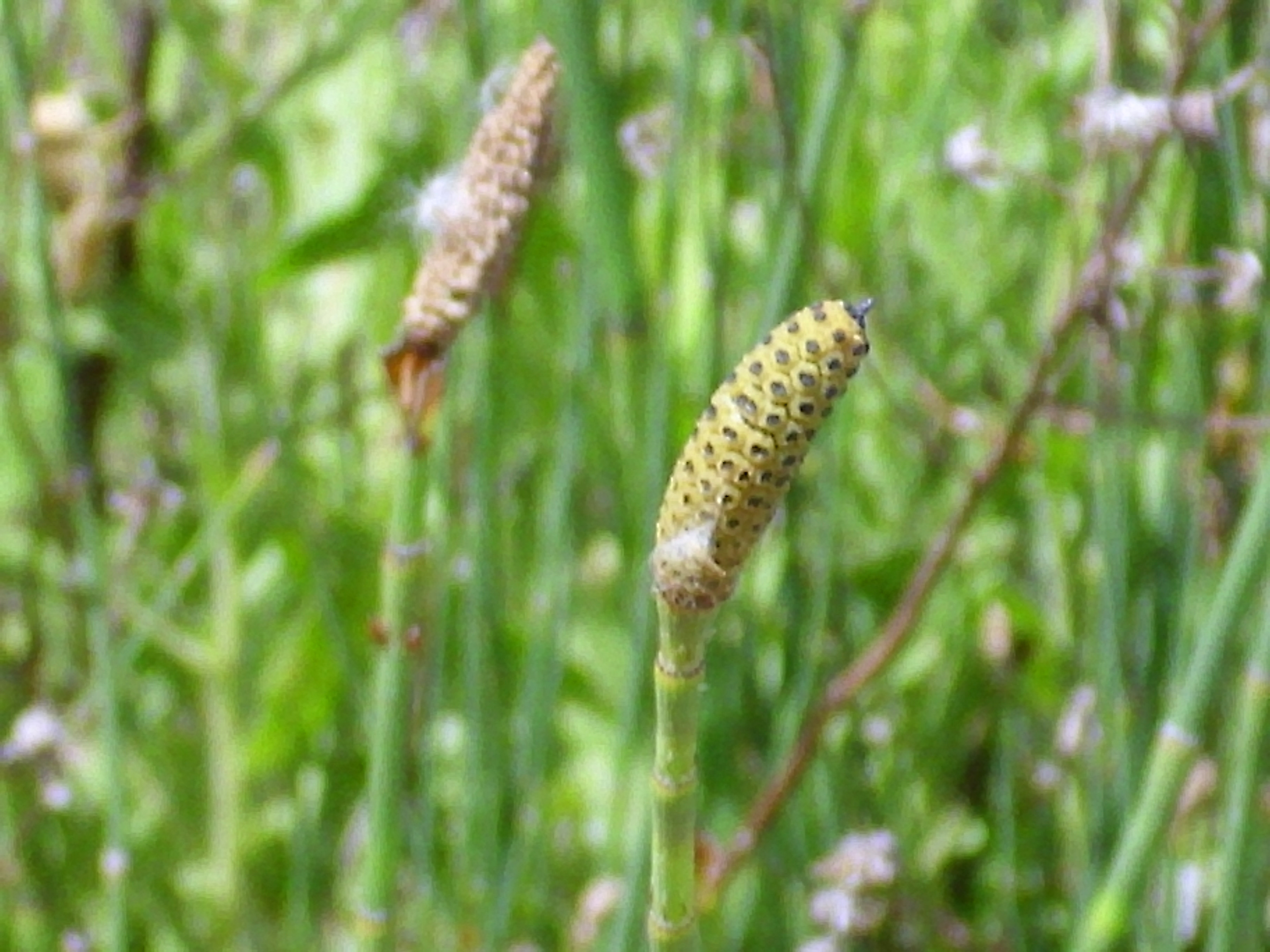

Conservation status
- Least Concern (IUCN 3.1)

Scientific classification
- Kingdom: Plantae
- Clade: Tracheophytes
- Division: Polypodiophyta
- Class: Polypodiopsida
- Subclass: Equisetidae
- Order: Equisetales
- Family: Equisetaceae
- Genus: Equisetum
- Subgenus: E. subg. Hippochaete
- Species: E. ramosissimum

Binomial name
- Equisetum ramosissimum Desf.

Subspecies
- E. ramosissimum var. ramosissimum; E. ramosissimum var. huegelii (syn. E. ramosissimum subsp. debile, E. debile)

= Equisetum ramosissimum =

Species of plant in the horsetail family

Equisetum ramosissimum Desf., known as branched horsetail, is a species of evergreen horsetail (genus Equisetum, subgenus Hippochaete).

== Description ==
Horsetail with untidy branches from the lower parts (which may be prominent or not apparent), with or without main upright stems, able to form a colony from underground roots. Rocky ground tends to constrict root-spread and favours a bushy appearance, unrocky ground favours more slender plants arising from spreading roots, and trampling or cutting affects shape. The general colour may have a blue-grey tinge, sometimes quite strongly, the stem when broad is fairly hollow and compressible, narrower branches rather tough and wiry, the stem ridges are conspicuous (not fine and obscure) and slightly rough. The fertile cones when visible are from stems arising as part of the main plant (not arising early separately) and have pointed cone tips (sometimes obscure).

Habitat: Damp places (stream banks, moist meadows, watered edges, path edges) and shingle.

== Varieties and ranges ==
- Equisetum ramosissimum var. ramosissimum (syn. subsp. ramosissimum) has more obvious branching and persistent sheath teeth – Europe (except far N), W and S Asia, Africa (except mid-west), with some local introduction in the US.
- Equisetum ramosissimum var. huegelii (Milde) Christenh. & Husby (syns. subsp. debile, E. debile) inconspicuously branched, with sheath teeth falling early or persistent – SE Asia to Indonesia and Papua New Guinea

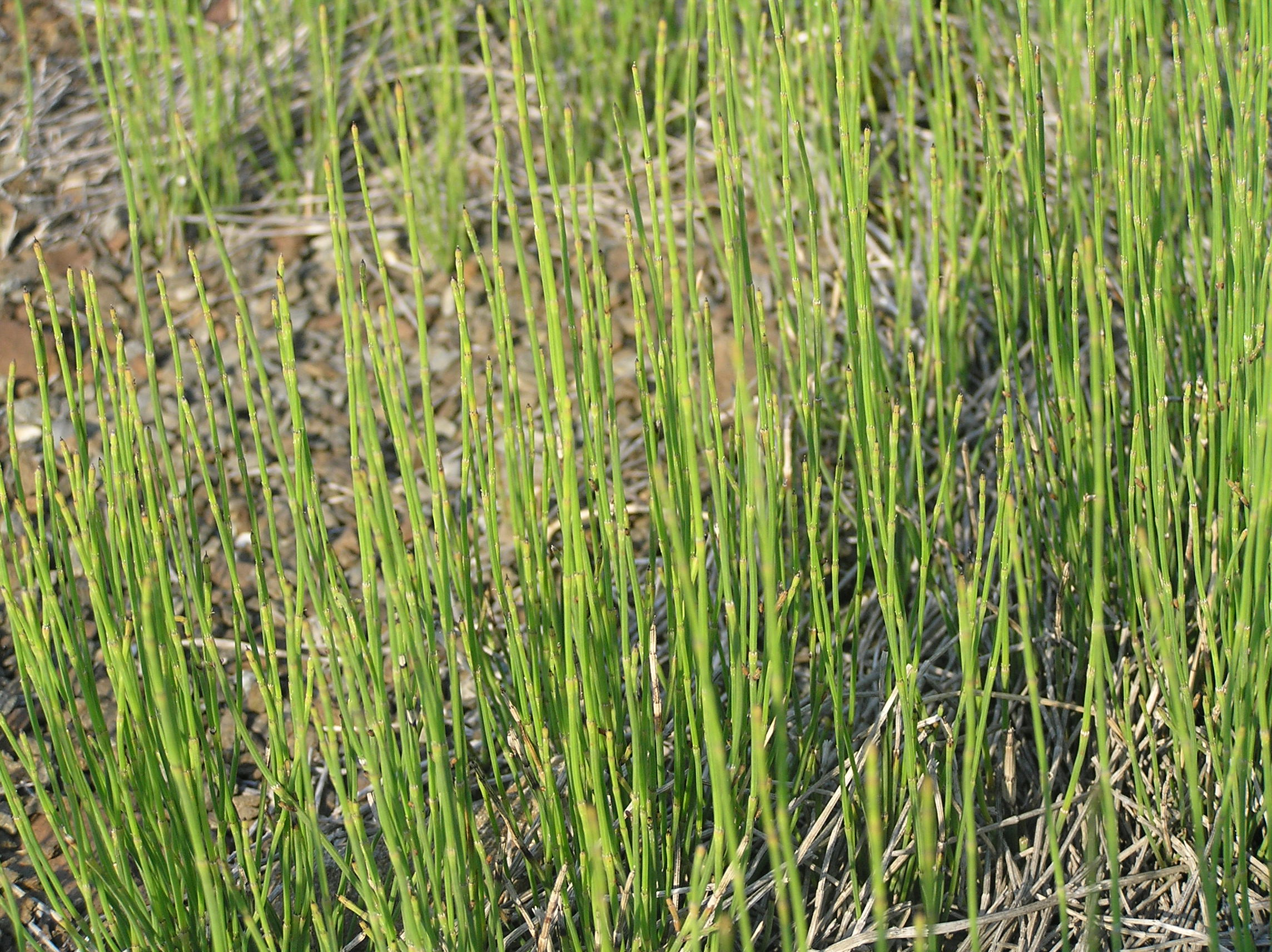
Vegetative growth
