= Willem Marius Docters van Leeuwen =

Dutch botanist and entomologist

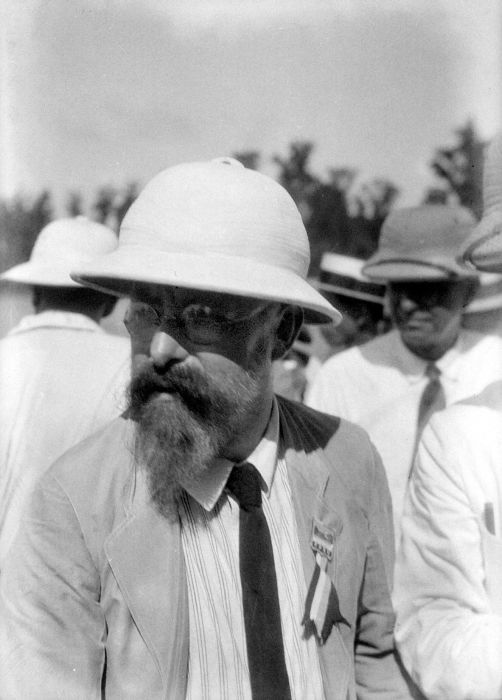
W.M.D. van Leeuwen in 1929

Willem Marius Docters van Leeuwen (16 March 1880 – 25 February 1960) was a Dutch botanist and entomologist who worked in the Dutch colony in Indonesia, where he was prominent for conducting studies on insect–plant interactions as well as for his long-term studies on the island of Krakatoa.

Van Leeuwen was born in Batavia, Indonesia and was educated at the University of Amsterdam. He graduated in 1905 and received a PhD in 1907. He went to Salatiga, Central Java as an entomologist in 1908 and was also a school teacher in Semarang and later Bandung. He studied galls, ant–plant symbioses, pollination biology, montane flora and floral succession on the islands of Krakatoa over the course of a long period. He collaborated with his wife, Jenny Docters van Leeuwen-Reijnvaan, on several publications on plant galls. In 1918 he became director of the Bogor Botanical Gardens, working until 1932. He took part in the American-Dutch expedition into New Guinea in 1926. He returned to the Netherlands in 1932 and settled in Leersum. He published the results of his studies as a monograph "Krakatau 1883-1933" in 1936. He served as a professor of tropical biology at the University of Amsterdam from 1942 to 1950, where he was popularly known as "uncle doc".
