= Carl Ludwig Blume =

German-Dutch botanist (1796–1862)

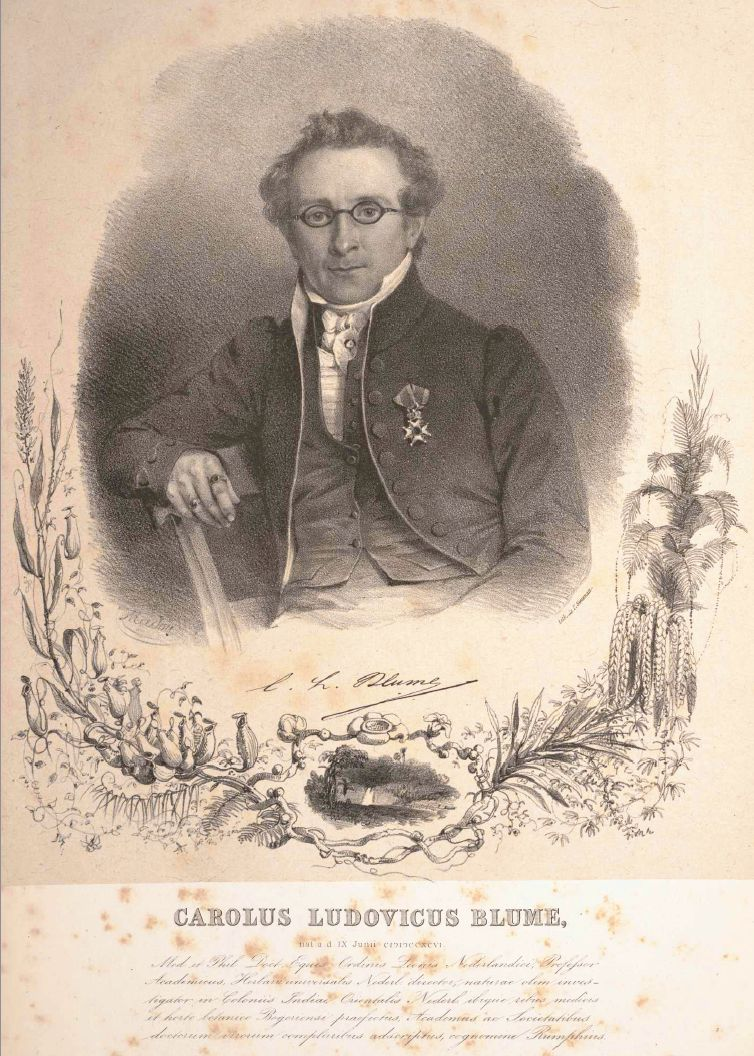
- Born: 9 June 1796; Braunschweig, Germany
- Died: 3 February 1862 (aged 65); Leiden, Netherlands
- Other names: Karl Ludwig von Blume, Karel Lodewijk Blume
- Scientific career
- Fields: Botany, Entomology
- Institutions: Bogor Botanical Gardens, Java; Rijksherbarium, Leiden
- Author abbrev. (botany): Blume

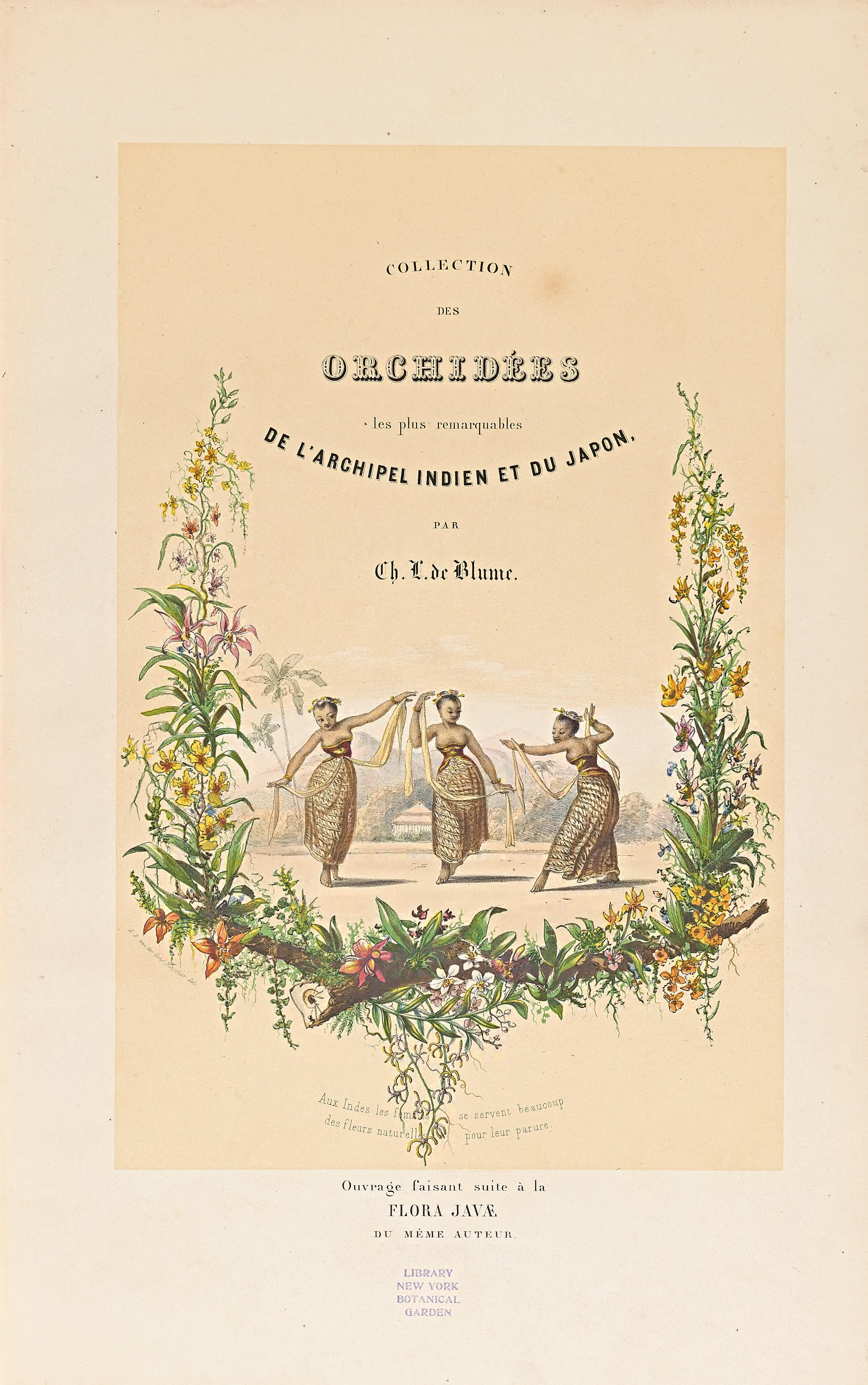
Title page of Collection des Orchidées les plus remarquables de l'archipel Indien et du Japon

Charles Ludwig de Blume or Karl Ludwig von Blume (9 June 1796 – 3 February 1862) was a German-Dutch botanist and entomologist who spent most of his professional life in the Netherlands and the Dutch East Indies. As deputy director of agriculture at the Bogor Botanical Gardens in Java (1823–1826) and later director of the Rijksherbarium in Leiden, he conducted extensive studies of Southeast Asian flora, publishing numerous influential works including Bijdragen tot de flora van Nederlandsch Indië (1825–1827) and Rumphia (1835–1849). Together with Philipp Franz von Siebold, Blume co-founded the Royal Society for the Encouragement of Horticulture in the Netherlands in 1842, helping to revitalise the country's reputation as a centre for botanical study and exotic plant cultivation. His scientific contributions were recognised with his election as a foreign member of the Royal Swedish Academy of Sciences in 1855, and his legacy is commemorated in the botanical journal Blumea, which bears his name.

== Biography ==
Blume was born at Braunschweig in Germany, but studied at Leiden University and spent his professional life working in the Dutch East Indies and in the Netherlands, where he was Director of the Rijksherbarium (state herbarium) at Leiden. His name is sometimes given in the Dutch language form Karel Lodewijk Blume, but the original German spelling is the one most widely used in botanical texts: even then there is confusion, as he is sometimes referred to as K.L. Blume (from Karl).

He carried out extensive studies of the flora of southern Asia, particularly in Java, then a colony of the Netherlands. From 1823 to 1826 Blume was Deputy Director of Agriculture at the Bogor Botanical Gardens in Java. In 1827 he became correspondent of the Royal Institute of the Netherlands. In 1855, he was elected a foreign member of the Royal Swedish Academy of Sciences. The botanical journal Blumea is named after him.

== Horticultural activities ==
In 1839, while serving as director of the Leiden Rijksherbarium (now part of Naturalis Biodiversity Center), Carl Ludwig Blume entered into a partnership with Philipp Franz von Siebold, the horticulturist Johannes Cornelis Rodbard and the botanist Jacques Pierot to import living plants from Japan and the Dutch East Indies. Following Pierot's untimely death in 1841 and Rodbard's withdrawal in 1843, Blume and von Siebold found themselves responsible not only for sourcing and cultivating rare specimens, but also for selling them to a growing network of Dutch growers at discounted rates to help revive the national trade in exotic ornamentals.

Building on this endeavour, Blume and von Siebold formally established the Royal Society for the Encouragement of Horticulture in the Netherlands (Koninklijke Nederlandsche Maatschappij tot aanmoediging van den Tuinbouw) in 1842. The Society aimed to restore the country's 17th‑ and 18th‑century renown as a centre for the world's finest gardens by organising annual plant exhibitions and circulating newly introduced species among its members. Blume served as one of the Society's first directors and helped draft its founding statutes and price lists for imported plants. In 1844 he sold his share of the venture to von Siebold and resigned as director the following year, having laid the groundwork for what would become a key institution in Dutch horticultural history.

== Publications ==
- Carl Ludwig Blume: "Catalogus van eenige der merkwaardigste zoo in- als uitheemse gewassen, te vinden in 's Lands Plantentuin te Buitenzorg" opgemaakt door C. L. Blume, M.D., Directeur van voorz. tuin. s.l. n.d. [Batavia 1823]. (Catalogue of some native and exotic plants in Buitenzorg)
- Carl Ludwig Blume: Bijdragen tot de flora van Nederlandsch Indië .... 1825–1827 (Contributions to the flora of the Dutch Indies) on Botanicus
- Blume, Carl Ludwig (1827–1830). Enumeratio plantarum Javae et insularum adjacentium : minus cognitarum vel novarum ex herbariis Reinwardtii, Kuhlii, Hasseltii et Blumii (in Latin). Leiden: van Leeuwen.
- Carl Ludwig Blume & Johannes B. Fischer (? – 1832): Flora Javae nec non insularum adjacentium .... 1828–1851.
- Carl Ludwig Blume: De novis quibusdam plantarum familiis expositio et olim jam expositarum enumeratio. (1833)
- Carl Ludwig Blume: Rumphia, sive commentationes botanicae imprimis de plantis Indiae orientalis .... 1835–1849 (4 volumes with 170 illustrations)
- Carl Ludwig Blume: Museum botanicum Lugduno-Batavum .... 1849–1857 on Botanicus
- Carl Ludwig Blume: Flora Javae et insularum adjacentium nova series (1858–1859)
- Carl Ludwig Blume: Collection des Orchidées les plus remarquables de l'Archipel Indien et du Japon (1858–1859).

The standard author abbreviation Blume is used to indicate this person as the author when citing a botanical name.
