= Rembangan =

Coordinates: 8°4′41.42″S 113°41′25.62″E

Rembangan is a tourist attraction in Jember, East Java. Located at the foot of Mount Argopuro, the complex is known for its panoramic views and dragonfruit orchards.

== Location and facilities ==
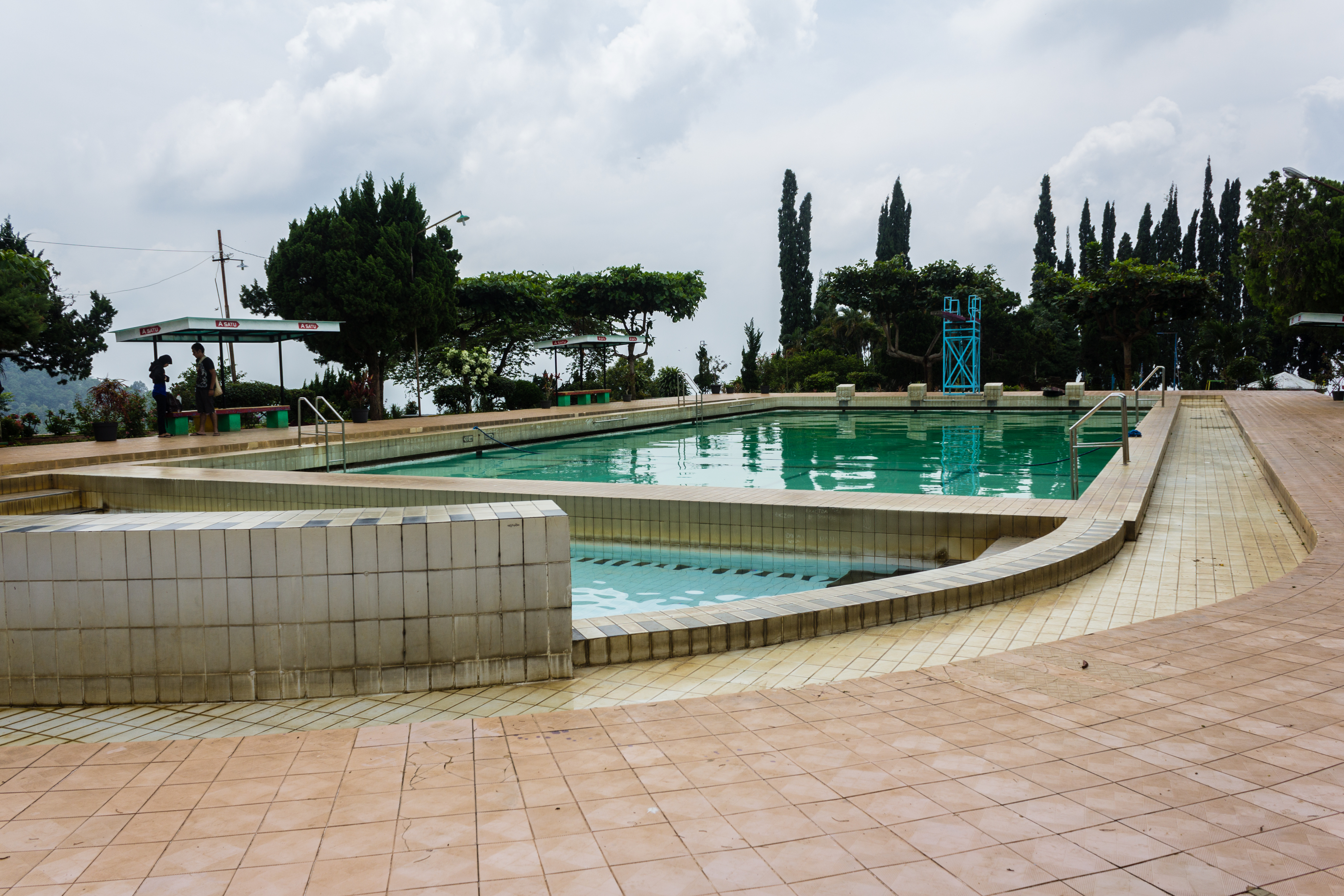
The pool at the hotel

Rembangan is located approximately 12 kilometres (7.5 mi) north of Jember City, at the foot of Mount Argopuro. It consists of 13.45 hectares (33.2 acres) of land at an altitude of 650 metres (2,130 ft) above sea level. The average temperature is between 18 °C (64 °F) and 25 °C (77 °F). Administratively, it is part of Kemuning Lor Village, Arjasa District, Jember, East Java. The site is managed by the Jember regional government.

The road to Rembangan has many dragonfruit orchards along it. There are also several coffee plantations in the area, which are open to the public on working days. As of 2011 there is no public transport to the peak, although motorcycles or cars can be rented for the journey. The road, with its many turns and sharp drops, is dangerous for large busses, and fatal accidents have occurred; one, in 2002, caused the deaths of 22 passengers.

In Rembangan there is a hotel, built during the Dutch colonial period, which has 41 rooms. The hotel and its environs, including a pool and gardens, are used for rest and relaxation. On the grounds of the hotel is a dragonfruit orchard with approximately 600 plants; the fruit may be picked, for a fee; the area's dragonfruit is among the most commons souvenirs bought there. The hotel provides accommodations for tourists as well as conferences, seminars, and workshops. Other facilities include a spring, for bathing.

The view from the peak is considered Rembangan's greatest attraction. Laili Damayanti of Tabloid Nova writes that the night-time view is the more popular one, and Icha Rahmanti of The Jakarta Post describes the view as "terrific".

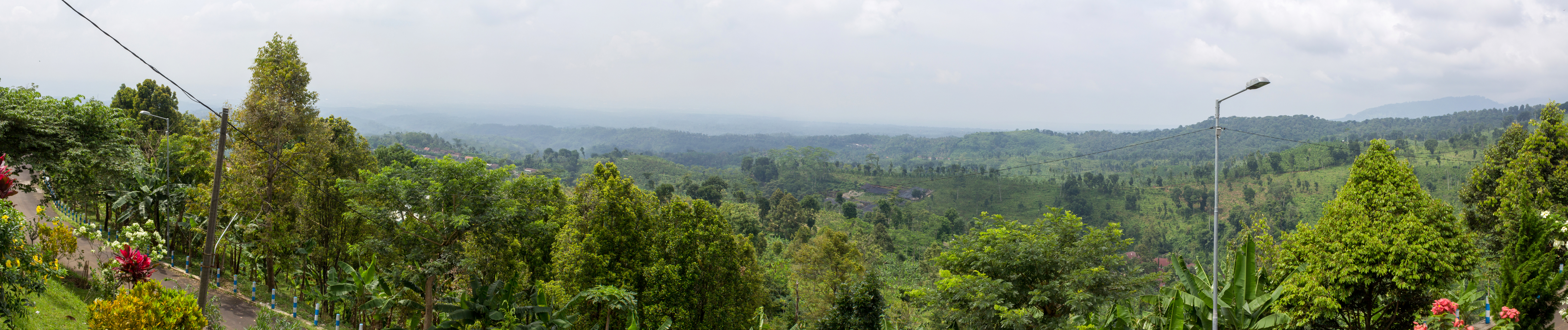
Panoramic view from the peak

== History ==
During the 2012 Christmas holiday, Rembangan was one of Jember's most popular tourist attractions, together with Papuma Beach and the Sukorambi Botanical Garden.

In 2013 the Jember police, following up on complaints that temporary food kiosks on the road to Rembangan were being used for "immoral" ("asusila") activities, began removing these stalls.

== Works cited ==
- "Bus Masuk Jurang 22 Tewas Seketika" [Bus Goes Over a Cliff, 22 Die Instantly]. Suara Merdeka (in Indonesian). 3 July 2002. Archived from the original on 22 February 2014.
- Damayanti, Laili (22 October 2011). "Eksplorasi Kota Jember, Eksotika Wisata di Timur Jawa (2)" [Exploring Jember, the Exotic Tourism in East Java (2)]. Tabloid Nova (in Indonesian). Archived from the original on 22 February 2014.
- Luqmanto, Gandhi (21 April 2013). "Puluhan Warung Remang Objek Wisata Rembangan Ditertibkan" [Dozens of Low-Cost Food Kiosks Near Rembangan are Dealt With] (in Indonesian). Radio Republik Indonesia. Archived from the original on 21 February 2014.
- Purba, Arif (7 October 2012). "Segarkan Badan di Kawasan Puncak Rembangan" [Refresh Your Body at the Rembangan Mountain Resort]. Jaring News (in Indonesian). Archived from the original on 22 February 2014.
- Rahmanti, Icha (25 September 2013). "5 Essentials about Jember". The Jakarta Post Travel. Archived from the original on 18 February 2014.
- Solicha, Zumrotun (31 January 2011). "Hotel Wisata Jember Penuh Jelang Tahun Baru" [Tourist Hotels in Jember Filled as the New Year Approaches] (in Indonesian). Antara. Archived from the original on 22 February 2014.
- Solicha, Zumrotun (25 December 2012). "Pengunjung Wisata Jember Meningkat Selama Libur Natal" [Tourism in Jember Sees Increase over Christmas Holidays] (in Indonesian). Antara. Archived from the original on 4 March 2016.
- Solicha, Zumrotun (25 January 2013). "Menikmati Buah Naga di Rembangan" [Enjoy Dragonfruit in Rembangan] (in Indonesian). Antara. Archived from the original on 22 February 2014.
