= Equisetum ramosissimum var. huegelii =

Scientific classification
- Kingdom: Plantae
- Clade: Tracheophytes
- Division: Polypodiophyta
- Class: Polypodiopsida
- Subclass: Equisetidae
- Order: Equisetales
- Family: Equisetaceae
- Genus: Equisetum
- Species: E. ramosissimum
- Variety: E. r. var. huegelii

Trinomial name
- Equisetum ramosissimum var. huegelii (Milde) Christenh. & Husby

Synonyms
- Equisetum debile Roxb. ex Vaucher; Equisetum huegelii Milde; Equisetum ramosissimum var. altissimum (A.Braun) Bir; Equisetum ramosissimum subsp. debile (Roxb. ex Vaucher) Hauke; Equisetum ramosissimum f. debile (Roxb. ex Vaucher) Fraser-Jenk.; Hippochaete debilis (Roxb. ex Vaucher) Holub; Hippochaete ramosissima subsp. debilis (Roxb. ex Vauch.) Á.Löve & D.Löve

Botanical variety of vascular plant

Equisetum ramosissimum var. huegelii, with synonyms including Equisetum debile and Equisetum huegelii, is a variety of Equisetum ramosissimum, a plant in the family Equisetaceae, found in parts of tropical Asia and China.

== Description ==
Equisetum ramosissimum var. huegelii is a spore-bearing herb with erect, cylindrical, and hollow stems. Branches are long, slender, two or three in whorl, ribbed, nodes encircled by a tight sheath of connate scale like leaves. It has oblong strobilus at the end of branches.

== Phenology and reproduction ==
Equisetum ramosissimum var. huegelii vegetatively propagates by the splitting of rhizome. Spore formation occurs in June to July. After dispersal, spores germinate within a few days at humid condition. Gametophytes reproduce protogynous reproduction i.e., formation of female gamete before male one.

== Ecology and distribution ==
Equisetum ramosissimum var. huegelii is distributed in South East Asia, Southern China, India, Nepal, and Sri Lanka. In Nepal, it is found in moist places of the country at 2600 m.

== Uses ==
Equisetum ramosissimum var. huegelii is used in traditional medicine in Nepal. It is applied to treat burns, scabies, malarial fever, gonorrhea, dislocated bones, and liver and chest complaints. There is insufficient scientific evidence for the effectiveness of Equisetum plants as a medicine to treat any human condition.
