= Sukorambi Botanical Garden =

Botanical garden in Indonesia

Coordinates: 8°9′46.17″S 113°39′48.03″E

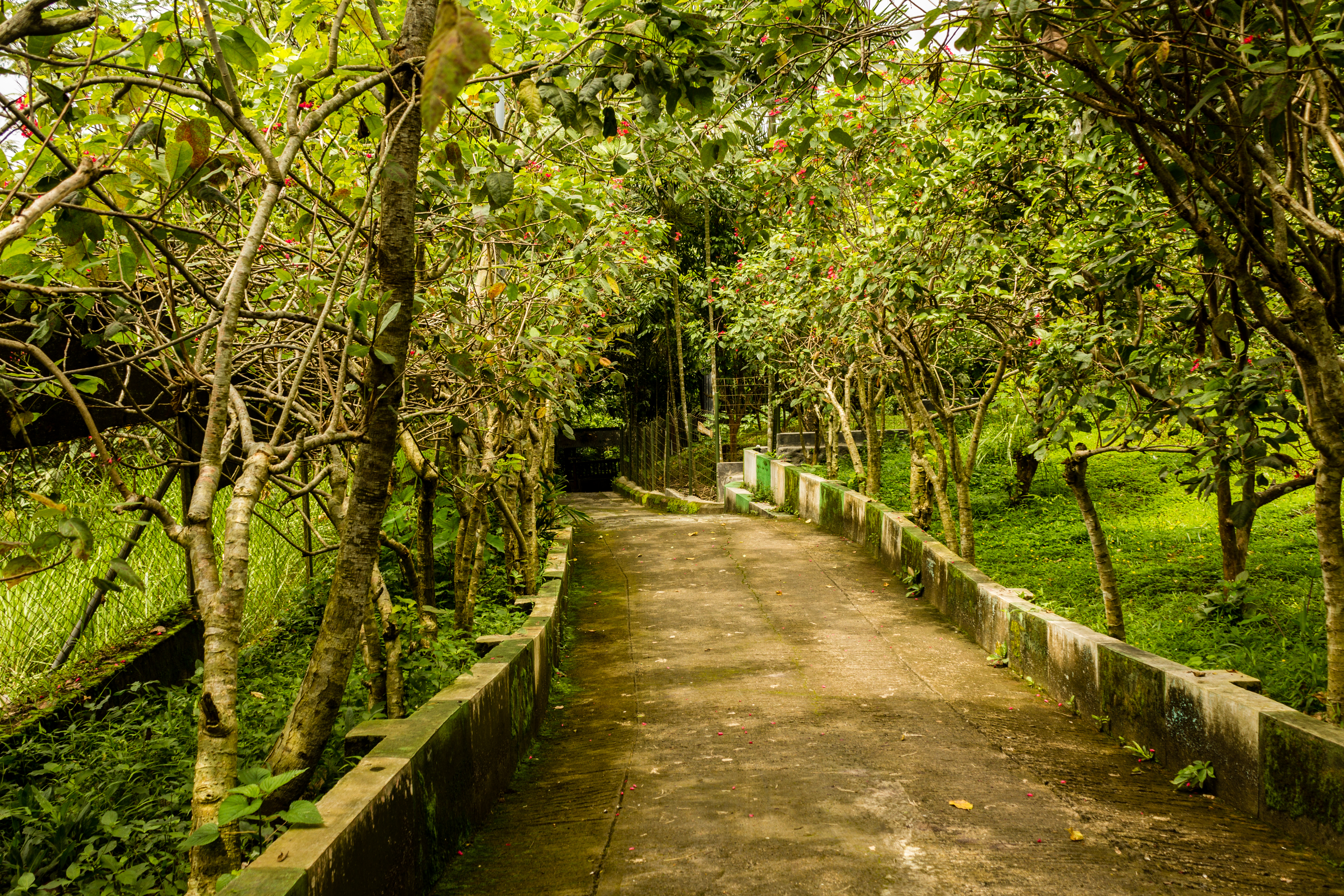
- The footpath connecting the upper and lower portions of the garden
- Interactive map of Sukorambi Botanical Garden
- Location: Surokambi, Jember Regency, East Java
- Area: 8 hectares (20 acres)
- Website: http://www.tamanbotanisukorambi.com/

The Sukorambi Botanical Garden (Indonesian: Taman Botani Sukorambi) is a botanical garden located in Sukorambi, Jember Regency, East Java, Indonesia.

== Location and description ==
The Sukorambi Botanical Garden is located on Mujahir Street, in Sukorambi, Jember, East Java, Indonesia, some 7 kilometres (4.3 mi) west of Jember City. The 8 hectares (20 acres) garden is located on a slope, with the lowest point some 100 metres (330 ft) above sea level.

The top and bottom are connected by both a staircase and a footpath, the latter of which can also be used to convey visitors by motorcycle.

Logo of Sukorambi Botanical Garden

The location is surrounded by rice paddies and includes an extensive forest. Aside from natural attractions, including flora and fauna, the site includes a fishing pond, pools (for adults and children), a two-story cafe and restaurant, a reading center (holding some 500 books and journals), and a meeting hall. Recreational activities include water sports and flying foxes.

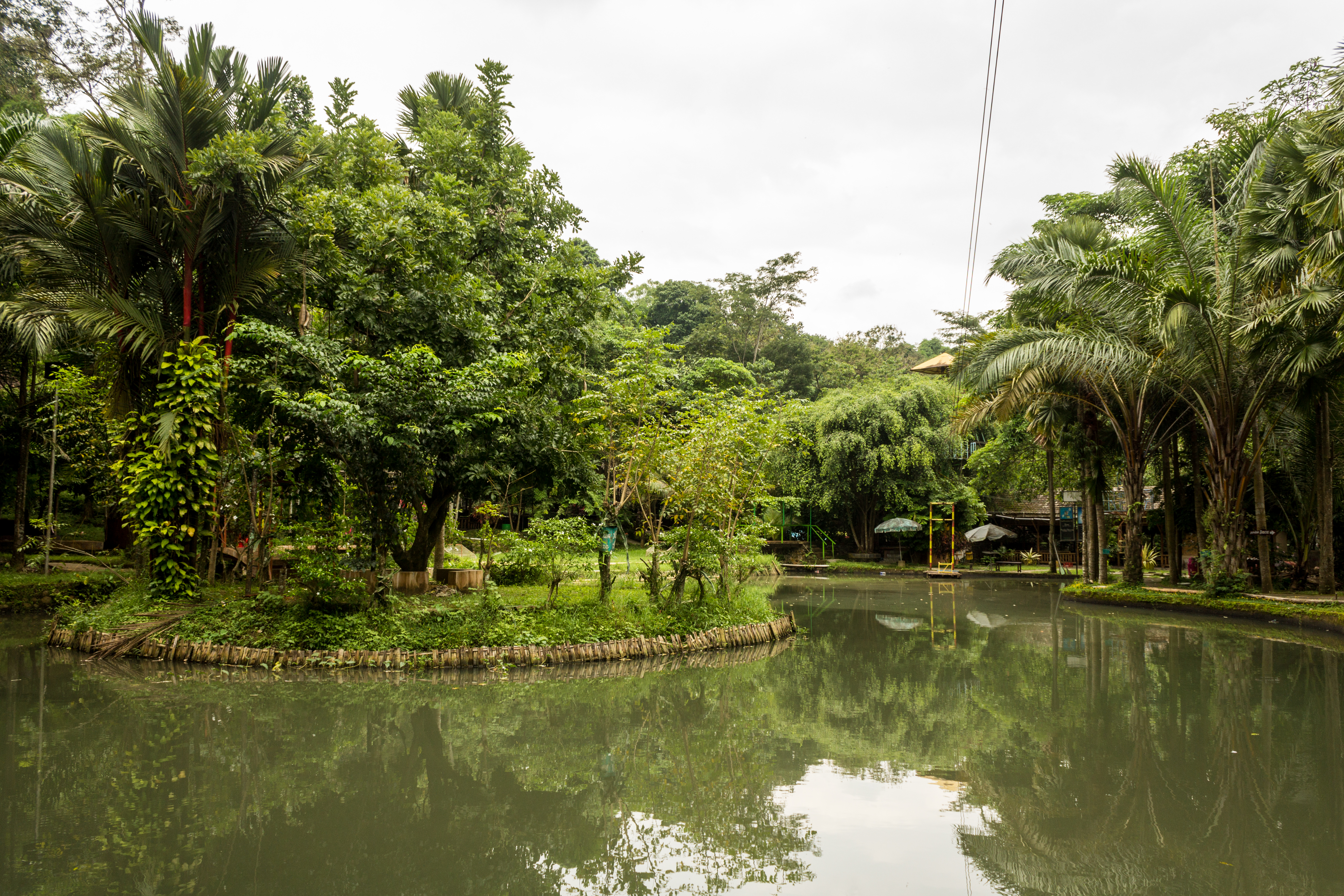
A pond at Sukorambi

The upper part of the garden, covering some 4.5 hectares (11 acres), includes an herb garden with over 300 species of herbs. There are also over 200 species of flowers and fruit trees. A variety of animals, including horses, rabbits, and various types of birds are also present. The names of flora are written in both Latin and Indonesian, for easier identification.

== History ==
Development of the Sukorambi Botanical Garden began in 2006. Initially, the Regent of Jember, Abdul Kahar Muzakir, intended to use it for his family's recreation. However, after receiving input from friends and acquaintances, he ultimately decided to make the garden open to the public. The garden was formally established on 24 February 2007.

The garden had an average of 50 visitors daily in 2011, with numbers increasing to 200 on the weekends. By December 2012 that average had increased to 300 visitors daily, with 1,000 visitors per day visiting during the Christmas holidays. During that holiday the garden was one of Jember's most popular tourist attractions, together with Papuma Beach and Rembangan.

Plants

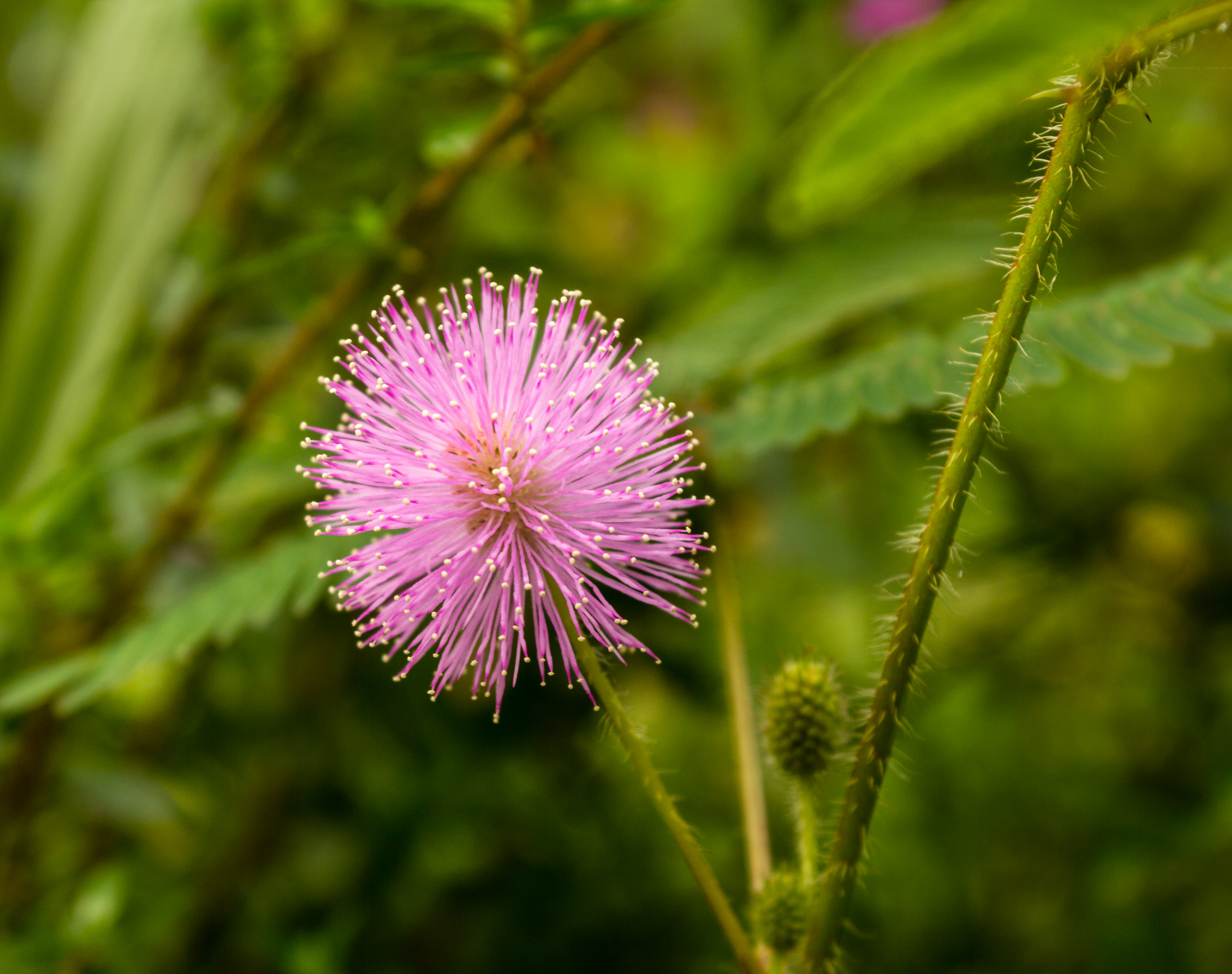
Mimosa pudica, touch-me-not

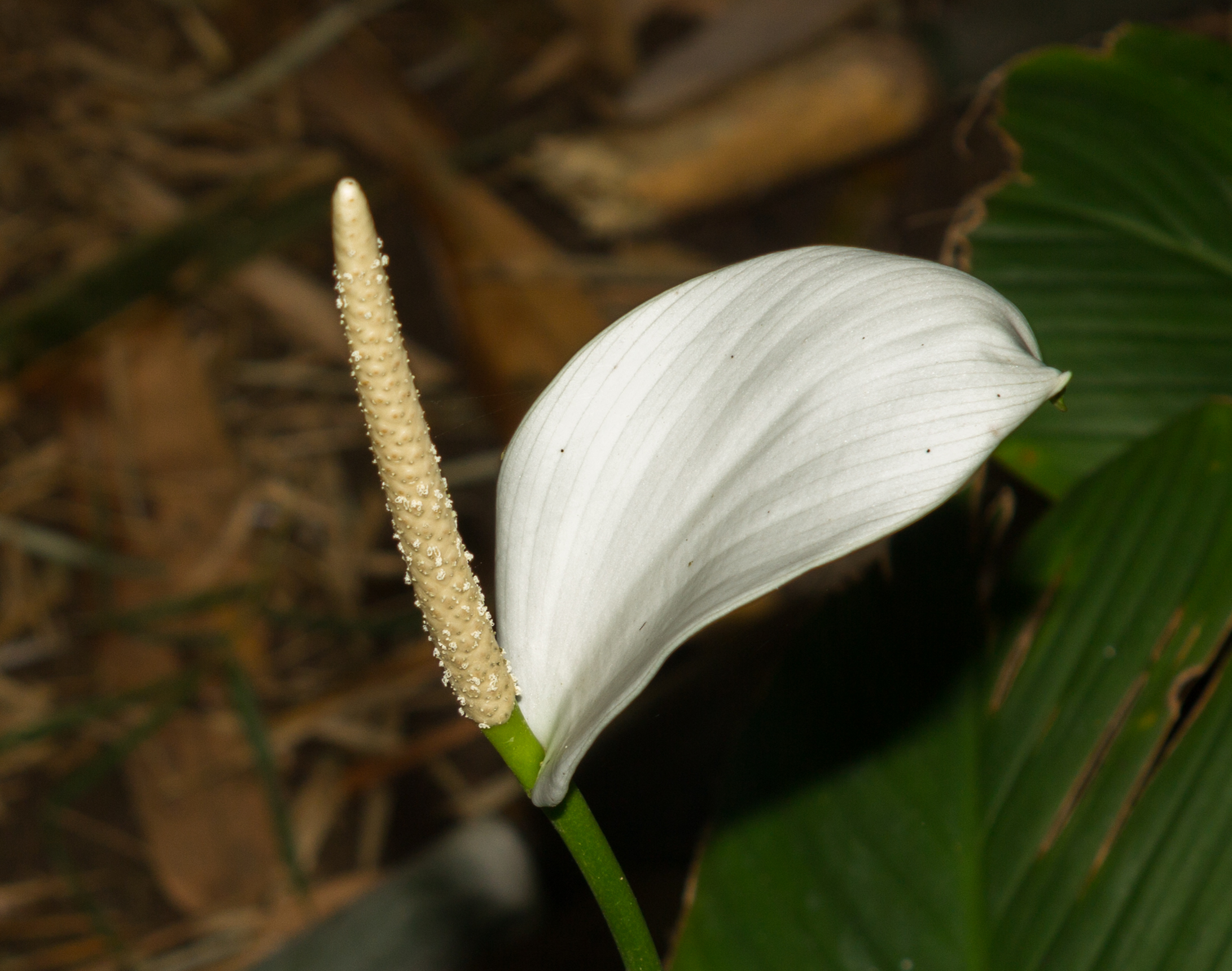
Zantedeschia or Calla lilly

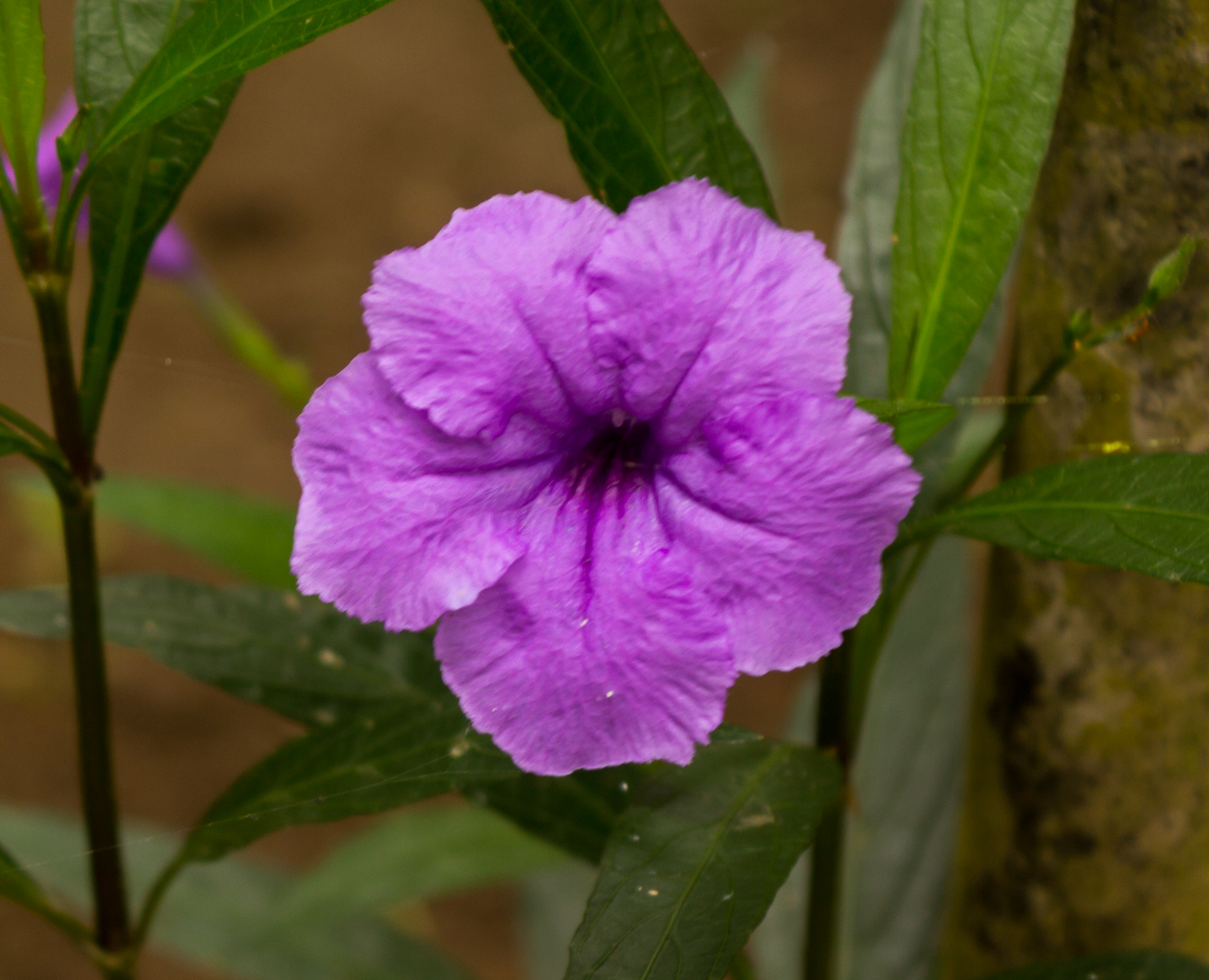
Hibiscus

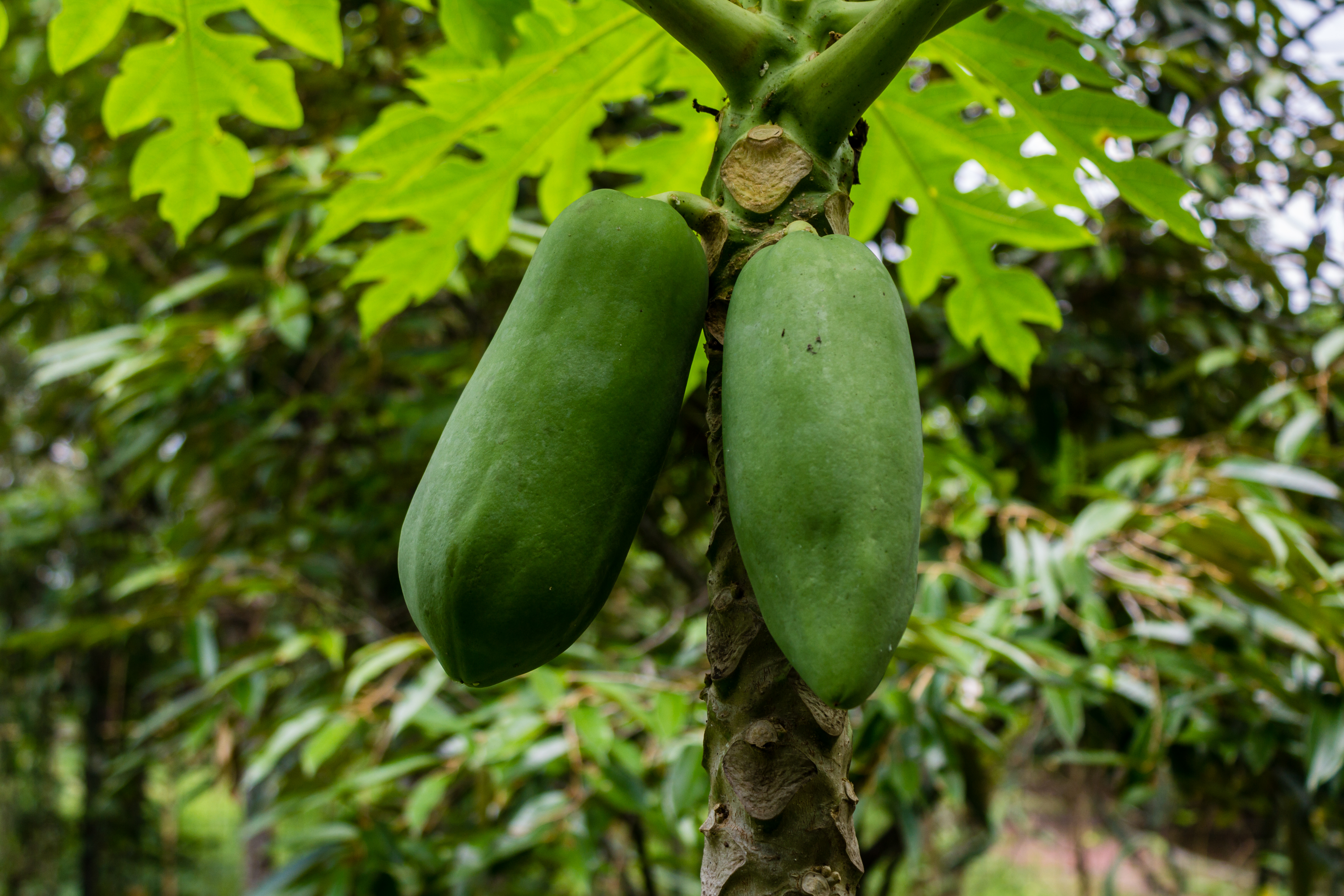
Papaya, unripe

== See also ==
- List of botanical gardens

== Works cited ==
- Djunaidy, Mahbub (21 January 2011). "Menjelajah Alam di Taman Botani" [Exploring Nature at the Botanical Gardens]. Tempo (in Indonesian).
- "Keadaan dan Lokasi" [Conditions and Location] (in Indonesian). Sukorambi Botanical Garden. Archived from the original on 21 February 2014.
- "Peluang Investasi 2012" [2012 Investment Opportunities] (PDF) (in Indonesian). Government of Jember. 2012. Archived from the original (PDF) on 6 February 2014.
- "Peresmian Taman Botani Sukorambi" [Establishment of Sukorambi Botanical Garden] (in Indonesian). Sukorambi Botanical Garden. Archived from the original on 21 February 2014.
- Solicha, Zumrotun (25 December 2012). "Pengunjung Wisata Jember Meningkat Selama Libur Natal" [Tourism in Jember Sees Increase over Christmas Holidays] (in Indonesian). Antara. Archived from the original on 4 March 2016.
