= Cibodas =

- Town and district
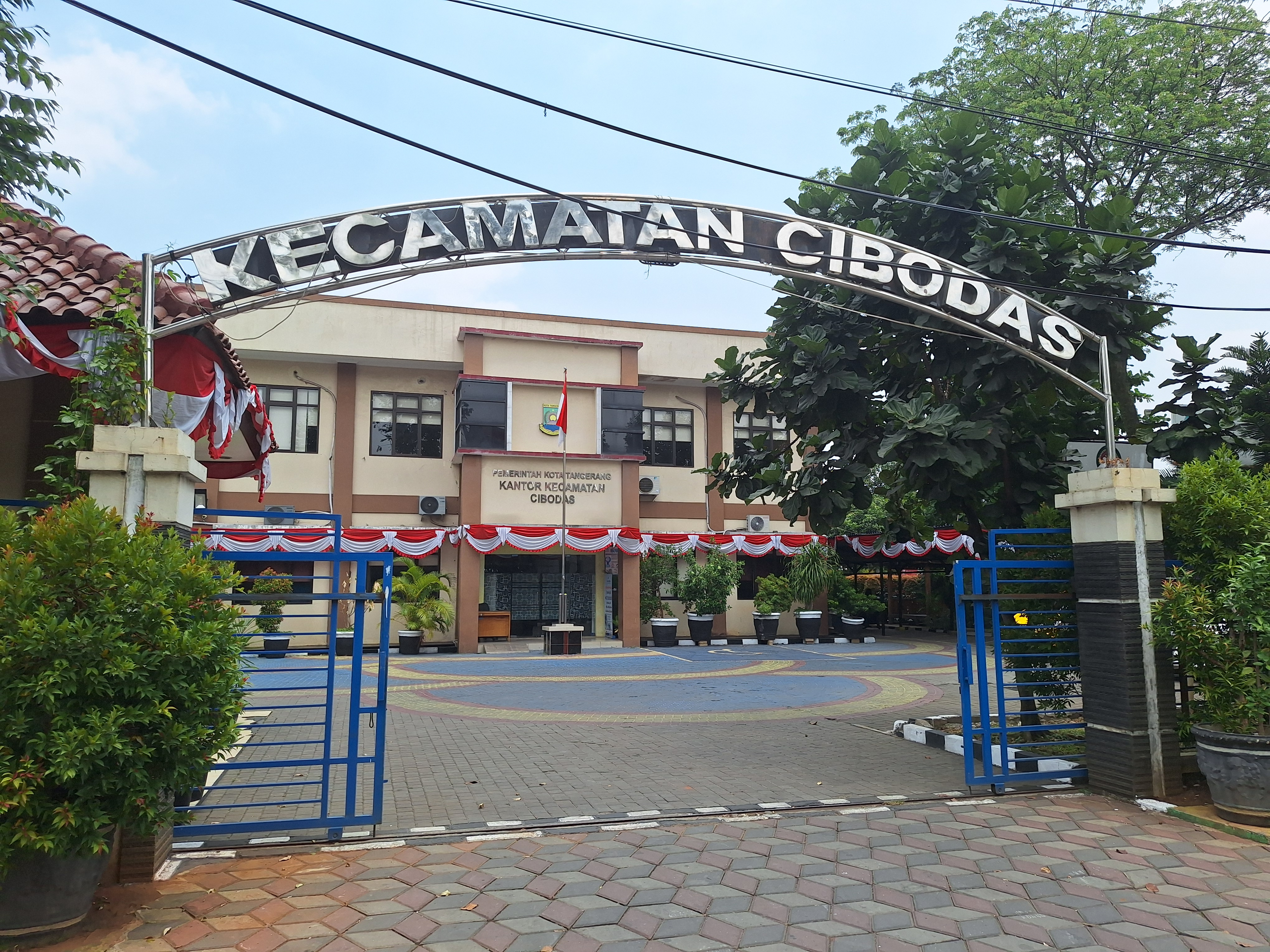
- Cibodas Regent office
- Interactive map of Cibodas
- Country: Indonesia
- Province: Banten
- Municipality: Tangerang City

Area
  - Total: 9.61 km^{2} (3.71 sq mi)

Population (mid 2023 estimate)
  - Total: 158,036
  - Density: 16,400/km^{2} (42,600/sq mi)

Cibodas is a town and an administrative district (kecamatan) of Tangerang City, in Banten Province of Indonesia, on the island of Java. The district covers an area of 9.61 km^{2}, and had a population of 142,479 at the 2010 Census and 147,279 at the 2020 Census; the official estimate as at mid 2023 was 158,036.

== Communities ==
Cibodas District is sub-divided into six urban communities (kelurahan), listed below with their areas and their officially-estimated populations as at mid 2022, together with their postcodes.

Kode Wilayah	Name of kelurahan	Area in km^{2}	Population mid 2022 estimate	Post code
36.71.09.1001	Cibodas (town)	1.53	30,927	15138
36.71.09.1002	Cibodasari	0.97	35,269	15138
36.71.09.1003	Cibodas Baru	0.88	20,345	15138
36.71.09.1004	Panunggangan Barat	3.11	23,045	15139
36.71.09.1005	Uwung Jaya	2.02	31,493	15138
36.71.09.1006	Jatiuwung	1.10	16,573	15134
36.71.09	Totals	9.61	157,652 ^{(a)}	

Notes: (a) comprising 78,892 males and 78,760 females.
