= 2022 in paleobotany =

This paleobotany list records new fossil plant taxa that were described during 2022, as well as notes other significant paleobotany discoveries and events which occurred during 2022.

== Algae ==
=== Charophytes ===
Name	Novelty	Status	Authors	Age	Unit	Location	Synonymized taxa	Notes	Images
Lamprothamnium elongatum	Sp. nov	In press	Feist & Floquet	Late Cretaceous		Spain		A charophyte.	
Lamprothamnium ovoideum	Sp. nov	In press	Feist & Floquet	Late Cretaceous		Spain		A charophyte.	
Pseudoharrisichara sedanoensis	Sp. nov	In press	Feist & Floquet	Late Cretaceous		Spain		A charophyte.	

==== Charophyte research ====
- A study on the Paleocene charophyte flora from the South Gobi area in the Junggar Basin (China) and on the Paleogene fossil record of charophytes is published by Cao et al. (2022), who interpret their findings as evidence of the dispersal of charophyte lineages from Asia to Europe in the middle to late Eocene, possibly facilitated by waterbirds.

=== Chlorophytes ===
Name	Novelty	Status	Authors	Age	Type locality	Location	Notes	Images
Ardeiporella	Gen. et comb. nov	Valid	Grgasović	Middle Triassic		Bosnia and Herzegovina	A green alga belonging to the group Dasycladales. Genus includes "Oligoporella" karrerioidea Pia (1935).	
Earltonella	Gen. et sp. nov		LoDuca in LoDuca et al.	Silurian (Llandovery)	Earlton Formation	Canada (Ontario)	A green alga belonging to the group Bryopsidales. Genus includes new species E. fredricksi.	
Milanovicella? canadillana	Sp. nov	In press	Torromé & Schlagintweit	Late Cretaceous (Santonian–Campanian)		Spain	A green alga belonging to the group Dasycladales.	
Neophysoporella	Gen. et comb. nov	Valid	Grgasović	Late Triassic, possibly also Middle Triassic		France	A green alga belonging to the group Dasycladales. Genus includes "Diplopora" lotharingica Benecke (1898), "Physoporella" jomdaensis Flügel & Mu (1982) and "Physoporella" zamparelliae Parente & Climaco (1999).	
Protocodium	Gen. et sp. nov		Chai, Aria & Hua	Ediacaran	Dengying Formation	China	A green alga belonging to the family Codiaceae. Genus includes new species P. sinense.	
Succodium luciae	Sp. nov	Valid	Vachard & Krainer	Permian-Triassic transition		Italy	A green alga belonging to the group Dasycladales.	

== Lycopodiopsida ==
Name	Novelty	Status	Authors	Age	Type locality	Location	Notes	Images
Lepacyclotes ordosensis	Sp. nov	Valid	Deng in Deng et al.	Middle Triassic (Ladinian)	Tongchuan Formation	China	A member of the family Isoetaceae.	
Lycopodicaulis	Gen. et sp. nov	Valid	Herrera et al.	Early Cretaceous (late Barremian–early Aptian)	Huolinhe Formation	China	A member of the family Lycopodiaceae. Genus includes new species L. oellgaardii.	
Multapicifolium	Gen. et sp. nov	Valid	Edwards, Li & Berry	Early Devonian		China	A member of Protolepidodendrales of uncertain phylogenetic placement. Genus includes new species M. sinense.	
Nothostigma sepeensis	Sp. nov		Spiekermann, Jasper, Guerra-Sommer & Uhl in Spiekermann et al.	Permian (Cisuralian)		Brazil	A member of Lycopodiopsida of uncertain affinities.	
Omprelostrobus	Gen. et sp. nov		Liu et al.	Devonian (Famennian)	Wutong Formation	China	A member of Isoetales of uncertain affinities. Genus includes new species O. gigas.	
Pleuromeia obovata	Sp. nov		Deng in Deng et al.	Middle Triassic (Ladinian)	Tongchuan Formation	China	A lycopsid.	
Porongodendron	Gen. et sp. nov	Valid	Prestianni et al.	Carboniferous (Mississippian)		Argentina	An isoetalean lycopsid. Genus includes new species P. minitensis.	
Selaginella alata	Sp. nov		Li & Wang in Li et al.	Cretaceous (Albian-Cenomanian)	Burmese amber	Myanmar	A species of Selaginella.	
Selaginella amplexicaulis	Sp. nov	valid	A.R.Schmidt & L.Regalado in Korall et al.	Cretaceous; Cenomanian	Burmese amber	Myanmar	A clubmoss of uncertain subgenus affiliation	Selaginella amplexicaulis
Selaginella aurita	Sp. nov	valid	A.R.Schmidt & L.Regalado in Korall et al.	Cretaceous; Cenomanian	Burmese amber	Myanmar	A clubmoss of uncertain subgenus affiliation	Selaginella aurita
Selaginella ciliifera	Sp. nov	valid	A.R.Schmidt & L.Regalado in Korall et al.	Cretaceous; Cenomanian	Burmese amber	Myanmar	A Selaginella subg. Stachygynandrum clubmoss	Selaginella ciliifera
Selaginella cretacea	Sp. nov	valid	Li et al.	Cretaceous	Burmese amber	Myanmar	A Selaginella subg. Stachygynandrum clubmoss	Selaginella cretacea
Selaginella grimaldii	Sp. nov	valid	A.R.Schmidt & L.Regalado in Korall et al.	Cretaceous; Cenomanian	Burmese amber	Myanmar	A Selaginella subg. Stachygynandrum clubmoss	Selaginella grimaldii
Selaginella heinrichsii	Sp. nov	valid	A.R.Schmidt & L.Regalado in Korall et al.	Cretaceous; Cenomanian	Burmese amber	Myanmar	A clubmoss of uncertain subgenus affiliation	Selaginella heinrichsii
Selaginella heterosporangiata	Sp. nov	valid	A.R.Schmidt & L.Regalado in Korall et al.	Cretaceous; Cenomanian	Burmese amber	Myanmar	A Selaginella subg. Stachygynandrum clubmoss	Selaginella heterosporangiata
Selaginella isophylla	Sp. nov	valid	A.R.Schmidt & L.Regalado in Korall et al.	Cretaceous; Cenomanian	Burmese amber	Myanmar	A Selaginella subg. Ericetorum clubmoss	Selaginella isophylla
Selaginella konijnenburgiae	Sp. nov	valid	A.R.Schmidt & L.Regalado in Korall et al.	Cretaceous; Cenomanian	Burmese amber	Myanmar	A clubmoss of uncertain subgenus affiliation	Selaginella konijnenburgiae
Selaginella longifimbriata	Sp. nov	valid	A.R.Schmidt & L.Regalado in Korall et al.	Cretaceous; Cenomanian	Burmese amber	Myanmar	A Selaginella subg. Stachygynandrum clubmoss	Selaginella longifimbriata
Selaginella minutissima	Sp. nov	valid	A.R.Schmidt & L.Regalado in Korall et al.	Cretaceous; Cenomanian	Burmese amber	Myanmar	A Selaginella subg. Stachygynandrum clubmoss	Selaginella minutissima
Selaginella obscura	Sp. nov	valid	A.R.Schmidt & L.Regalado in Korall et al.	Cretaceous; Cenomanian	Burmese amber	Myanmar	A clubmoss of uncertain subgenus affiliation	Selaginella obscura
Selaginella ohlhoffiorum	Sp. nov	valid	A.R.Schmidt & L.Regalado in Korall et al.	Cretaceous; Cenomanian	Burmese amber	Myanmar	A Selaginella subg. Stachygynandrum clubmoss	Selaginella ohlhoffiorum
Selaginella ovoidea	Sp. nov	valid	A.R.Schmidt & L.Regalado in Korall et al.	Cretaceous; Cenomanian	Burmese amber	Myanmar	A clubmoss of uncertain subgenus affiliation	Selaginella ovoidea
Selaginella patrickmuelleri	Sp. nov	valid	A.R.Schmidt & L.Regalado in Korall et al.	Cretaceous; Cenomanian	Burmese amber	Myanmar	A Selaginella subg. Stachygynandrum clubmoss	Selaginella patrickmuelleri
Selaginella pellucida	Sp. nov	valid	A.R.Schmidt & L.Regalado in Korall et al.	Cretaceous; Cenomanian	Burmese amber	Myanmar	A clubmoss of uncertain subgenus affiliation	Selaginella pellucida
Selaginella tomescui	Sp. nov	valid	A.R.Schmidt & L.Regalado in Korall et al.	Cretaceous; Cenomanian	Burmese amber	Myanmar	A clubmoss of uncertain subgenus affiliation	
Selaginella villosa	Sp. nov	valid	A.R.Schmidt & L.Regalado in Korall et al.	Cretaceous; Cenomanian	Burmese amber	Myanmar	A Selaginella subg. Stachygynandrum clubmoss	Selaginella villosa
Selaginella wangboi	Sp. nov	valid	A.R.Schmidt & L.Regalado in Korall et al.	Cretaceous; Cenomanian	Burmese amber	Myanmar	A clubmoss of uncertain subgenus affiliation	Selaginella wangboi
Selaginella wangxinii	Sp. nov	valid	A.R.Schmidt & L.Regalado in Korall et al.	Cretaceous; Cenomanian	Burmese amber	Myanmar	A Selaginella subg. Stachygynandrum clubmoss	Selaginella wangxinii
Selaginella wunderlichiana	Sp. nov	valid	A.R.Schmidt & L.Regalado in Korall et al.	Cretaceous; Cenomanian	Burmese amber	Myanmar	A Selaginella subg. Ericetorum clubmoss	Selaginella wunderlichiana

=== Lycopsid research ===
- Description of new fossil material of Guangdedendron micrum, providing new information on the morphology of this plant, is published by Gao et al. (2022).
- Xu, Liu & Wang (2022) describe new fossil material of Sublepidodendron grabaui from the Devonian (Famennian) Wutong Formation (China), providing new information on the morphology of the female reproductive organs of this plant.

== Marchantiophyta ==
Name	Novelty	Status	Authors	Age	Type locality	Location	Notes	Images
Radula patrickmuelleri	Sp. nov	Valid	Feldberg, Schäfer-Verwimp & Renner in Feldberg et al.	Cretaceous (Albian-Cenomanian)	Burmese amber	Myanmar	A liverwort, a species of Radula.	
Radula tanaiensis	Sp. nov	Valid	Feldberg, Schäfer-Verwimp & Renner in Feldberg et al.	Cretaceous (Albian-Cenomanian)	Burmese amber	Myanmar	A liverwort, a species of Radula.	
Ricciopsis asturicus	Sp. nov	Valid	Santos et al.	Late Jurassic (Kimmeridgian)	Lastres Formation	Spain	A liverwort belonging to the family Ricciaceae.	
Ricciopsis cortaderitaensis	Gen. et sp. nov	Valid	Savoretti et al.	Middle Triassic		Argentina	A liverwort.	
Ricciellites	Sp. nov	Valid	Savoretti et al.	Middle Triassic		Argentina	A liverwort. Genus includes new species R. unsaltoensis.	

=== Marchantiophyta research ===
- New specimens of Radula heinrichsii, providing new information on the morphology of this liverwort, are described from the Cretaceous Burmese amber by Wang et al. (2022).

== Ferns and fern allies ==
Name	Novelty	Status	Authors	Age	Type locality	Location	Notes	Images
Acrostichopteris alcainensis	Sp. nov	Valid	Skog & Sender	Early Cretaceous (Albian)	Escucha Formation	Spain	A member of the family Hymenophyllaceae.	
Coniopteris antarctica	Sp. nov	In press	Trevisan et al.	Late Cretaceous		Antarctica		
Diodonopteris virgulata	Sp. nov	In press	Zhou et al.	Early Permian		China	A botryopteid fern.	
Discosoropteris	Gen. et 2 sp. nov	In press	Pšenička et al.	Carboniferous (Pennsylvanian)	Kladno Formation	Czech Republic	A leptosporangiate fern. Genus includes new species D. chlupatum and D. zlatkokvacekii.	
Dryopterites beishanensis	Sp. nov	In press	Ren & Sun in Ren et al.	Early Cretaceous	Chijinbao Formation	China	A fern Announced online in 2022 officially published in 2023	
Gleichenia nagalingumiae	Sp. nov		Cantrill et al.	Miocene		Australia	A species of Gleichenia.	
Hymenophyllites angustus	Sp. nov		Li & Wang in Li et al.	Cretaceous (Albian-Cenomanian)	Burmese amber	Myanmar	A member of the family Hymenophyllaceae. Originally described as a species of Hymenophyllites, but subsequently moved to the genus Trichomanes sensu lato by Li et al. (2023).	
Hymenophyllites kachinensis	Sp. nov		Li & Wang in Li et al.	Cretaceous (Albian-Cenomanian)	Burmese amber	Myanmar	A member of the family Hymenophyllaceae.	
Hymenophyllites setosus	Sp. nov		Li & Wang in Li et al.	Cretaceous (Albian-Cenomanian)	Burmese amber	Myanmar	A member of the family Hymenophyllaceae.	
Microlepia burmasia	Sp. nov	Valid	Long, Wang & Shi in Long et al.	Cretaceous	Burmese amber	Myanmar	A fern of uncertain affinities. Originally described as a dennstaedtiaceous fern belonging to the genus Microlepia, but this classification was contested by Zhang (2024). Published online in 2022, but the issue date of the article naming it is listed as March 2023.	
Mikasapteris	Gen. et sp. nov	Valid	Nishida et al.	Late Cretaceous	Yezo Group	Japan	A probable stem polypod leptosporangiate fern. Genus includes new species M. rothwellii.	
Paralophosoria	Gen. et sp. nov	Valid	Morales-Toledo, Mendoza-Ruiz & Cevallos-Ferriz	Middle Jurassic	Otlaltepec Formation	Mexico	A member of the family Dicksoniaceae. Genus includes new species P. jurassica.	
Phyllotheca douroensis	Sp. nov		Barbosa et al.	Carboniferous (Gzhelian)	Douro Carboniferous Basin	Portugal	A member of Equisetales.	
Scolecopteris zhoui	Sp. nov	In press	Zhang et al.	Early Permian	Taiyuan Formation	China	A member of Marattiales belonging to the family Psaroniaceae.	
Wolfeniana	Nom. nov	Valid	Deshmukh	Devonian	Hampshire Group	United States (West Virginia)	A member of Stauropteridales; a replacement name for Gillespiea Erwin & Rothwell (1989).	

=== Fern and fern ally research ===
- Pecopteris lativenosa is interpreted as a member of the late Paleozoic marattialean family Psaroniaceae by Li et al. (2022).

== Gnetales ==
Name	Novelty	Status	Authors	Age	Type locality	Location	Notes	Images
Bassitheca	Gen. et sp. nov	Valid	Manchester et al.	Late Jurassic	Morrison Formation	United States (Utah)	A gnetale. Genus includes the species B. hoodiorum.	
Dichoephedra	Gen. et sp. nov	In press	Ren et al.	Early Cretaceous	Chijinbao Formation	China	A member of the family Ephedraceae. Genus includes new species D. beishanensis.	

== Bennettitales ==
Name	Novelty	Status	Authors	Age	Type locality	Location	Notes	Images
Dictyozamites barnardi	Sp. nov	Valid	Saadatnejad	Late Triassic (Rhaetian)	Kalariz Formation	Iran	A member of Bennettitales.	
Dictyozamites fakhri	Sp. nov	Valid	Saadatnejad	Late Triassic (Rhaetian)	Kalariz Formation	Iran	A member of Bennettitales.	
Kimuriella	Gen. et sp. nov	Valid	Pott & Takimoto	Late Jurassic (Oxfordian)	Tochikubo Formation	Japan	A member of Bennettitales. Genus includes new species K. densifolia.	
Zamites pateri	Sp. nov	Valid	Kvaček	Late Cretaceous (Cenomanian)	Peruc–Korycany Formation	Czech Republic		

== Ginkgophytes ==
Name	Novelty	Status	Authors	Age	Type locality	Location	Notes	Images
Glossophyllum lanceolatum	Sp. nov		Sun & Deng in Sun et al.	Late Triassic		China		
Glossophyllum panii	Sp. nov		Sun & Deng in Sun et al.	Late Triassic		China		
Pseudotorellia baganuriana	Sp. nov	In press	Nosova & Kostina	Early Cretaceous (Aptian–Albian)	Khuren Dukh Formation	Mongolia		
Pseudotorellia zhoui	Sp. nov	In press	Dong et al.	Middle-Late Jurassic	Daohugou Beds	China		
Umaltolepis zhoui	Sp. nov	In press	Dong et al.	Middle-Late Jurassic	Daohugou Beds	China		

=== Ginkgophyte research ===
- Revision of Ginkgo abaniensis, based on data from leaves from the Jurassic Mura Formation (Russia), is published by Frolov & Mashchuk (2022), who emend the diagnosis of this species, and transfer Ginkgo abaniensis, Ginkgo glinkiensis and Ginkgo capillata to the genus Ginkgoites.

== Conifers ==
=== Araucariaceae ===
Name	Novelty	Status	Authors	Age	Type locality	Location	Notes	Images
Agathoxylon argentinum	Sp. nov	Valid	Bodnar et al.	Late Triassic	Ischigualasto Formation	Argentina		

=== Cheirolepidiaceae ===
Name	Novelty	Status	Authors	Age	Type locality	Location	Notes	Images
Brachyoxylon yanqingense	Sp. nov		Cheng et al.	Late Jurassic	Tuchengzi Formation	China	A probable member of the family Cheirolepidiaceae.	
Frenelopsis antunesii	Sp. nov	In press	Mendes & Kvaček	Early Cretaceous (Aptian–Albian)	Figueira da Foz Formation	Portugal	A member of the family Cheirolepidiaceae.	
Pseudofrenelopsis zlatkoi	Sp. nov		Kvaček & Mendes	Early Cretaceous (Aptian-Albian)	Figueira da Foz Formation	Portugal		

=== Cupressaceae ===
Name	Novelty	Status	Authors	Age	Type locality	Location	Notes	Images
Cupressinanthus klebsii	Sp. nov	Valid	Sadowski, Schmidt & Kunzmann	Eocene		Europe (Baltic Sea region)	Cupressaceous pollen cone.	
Patagotaxodia	Gen. et sp. nov	Valid	Andruchow-Colombo et al.	Late Cretaceous (Maastrichtian)	Lefipán Formation	Argentina	A member of the family Cupressaceae. Genus includes new species P. lefipanensis.	

=== Pinaceae ===
Name	Novelty	Status	Authors	Age	Type locality	Location	Notes	Images
Keteleerioxylon changchunense	Sp. nov		Shi, Sun, Meng & Yu in Shi et al.	Early Cretaceous (Albian)	Yingcheng Formation	China	A Keteleeria-like wood morphogenus.	
Nothotsuga mulaensis	Sp. nov		Li & Dong in Dong et al.	Miocene	Changtai Formation	China	A species of Nothotsuga.	
Pinus prehwangshanensis	Sp. nov		Bazhenova, Wu & Jin in Bazhenova et al.	Late Pleistocene	Maoming Basin	China	A pine.	
Pinus shengxianica	Sp. nov		Li, Hu & Xiao in Li et al.	Miocene	Shengxian Formation	China	A pine.	

=== Podocarpaceae ===
Name	Novelty	Status	Authors	Age	Type locality	Location	Notes	Images
Phyllocladoxylon antarcticum	Sp. nov	Announced	Pujana et al.	Oligocene	San José Formation	Chile	A podocarpaceous wood morphospecies Announced in 2022; Officially published in 2023	
Podocarpoxylon resinosum	Sp. nov	Announced	Pujana et al.	Oligocene	San José Formation	Chile	A podocarpaceous wood morphospecies Announced in 2022; Officially published in 2023	
Podocarpus mexicanoxylon	Sp. nov		Castañeda-Posadas	Miocene		Mexico	A species of Podocarpus.	

=== Sciadopityaceae ===
Name	Novelty	Status	Authors	Age	Type locality	Location	Notes	Images
Zhangoxylon	Gen. et sp. nov	In press	Jiang et al.	Middle to Late Jurassic (Callovian to Kimmeridgian)		China	A member of the family Sciadopityaceae. Genus includes new species Z. yanliaoense.	

=== Voltziales ===
Name	Novelty	Status	Authors	Age	Type locality	Location	Notes	Images
Hexicladia	Gen. et sp. nov	Announced	Wang et al.	Permian (Cisuralian)	Shanxi Formation	China	A voltzialean conifer. The type species is H. yongchangensis. Announced in 2022; Officially published in 2023	

=== Other conifers ===
Name	Novelty	Status	Authors	Age	Type locality	Location	Notes	Images
Aciphyllum	Gen. et sp. nov		Barbacka & Górecki in Barbacka et al.	Early Jurassic (Hettangian)	Zagaje Formation	Poland	A needle leaf similar to the leaves of Pinus. Genus includes new species A. triangulatum.	
Ductoagathoxylon tsaaganensis	Sp. nov	In press	Cai, Zhang & Feng in Cai et al.	Late Permian		Mongolia		
Sidashia	Gen. et sp. nov	In press	Forte, Kustatscher & Van Konijnenburg-van Cittert in Forte et al.	Middle Triassic (Anisian)		Italy	Genus includes new species S. tridentata.	
Ullrichia	Gen. et comb. nov	Valid	Kerp et al.	Permian		Germany	The type species is "Lebachia" laxifolia (1939); genus also includes "L." intermedia (1939) and "L." mucronata (1939).	

=== Conifer research ===
- Bodnar et al. (2022) reassess the anatomy and systematics of the permineralized conifer-like woods from the Triassic strata from Argentina, confirm the assignment of the logs related to the families Cupressaceae and Cheirolepidiaceae, as well as three taxa related to Araucariaceae (Agathoxylon cozzoi, Agathoxylon protoaraucana and Agathoxylon argentinum), and argue that the fossil woods previously assigned to the families Podocarpaceae and Taxaceae do not have enough preserved characters to support such assignment.
- A study on the pattern of conifer turnover across the Cretaceous-Paleogene boundary in the Raton and Denver basins (Colorado, United States) is published by Berry (2022).
- Mantzouka, Akkemik & Güngör (2022) describe fossil woods of Cupressinoxylon matromnense from the middle Miocene Eşelek volcanic deposits (Gökçeada, Turkey), preserved with feeding damage produced by members of the agromyzid genus Protophytobia, and supporting the existence of an eastern Mediterranean Miocene Climatic Optimum hotspot which additionally included Greek islands of Lemnos and Lesbos.

== Flowering plants ==
=== Chloranthales ===
Name	Novelty	Status	Authors	Age	Type locality	Location	Notes	Images
Canrightia foveolata	Sp. nov	Valid	Friis et al.	Early Cretaceous (Aptian-Albian)	Almargem Formation	Portugal		
Proencistemon	Gen. et sp. nov	Valid	Friis et al.	Early Cretaceous (Aptian-Albian)	Almargem Formation	Portugal	Genus includes new species P. portugallicus.	

=== Magnoliids ===
==== Laurales ====
Name	Novelty	Status	Authors	Age	Type locality	Location	Notes	Images
Araliaephyllum silvapinedae	Sp. nov	In press	Rubalcava-Knoth & Cevallos-Ferriz	Cretaceous (Albian–Cenomanian)	La Cintura Formation	Mexico		
Argapaloxylon salvadorensis	Sp. nov	Valid	Vasquez-Loranca & Cevallos-Ferriz	Miocene		El Salvador	A member of the family Lauraceae.	
Catula	Gen. et sp. nov	Valid	Maccracken et al.	Late Cretaceous (Campanian)	Kaiparowits Formation	United States (Utah)	A member of the family Lauraceae. Genus includes new species C. gettyi.	
Cryptocaryoxylon irregularis	Sp. nov	Valid	Akkemik, Iamandei & Çelik	Early Miocene	Hançili Formation	Turkey	Fossil wood of a member of the family Lauraceae.	
Laurinoxylon scalariforme	Sp. nov	Valid	Vasquez-Loranca & Cevallos-Ferriz	Miocene		El Salvador	A member of the family Lauraceae.	
Mezilaurinoxylon americana	Sp. nov	Valid	Vasquez-Loranca & Cevallos-Ferriz	Miocene		El Salvador	A member of the family Lauraceae.	
Mezilaurinoxylon draconis	Sp. nov	Valid	Vasquez-Loranca & Cevallos-Ferriz	Miocene		El Salvador	A member of the family Lauraceae.	
Mezilaurinoxylon miocenica	Sp. nov	Valid	Vasquez-Loranca & Cevallos-Ferriz	Miocene		El Salvador	A member of the family Lauraceae.	

==== Magnoliales ====
Name	Novelty	Status	Authors	Age	Type locality	Location	Notes	Images
Fissistigma himachalensis	Sp. nov	Valid	Singh et al.	Miocene		India	A species of Fissistigma.	
Magnolia allasoniae	Sp. nov	Valid	Martinetto in Niccolini et al.	Miocene (Messinian)	Piedmont Basin	Italy	A species of Magnolia. First named in 1995 but did not meet ICBN requirements; subsequently validated in 2022.	

==== Piperales ====
Name	Novelty	Status	Authors	Age	Type locality	Location	Notes	Images
Aristospermum	Gen. et sp. nov	Valid	Friis, Crane & Pedersen	Early Cretaceous (Aptian–Albian)		Portugal; United States (Virginia)	A member of the family Aristolochiaceae. Genus includes new species A. huberi.	
Siratospermum	Gen. et sp. nov	Valid	Friis, Crane & Pedersen	Late Cretaceous (Cenomanian)		United States (Maryland)	A member of the family Aristolochiaceae. Genus includes new species S. mauldinense.	

=== Monocots ===
==== Lilioid monocots ====
Name	Novelty	Status	Authors	Age	Type locality	Location	Notes	Images
Pandanus estellae	Sp. nov	Valid	Rozefelds et al.	Oligocene		Australia	A species of Pandanus.	

==== Commelinid monocots ====
Name	Novelty	Status	Authors	Age	Type locality	Location	Notes	Images
Sabalites ghughuaensis	Sp. nov	In press	Kumar, Hazra & Khan in Kumar et al.	Late Cretaceous-Paleocene (Maastrichtian-Danian)	Deccan Intertrappean Beds	India	A member of the family Arecaceae belonging to the subfamily Coryphoideae.	
Sabalites umariaensis	Sp. nov	In press	Kumar, Hazra & Khan in Kumar et al.	Late Cretaceous-Paleocene (Maastrichtian-Danian)	Deccan Intertrappean Beds	India	A member of the family Arecaceae belonging to the subfamily Coryphoideae.	

==== Monocot research ====
- Leaf fossils of costapalmate-palms belonging to the genus Sabalites are described from the ?Santonian–Campanian Belly River Group, Campanian Foremost Formation (Alberta, Canada) and Maastrichtian Frenchman Formation (Saskatchewan, Canada) by Greenwood, Conran & West (2022), who interpret the studied fossils as constraining climate reconstructions for the Late Cretaceous high mid-latitudes of North America (c. 55° N) to exclude significant freezing episodes; the authors also transfer the Late Cretaceous species "Geonomites" imperialis to the genus Phoenicites, and reassess Sabalites carolinensis as more likely to be Campanian than Coniacian–Santonian in age.
- A study on the impact of the absence of megaherbivores in the aftermath of the Cretaceous–Paleogene extinction event on the evolution of palms is published by Onstein, Kissling & Linder (2022).
- A study on the evolutionary history of palms belonging to the group Mauritiinae, as inferred from a phylogenetic analysis incorporating fossil data, is published by Bacon et al. (2022).

=== Basal eudicots ===
==== Proteales ====
Name	Novelty	Status	Authors	Age	Type locality	Location	Notes	Images
Distefananthus	Gen. et sp. nov		Huegele & Wang	Early Cretaceous (Albian)	Dakota Formation	United States (Kansas)	A platanaceous inflorescence. Genus includes new species D. hoisingtonensis.	
Langeranthus	Gen et sp nov	Valid	Huegele & Manchester	Eocene; Ypresian	Klondike Mountain Formation	United States (Washington)	A platanaceous flowering head. The type species is L. dillhoffiorum	
Meliosma eosinica	Sp. nov		Moiseeva, Kodrul & Jin in Moiseeva et al.	Late Eocene	Huangniuling Formation	China	A species of Meliosma.	
Nelumbo delinghaensis	Sp. nov		Luo & Jia in Luo et al.	Miocene	Upper Youshashan Formation	China	A species of Nelumbo.	
Nelumbo fujianensis	Sp. nov	In press	Dong et al.	Miocene	Fotan Group	China	A species of Nelumbo.	
Platimeliphyllum durhamensis	Comb nov	valid	(Wolfe)	Late Eocene	Puget Group "Upper Fultonian" Loc 9832	United States (Washington)	A platanaceous leaf. Moved from "Fothergilla" durhamensis (1968).	
Platimeliphyllum fushunensis	Comb nov	valid	(Chen)	Eocene	Fushun Formation	China	A platanaceous leaf. Moved from "Betula" fushunensis.	
Sapindopsis chinensis	Sp. nov		Golovneva et al.	Early Cretaceous (Albian)	Dalazi Formation	China	A member of the family Platanaceae.	
Sapindopsis orientalis	Sp. nov		Golovneva et al.	Early Cretaceous (Albian)	Frentsevka Formation	Russia (Primorsky Krai)	A member of the family Platanaceae.	

===== Protealean research =====
- Redescription of the Okanagan Highlands genus Langeria with description of associated stipules and reproductive structures plus formal reassignment of the genus to Platanaceae by Huegele & Manchester is published.

==== Ranunculales ====
Name	Novelty	Status	Authors	Age	Type locality	Location	Notes	Images
Berberis auriolensis	Sp. nov	Valid	Denk & Sami in Denk et al.	Pleistocene (Calabrian)		Italy	A species of Berberis.	
Berberis siwalica	Sp. nov	Valid	Singh et al.	Miocene		India	A species of Berberis.	
Mahonia mangbangensis	Sp. nov		Tang et al.	Pliocene	Mangbang Formation	China	A species of Mahonia.	
Palaeosinomenium hengduanensis	Sp. nov		Wu & Zhou in Wu et al.	Eocene	Shuanghe Formation	China	A member of the family Menispermaceae.	

=== Superasterids ===
==== Aquifoliales ====
Name	Novelty	Status	Authors	Age	Type locality	Location	Notes	Images
Ilex antiquorum	Nom. nov	Valid	Doweld	Late Cretaceous (Maastrichtian)		Germany	A holly; a replacement name for Ilex antiqua Knobloch & Mai (1986).	
Ilex myricina	Nom. nov	Valid	Doweld	Miocene (Messinian)		Italy	A holly; a replacement name for Ilex myricoides Massalongo (1858).	

==== Caryophyllales ====
Name	Novelty	Status	Authors	Age	Type locality	Location	Notes	Images
Podopterus mijangosae	Sp. nov	In press	Estrada-Ruiz	Miocene	Mexican amber	Mexico	A species of Podopterus.	

==== Cornales ====
Name	Novelty	Status	Authors	Age	Type locality	Location	Notes	Images
Blackwelloxylon	Nom. nov	Valid	Deshmukh	Pleistocene		United States (Mississippi)	A member of the family Cornaceae; a replacement name for Cornoxylon Blackwell (1982).	
Exbeckettia	Gen. et comb. nov	Valid	Manchester & Collinson	Early Eocene	London Clay	United Kingdom	A mastixioid fruit; a new genus for Beckettia mastixioides Reid & Chandler (1933).	

==== Dipsacales ====
Name	Novelty	Status	Authors	Age	Type locality	Location	Notes	Images
Sambucus heqingensis	Sp. nov	In press	Huang & Zhou in Huang et al.	Late Pliocene	Heqing Basin	China	A species of Sambucus.	

==== Ericales ====
Name	Novelty	Status	Authors	Age	Type locality	Location	Notes	Images
Paradiospyroxylon	Gen. et sp. nov	In press	Koutecký & Sakala in Koutecký, Sakala & Chytrý	Oligocene	Ústí Formation	Czech Republic	A member of the family Ebenaceae. Genus includes new species P. kvacekii.	

==== Icacinales ====
Name	Novelty	Status	Authors	Age	Type locality	Location	Notes	Images
Palaeophytocrene chicoensis	Sp. nov		Atkinson	Late Cretaceous (Campanian)	Chico Formation	United States (California)	A member of the family Icacinaceae.	

==== Metteniusales ====
Name	Novelty	Status	Authors	Age	Type locality	Location	Notes	Images
Calatola verae	Sp. nov		Estrada-Ruiz et al.	Miocene	Mexican amber	Mexico	A species of Calatola.	

=== Superrosids ===
==== Cucurbitales ====
Name	Novelty	Status	Authors	Age	Type locality	Location	Notes	Images
Libasperma	Gen. et sp. nov	In press	Huegele & Manchester	Paleocene	Fort Union Formation	United States (Montana)	A member of the family Cucurbitaceae. Genus includes new species L. potamoglossensis.	

==== Fabales ====
Name	Novelty	Status	Authors	Age	Type locality	Location	Notes	Images
Albizia yenbaiensis	Sp. nov	Announced	Nguyen, Su & J. Huang in Nguyen et al.	Miocene	Yen Bai Basin	Vietnam	An Albizia species. Announced in 2022; Officially published January 2023	
Anadenantheroxylon kurupaum	Sp. nov	Valid	Ramos et al.	Late Pleistocene	El Palmar Formation	Argentina	A member of the family Fabaceae.	
Cedrelinga paleocatenaeformis	Sp. nov	Valid	Ramos et al.	Late Pleistocene	El Palmar Formation	Argentina	A species of Cedrelinga.	
Cercioxylon mediterraneum	Sp. nov	Valid	Akkemik, Iamandei & Çelik	Early Miocene	Hançili Formation	Turkey	Fossil wood of a member of the family Fabaceae.	
Chloroleucoxylon	Gen. et sp. nov	Valid	Ramos et al.	Late Pleistocene	El Palmar Formation	Argentina	A member of the family Fabaceae. Genus includes new species C. yukeriense.	
Enterolobiumoxylon vassalloae	Sp. nov	Valid	Ramos et al.	Late Pleistocene	El Palmar Formation	Argentina	A member of the family Fabaceae.	
Leguminocarpum meghalayensis	Sp. nov	Announced	Bhatia, Srivastava & Mehrotra	Late Paleocene	Tura Formation	India	A fabaceous seed pod morphospecies. Announced in 2022; Officially published in 2023	
Microlobiusxylon parafoetidus	Sp. nov	Valid	Ramos et al.	Late Pleistocene	El Palmar Formation	Argentina	A member of the family Fabaceae.	
Paleobowdichia	Gen. et comb. nov	Valid	Herendeen et al.	Latest Paleocene to late early Eocene	Lamar River Formation	United States (Colorado; Wyoming)	A member of Papilionoideae; a new genus for "Acacia" lamarensis Knowlton (1899).	
Parapiptadenioxylon	Gen. et sp. nov	Valid	Ramos et al.	Late Pleistocene	El Palmar Formation	Argentina	A Fabaceae genus. The type species is P. pararigida.	
Parvileguminophyllum damalgiriensis	Sp. nov	Announced	Bhatia, Srivastava & Mehrotra	Late Paleocene	Tura Formation	India	A fabaceous leaf morphospecies. Announced in 2022; Officially published in 2023	
Podocarpium tibeticum	Sp. nov	In press	Li, Huang & Su in Li et al.	Late Eocene	Lunpola Basin	China	A member of the family Fabaceae.	
Pseudopiptadenioxylon	Gen. et sp. nov	Valid	Ramos et al.	Late Pleistocene	El Palmar Formation	Argentina	A member of the family Fabaceae. Genus includes new species P. uniseriatum.	
Tobya	Gen. et comb. nov	Valid	Herendeen et al.	Eocene	Cockfield Formation	United States (Kentucky; Tennessee)	A member of Papilionoideae; a new genus for "Diplotropis" claibornensis Herendeen & Dilcher (1990).	

===== Fabalean research =====
- New fossil material of members of the genus Bauhinia is described from the Eocene of the Puyang Basin (China) by Jia et al. (2022), who interpret their findings as the earliest reliable fossil records of Bauhinia in Asia.
- Moya et al. (2022) study the affinities of fossil legumes Entrerrioxylon victoriensis, Gossweilerodendroxylon palmariensis, Paraoxystigma concordiensis and Cylicodiscuxylon paragabunensis from the Cenozoic Paraná, Arroyo Feliciano and El Palmar formations (Argentina) with extant West African legumes, and discuss the possible migration routes by which these plants may have arrived in South America from Africa.

==== Fagales ====
Name	Novelty	Status	Authors	Age	Type locality	Location	Notes	Images
Castanopsis zhoui	Sp. nov	In press	Wang et al.	Miocene	Fotan Group	China	A species of Castanopsis.	
Comptonia hirsuta	Sp. nov		Xiao & Ji in Ji et al.	Miocene	Hannuoba Formation	China	A species of Comptonia.	
Myricoxylon doganyurtensis	Sp. nov	Valid	Akkemik, Iamandei & Çelik	Early Miocene		Turkey	Fossil wood of a member of the family Myricaceae.	
Nothofagoxylon ruei	Sp. nov	Announced	Pujana et al.	Oligocene	San José Formation	Chile	A nothofagaceous wood morphospecies Announced in 2022; Officially published in 2023	
Pterocarya magnifructa	Sp. nov	Valid	Stults, Tiffney & Axsmith	Pliocene		United States (Alabama)	A species of Pterocarya.	
Quercus nanningensis	Sp. nov	In press	Liu & Jin in Liu et al.	Late Oligocene	Yongning Formation	China	An oak.	
Quercus paleodisciformis	Sp. nov	In press	Liu & Jin in Liu et al.	Late Oligocene	Yongning Formation	China	An oak.	
Quercus paleohui	Sp. nov	In press	Liu & Jin in Liu et al.	Late Oligocene	Yongning Formation	China	An oak.	
Quercus yongningensis	Sp. nov	In press	Liu & Jin in Liu et al.	Late Oligocene	Yongning Formation	China	An oak.	

==== Malpighiales ====
Name	Novelty	Status	Authors	Age	Type locality	Location	Notes	Images
Belenocarpa	Gen. et comb. nov	Valid	Hamersma et al.	Early Oligocene		Peru	A member of the family Euphorbiaceae; a new genus for "Jatropha" tertiara Berry.	
Elatine odgaardii	Sp. nov	Valid	Bennike in Bennike et al.	Probably early Pleistocene		Greenland	A species of Elatine. Announced in 2022; the final article version was published in 2023.	
Mammeoxylon beylikduezuense	Sp. nov	In press	Akkemik et al.	Late Oligocene-Early Miocene	İstanbul Formation	Turkey	A Mammea relative wood morphospecies	
Mammeoxylon paramericana	Comb. nov	In press	(Nelson & Jud) Akkemik & D. Mantzouka	Miocene		Panama	A Mammea relative wood morphospecies Moved from Mammea paramericana (2017)	
Parinari hilliana	Sp. nov	Valid	Grote in Grote, Duangkrayom & Jintasakul	Late Miocene	Tha Chang beds	Thailand	A species of Parinari.	
Parinari khoratensis	Sp. nov	Valid	Grote in Grote, Duangkrayom & Jintasakul	Late Miocene	Tha Chang beds	Thailand	A species of Parinari.	
Plukenetia minima	Sp. nov	In press	Poinar	Miocene	Dominican amber	Dominican Republic	A species of Plukenetia.	

==== Malvales ====
Name	Novelty	Status	Authors	Age	Type locality	Location	Notes	Images
Malvacipolloides deccanensis	Sp. nov		Manchester et al.	Late Cretaceous-Paleocene (Maastrichtian–Danian)	Deccan Intertrappean Beds	India	A member of the family Malvaceae.	
Malvacipolloides intertrappea	Sp. nov		Manchester et al.	Late Cretaceous-Paleocene (Maastrichtian–Danian)	Deccan Intertrappean Beds	India	A member of the family Malvaceae.	
Thespesia neopopulnea	Sp. nov	Valid	Hazra, Mahato & Khan in Hazra et al.	Pliocene	Rajdanda Formation	India	A species of Thespesia.	

===== Malvalean research =====
- A study on the evolutionary history of Dipterocarpaceae, as indicated by biogeography of pollen fossils from Africa and India, molecular data and fossil amber records, is published by Bansal et al. (2022).

==== Myrtales ====
Name	Novelty	Status	Authors	Age	Type locality	Location	Notes	Images
Hemitrapa zhangpuensis	Sp. nov		Dong et al.	Miocene		China	A member of the family Lythraceae belonging to the subfamily Trapoideae.	
Lagerstroemioxylon compactum	Sp. nov	Valid	Harsh & Shekhawat	Eocene		India	A member of the family Lythraceae.	
Lagerstroemioxylon delicatum	Sp. nov	Valid	Harsh & Shekhawat	Eocene		India	A member of the family Lythraceae.	
Myrtineoxylon hoffmannae	Sp. nov	Announced	Pujana et al.	Oligocene	San José Formation	Chile	A myrtaceous wood morphospecies. Announced in 2022; Officially published in 2023	
Trapa natanifolia	Sp. nov		Han & Jia in Han et al.	Late Eocene	Bailuyuan Formation	China	A water caltrop.	
Trapa qaidamensis	Sp. nov		Cai et al.	Miocene	Shangyoushashan Formation	China	A water caltrop.	

==== Oxalidales ====
Name	Novelty	Status	Authors	Age	Type locality	Location	Notes	Images
Ceratopetalum suciensis	Sp nov	In press	Tang, Smith, & Atkinson	Late Cretaceous; Campanian	Cedar District Formation	United States (Washington)	A Cunoniaceous species.	
Connaroxylon	Gen. et sp. nov	Valid	Baas et al.	Cretaceous; Maastrichtian-earliest Paleocene	Deccan Intertrappean Beds	India	A probable Connaraceous wood morphotaxon. The type species is C. dimorphum. First named in 2017 but failed ICBN requirements; subsequently validated in 2022.	
Cunoniocarpa	Gen. et sp. nov	Valid	Matel et al.	Early Eocene	Huitrera Formation	Argentina	A member of Cunoniaceae. The type species is C. stylosa.	
Racemofructus	Gen. et sp. nov	Valid	Matel et al.	Early Eocene	Huitrera Formation	Argentina	A member of Cunoniaceae. The type species is R. fasciculatus.	
Weinmannioxylon trichospermoides	Sp. nov	Announced	Pujana et al.	Oligocene	San José Formation	Chile	A cunoniaceous wood morphospecies. Announced in 2022; Officially published in 2023	

===== Oxalidalean research =====
Tand, Smith, and Atkinson describe the first North American instance of the previously Paleo-Antarctic Rainforest Lineage Cunoniaceae fruits from Sucia Island. Previously considered solely a Gondwanan family, the new species indicate a complex geographic history for the group.

==== Rosales ====
Name	Novelty	Status	Authors	Age	Type locality	Location	Notes	Images
Eophylica	Gen. et sp. nov	Valid	Shi et al.	Cretaceous	Burmese amber	Myanmar	A rhamnaceous floral morphotaxon. The type species is E. priscastellata.	
Ficoxylon fusiforme	Sp. nov	Valid	El-Noamani	Late Cretaceous	Taref Formation	Egypt	A member of the family Moraceae.	
Ficus fujianensis	Sp. nov	In press	Dong et al.	Miocene		China	A species of Ficus.	
Ficus zhangpuensis	Sp. nov	In press	Dong et al.	Miocene		China	A species of Ficus.	
Ventilago pliocenica	Sp. nov		Hazra et al.	Pliocene		India	A species of Ventilago.	
Ventilago siwalika	Sp. nov		Hazra et al.	Miocene		India	A species of Ventilago.	

==== Sapindales ====
Name	Novelty	Status	Authors	Age	Type locality	Location	Notes	Images
Barkleya	Gen. et comb. nov	Valid	Manchester & Judd	Eocene; Ypresian	Green River Formation	United States (Colorado)	An anacardiaceous samara. The type species is B. schinoloxa. Moved from Anacardites schinoloxus (1929). Possibly the fruits of "Rhus" nigricans.	
Canarium haominiae	Sp. nov	In press	Yin et al.	Miocene		China	A species of Canarium.	
Canarium maomingense	Sp. nov		Xiang & Jin in Xiang et al.	Late Pleistocene	Maoming Basin	China	A species of Canarium.	
Choerospondias mioaxillaris	Sp. nov		Xiao & Wu in Xiao et al.	Miocene	Shengxian Formation	China	A species of Choerospondias.	
Choerospondias tiantaiensis	Sp. nov		Xiao & Wu in Xiao et al.	Miocene	Shengxian Formation	China	A species of Choerospondias.	
Grimmipollis	Gen. et sp. nov		Huang, Morley & Hoorn in Huang et al.	Eocene	Yaw Formation	Myanmar	A member of the family Sapindaceae. Genus includes new species G. burmanica.	
Koelreuteria kvacekii	Sp. nov	Valid	Chen, Del Rio & Su in Chen et al.	Eocene	Niubao Formation	China	A species of Koelreuteria.	
Loxopteroides	Gen. et sp. nov	In press	Manchester & Judd	Eocene	Ione Formation	United States (California; Oregon)	A member of the family Anacardiaceae. Genus includes new species L. weeksae.	
Vaudoisia	Gen. et comb. nov	Valid	Strullu-Derrien et al.	Eocene		France	A fruit of likely sapindalean affinity; a new genus for "Juglandicarya" gruetii Vaudois-Miéja (1976).	

==== Other Eudicots ====
Name	Novelty	Status	Authors	Age	Type locality	Location	Notes	Images
Zlatkovia	Gen. et sp. nov	In press	Rothwell & Stockey	Late Cretaceous	St. Mary River Formation	Canada (Alberta)	An aquatic eudicot. The type species is Z. crenulata.	

=== Other angiosperms ===
Name	Novelty	Status	Authors	Age	Type locality	Location	Notes	Images
Archaebuda	Gen. et sp. nov		Chen & Wang	Early Cretaceous (Barremian-Aptian)	Yixian Formation	China	A flower bud of an early angiosperm. Genus includes new species A. lingyuanensis.	
Ascarinophyllum	Gen. et sp. nov	Announced 2022	Čepičková & Kvaček	Late Cretaceous (Cenomanian)	Peruc–Korycany Formation	Czech Republic	A Basal angiosperm leaf morphogenus Similar to Mesodescolea plicata and Chloranthaceae. The type species is A. pecinovense. Officially published in 2023	
Covidifructus	Gen. et sp. nov	Valid	Heřmanová et al.	Late Cretaceous (late Turonian-Santonian)	Klikov Formation	Czech Republic	An angiosperm fruit of uncertain affinities, with similarities to the family Dilleniaceae. The type species is C. multicarpellatus.	
Elasmostemon	Gen. et sp. nov	Valid	Friis et al.	Early Cretaceous (Aptian-Albian)	Almargem Formation	Portugal	A flowering plant of uncertain position at the level of ANA-grade angiosperms-Chloranthaceae-magnoliids. Genus includes new species E. paisii.	
Endressistemon	Gen. et sp. nov	Valid	Friis et al.	Early Cretaceous (Aptian-Albian)	Almargem Formation	Portugal	A flowering plant of uncertain position at the level of ANA-grade angiosperms-Chloranthaceae-magnoliids. Genus includes new species E. cateficensis.	
Fairlingtonia microgyna	Sp. nov		Du et al.	Early Cretaceous	Zhonggou Formation	China	A herbaceous eudicot.	
Florigerminis	Gen. et sp. nov	In press	Cui et al.	Middle-Late Jurassic	Jiulongshan Formation	China	A possible flower bud. The type species is F. jurassica. First announced online 2021, Final article published in 2022.	Florigerminis jurassica
Gansupeltata	Gen. et sp. nov	Valid	Wu et al.	Early Cretaceous (Aptian)	Chijinpu Formation	China	An early flowering plant. Genus includes new species G. beishanensis.	
Herbifolia	Gen. et sp. nov	In press	Frolov & Enushchenko	Middle Jurassic (Aalenian)	Irkutsk Coal Basin	Russia	An angiosperm with leaf epidermal structure most similar to those of modern Asparagales and Liliales. Genus includes new species H. antiqua.	
Honeytheca	Gen. et sp. nov	In press	Huegele & Manchester	Paleocene	Fort Union Formation	United States (Montana)	A flowering plant of uncertain affinities. Genus includes new species H. bighornensis.	
Ibericarpus	Gen. et sp. nov	Valid	Friis et al.	Early Cretaceous (Aptian-Albian)	Almargem Formation	Portugal	A flowering plant of uncertain position at the level of ANA-grade angiosperms-Chloranthaceae-magnoliids. Genus includes new species I. cuneiformis.	
Lingyuananthus	Gen. et sp. nov		Wang	Early Cretaceous (Barremian–Aptian)	Yixian Formation	China	An early angiosperm. Genus includes new species L. inexpectus.	
Phylica piloburmensis	Sp. nov	Valid	Shi et al.	Cretaceous	Burmese amber	Myanmar	A flowering plant of uncertain affinities. Originally described as a species of Phylica. Oskolski et al. (2024) interpreted it as a flowering plant with an affinity to Rhamnaceae, possibly to an extinct basal lineage; on the other hand Beurel et al. (2024) interpreted it as more likely to have lauralean affinities, and made it the type species of the separate genus Nothophylica.	
Santaniella	Gen. et 2 sp. nov		Gobo et al.	Early Cretaceous (Barremian-Aptian)	Crato Formation	Brazil	Originally described as a member or a relative of the family Ranunculaceae, but subsequently considered to be a mesangiosperm of uncertain affinities, possibly a magnoliid. Genus includes new species S. lobata and S. acuta.	
Todziaphyllum saportanum	Comb. nov	Announced	(Velenovský) Čepičková & Kvaček	Late Cretaceous (Cenomanian)	Peruc–Korycany Formation	Czech Republic	A Basal angiosperm leaf morphogenus A new combination for Banksites saportanus Officially published in 2023	
Tolmania	Gen. et sp. nov	Valid	Edmonds, Stockey & Rothwell	Late Cretaceous (Maastrichtian)	St. Mary River Formation	Canada (Alberta)	An aquatic dicot. Genus includes new species T. aquatica.	
Valvidistemon	Gen. et sp. nov	Valid	Friis et al.	Early Cretaceous (Aptian-Albian)	Almargem Formation	Portugal	A flowering plant of uncertain position at the level of ANA-grade angiosperms-Chloranthaceae-magnoliids. Genus includes new species V. globiferus.	

=== General angiosperm research ===
- Surangea mohgaoensis, originally interpreted as fern megaspores, is reinterpreted as angiosperm fruits by Ramteke et al. (2022).
- Zhang et al. (2022) describe rich assemblages of spiny plant fossils from the Eocene (Bartonian) Niubao Formation (Tibet, China), preserving seven different spine morphologies, and interpret this finding as evidence of the presence of a diversity of spiny plants in Eocene central Tibet, as well as evidence of a rapid diversification of spiny plants in Eurasia around that time.
- A preliminary report on a new fossil angiosperm flora of the Lesvos Petrified Forest at Akrocheiras east of Sigri on Lesbos, Greece is given by Kafetzidou et al. Preliminary taxa identifications are given and commentary on the climactic implications are made.
- A study aiming to determine the relationship between past atmospheric CO_{2} and temperature fluctuations and the shifts in diversification rates of Poaceae and Asteraceae is published by Palazzesi et al. (2022).

== Other plants ==
Name	Novelty	Status	Authors	Age	Type locality	Location	Notes	Images
Aegianthus irkutensis	Sp. nov	In press	Nosova & Tekleva	Middle Jurassic	Prisayan Formation	Russia	Pollen cone with pollen of ginkgoalean or gnetophytalean affinity.	
Aysenoxylon	Gen et sp nov	Announced	Pujana et al.	Oligocene	San José Formation	Chile	A wood morphospecies of uncertain affinity. The type species is A. patorarensis. Announced in 2022; Officially published in 2023	
Bryokhutuliinia ignatovii	Sp. nov	Valid	Frolov, Kazanovsky & Enushchenko	Early Jurassic (Toarcian)	Middle Subformation of Prisayan Formation	Russia (Irkutsk Oblast)	A member of Bryopsida of uncertain affinities.	
Combina	Gen. et sp. nov		Santos & Wang	Middle Triassic (Anisian)	Calcena Formation	Spain	A cone-like reproductive organ of a seed plant. Genus includes new species C. triassica.	
Dioonitocarpidium rossicum	Sp. nov	Valid	Gomankov	Permian		Russia	A member of Cycadales.	
Europoxylon garapensis	Sp. nov	In press	Conceição et al.	Permian (Cisuralian)	Pedra de Fogo Formation	Brazil	A gymnosperm.	
Jarudia	Gen. et sp. nov		Shi et al.	Early Cretaceous	Huolinhe Formation	China	A seed-bearing structure of a corystosperm seed fern. Genus includes new species J. zhoui.	
Komlopteris distinctiva	Sp. nov		Barbacka in Barbacka et al.	Early Jurassic (Hettangian)	Zagaje Formation	Poland	Cuticle of a seed fern.	
Lesleya ceriacoi	Sp. nov	In press	Correia et al.	Carboniferous (Gzhelian)	Douro Carboniferous Basin	Portugal	An early gymnosperm.	
Palaeodichelyma kiritchkovae	Sp. nov	Valid	Frolov, Kazanovsky & Enushchenko	Early Jurassic (Pliensbachian)	Lower Subformation of Prisayan Formation	Russia (Irkutsk Oblast)	A member of Bryopsida of uncertain affinities.	
Paragigantopteris	Gen. et sp. nov	In press	Ma et al.	Permian (Wuchiapingian)	Lungtan Formation	China	A gigantopterid. Genus includes new species P. qingloongensis.	
Pauthecophyton hezhangensis	Sp. nov		Wang et al.	Devonian (Pragian-Emsian)	Danlin Formation	China	A euphyllophyte of uncertain affinities.	
Piterophyton	Gen. et sp. nov	Valid	Naugolnykh	Ordovician		Russia (Leningrad Oblast)	A rhyniophyte of uncertain affinities. The type species is P. caudatum.	
Polycanaloxylon	Gen. et sp. nov	In press	Conceição et al.	Permian (Cisuralian)	Pedra de Fogo Formation	Brazil	A gymnosperm. Genus includes new species P. merlottii.	
Psilophyton diakanthon	Sp. nov		Colston, Landaw & Tomescu	Devonian (Emsian)	Battery Point Formation	Canada (Quebec)	A member of the group Trimerophytopsida.	
Renbernia	Gen. et sp. nov	In press	Friis, Crane & Pedersen	Early Cretaceous (Albian)	Potomac Group	United States (Virginia)	A seed plant similar to Brenneria potomacensis. Genus includes new species R. zhoui.	
Rhyniotaenium	Gen. et sp. nov	In press	Krings	Early Devonian	Rhynie chert	United Kingdom	An alga, probably a green alga belonging to the family Mesotaeniaceae. Genus includes new species R. velatum.	
Sinoglossa	Gen. et sp. nov	Valid	Zhang et al.	Middle Triassic	Linjia Formation	China	A member of Glossopteridales. The type species is S. sunii.	
Taimyria	Gen. et sp. nov	Valid	Naugolnykh & Mogutcheva	Early Triassic (Induan)	Keshinskian/Keshinskaya Formation	Russia (Krasnoyarsk Krai)	A member of Peltaspermales belonging to the family Angaropeltaceae. Genus includes new species T. triassica.	
Taungurungia	Gen. et sp. nov	Valid	McSweeney, Shimeta & Buckeridge	Devonian (Pragian–Emsian)	Norton Gully Sandstone Formation	Australia	A plant of uncertain affinities, similar to members of Zosterophyllopsida. Genus includes new species T. garrattii.	
Teyoua	Gen. et sp. nov	In press	Huang, Liu & Xue	Devonian (probably Pragian)	Mangshan Group	China	A polysporangiate land plant. Genus includes new species T. antrorsa.	
Traskia	Gen. et sp. nov	Valid	Rothwell et al.	Jurassic		Canada (British Columbia)	A stem-cycad. Genus includes new species T. maahlae.	
Vetiplanaxis obtusus	Sp. nov	In press	Li et al.	Cretaceous	Burmese amber	Myanmar	A moss belonging to the group Hypnodendrales.	
Wilhowia	Gen. et sp. nov	Valid	Gensel	Devonian (Emsian)	Battery Point Formation	Canada (Quebec)	A basal euphyllophyte. Genus includes new species W. phocarum.	
Xadzigacalix	Gen. et sp. nov	Valid	Klymiuk, Rothwell & Stockey	Early Cretaceous (Valanginian)		Canada (British Columbia)	A gymnosperm of uncertain phylogenetic placement, possibly having affinities with gnetophytes or angiosperms. Genus includes new species X. quatsinoensis.	
Xinhangia	Gen. et sp. nov		Yang & Wang	Devonian (Famennian)	Wutong Formation	China	A fern-like plant of uncertain affinities. Genus includes new species X. spina.	

=== Other plant research ===
- A study on the xylem development in Leptocentroxyla, and on its implications for the knowledge of the evolution of pith, is published by Tomescu & McQueen (2022).
- Decombeix et al. (2022) report evidence of tylosis formation in permineralized wood of Dameria hueberi from the Tournaisian of Australia.
- The first comprehensive crown reconstruction of Medullosa stellata var. typica, based on data from a specimen from the Chemnitz petrified forest (Germany), is presented by Luthardt et al. (2022).
- Fossil material of Rhabdotaenia is reported from the Permian Umm Irna Formation (Jordan) by Blomenkemper et al. (2022), representing the northernmost occurrence of this Gondwanan leaf type reported to date.

== Palynology ==
Name	Novelty	Status	Authors	Age	Type locality	Location	Notes	Images
Anapiculatisporites radiatus	Sp. nov	Valid	Playford	Carboniferous (Mississippian)	Lyall Formation	Australia	A trilete spore.	
Apricasporites	Gen. et sp. nov	Valid	Playford	Carboniferous (Mississippian)	Lyall Formation	Australia	A trilete spore. Genus includes new species A. cancellosus.	
Camptotriletes inaequabilis	Sp. nov	Valid	Playford	Carboniferous (Mississippian)	Lyall Formation	Australia	A trilete spore.	
Camptotriletes suggrandis	Sp. nov	Valid	Playford	Carboniferous (Mississippian)	Lyall Formation	Australia	A trilete spore.	
Convolutispora inreligata	Sp. nov	Valid	Playford	Carboniferous (Mississippian)	Lyall Formation	Australia	A trilete spore.	
Endosporites circumsaeptus	Sp. nov	Valid	Playford	Carboniferous (Mississippian)	Lyall Formation	Australia	A trilete spore.	
Foveosporites magnus	Sp. nov	Valid	Playford	Carboniferous (Mississippian)	Lyall Formation	Australia	A trilete spore.	
Granulatisporites commutabilis	Sp. nov	Valid	Playford	Carboniferous (Mississippian)	Lyall Formation	Australia	A trilete spore.	
Paxillitriletes permicus	Sp. nov	In press	Sui, McLoughlin & Feng in Sui et al.	Permian (Wuchiapingian–Changhsingian)	Xuanwei Formation	China	A lycophyte megaspore.	
Sergipea multipapillata	Sp. nov		Hu et al.	Early Cretaceous	Bongor Basin	Chad	A gymnosperm pollen.	
Sparganiaceaepollenites reticulatus	Sp. nov	Junior homonym	Samant et al.	Late Cretaceous (Maastrichtian)	Mandla Formation	India	Pollen of a member of the family Typhaceae/Sparganiaceae. The name is preoccupied by Sparganiaceaepollenites reticulatus Doktorowicz-Hrebnicka (1960) ex Krutzsch & Vanhoorne (1977); DeBenedetti et al. (2025) coined a replacement name Sparganiaceaepollenites intertrappeansis.	
Volkheimerites	Gen. et sp. nov	In press	Narváez et al.	Paleocene (Danian)	Salamanca Formation	Argentina	Pollen of a flowering plant. The type species is V. labyrinthus.	
Yezopollis	Gen. et sp. nov	In press	Legrand, Yamada & Nishida	Late Cretaceous (Cenomanian–Turonian)	Mikasa Formation	Japan	A Normapolles-type flowering plant pollen. Genus includes new species Y. mikasaensis.	

== Research ==
- Review of the studies on the origin of the land flora is published by Bowman (2022).
- A study on the evolution of body plans of members of Viridiplantae, based on a review of the fossil record, molecular data and developmental biology, is published by Niklas & Tiffney (2022).
- A study on the biodiversity of land plants at the equator during their first major diversification in the Late Silurian–Early Devonian is published by Wellman et al. (2022).
- A study on the evolution of heterospory during the Devonian is published by Leslie & Bonacorsi (2022).
- Seven coniferous nurse logs that have been colonized by conifer and equisetalean roots are reported from four Permian intervals in the Ordos Basin (China) by Feng et al. (2022), indicating that conifer tree stems probably functioned as hosts to both conspecific and interspecific seedlings in the Cathaysian Flora.
- A study on the impact of the Intertropical Convergence Zone in the emerging South Atlantic region on Aptian plant communities from eight Brazilian sedimentary basins is published by Carvalho et al. (2022), who report evidence of an overall predominance of xerophytic plants, attesting to more dry conditions, and of a humidification trend towards the end of the late Aptian resulting in the predominance of hydrophytes, hygrophytes, tropical lowland flora and upland flora, indicative of prevalence of lowland and montane rainforests.
- A study on the distribution and relative abundances of major plant groups from the Albian Gates Formation (Alberta, Canada) is published by Kalyniuk et al. (2022).
- A study on the relationship between whole-genome duplication, seed traits and the selectivity of the survival of plants during the Cretaceous–Paleogene extinction event is published by Berry & Jaganathan (2022).
- New Oligocene flora is described from the Dong Ho Formation (Vietnam) by Huang et al. (2022), who interpret the studied fossils as evidence of long-term environmental, floristic and vegetational stability in this region since the Paleogene.
- Gentis et al. (2022) describe fossil wood specimens from the Miocene Natma Formation (Myanmar), representing an assemblage dominated by members of the families Fabaceae and Dipterocarpaceae, interpreted as coming from different types of low altitude forest ecosystems (tropical wet evergreen, tropical dry and deciduous, and tropical littoral), and interpreted as indicative of a monsoonal climate with an alternance of a dry season and a wet season.
- Abundant compression floras dominated by angiosperm leaves are described from two sites of probable Pliocene age in Brunei by Wilf et al. (2022), who interpret these floras as evidence of dipterocarp-dominated lowland rainforests in the Malay Archipelago before the Pleistocene.
- A study on the impact of the extinct Neotropical megafauna on the variability in plant functional traits and biome geography in Central and South America is published by Dantas & Pausas (2022).
- A study on plant material from rock overhangs from mid-late Holocene sites along the Kawarau-Cromwell-Roxburgh Gorges in Central Otago (New Zealand), much of which was likely transported as roosting material or consumed by moa birds, and on its implications for the knowledge of the mid-late Holocene regional vegetation of Central Otago and the knowledge of vegetation changes since mid-late Holocene, is published by Pole (2022).
- A study on the role of hydraulic failure in the evolution of early vascular plants is published by Bouda et al. (2022), suggesting that drought selection played a key role in the diversification of vascular arrangements beginning with the Devonian explosion.
