= 2023 in paleobotany =

This paleobotany list records new fossil plant taxa that were described during the year 2023, as well as notes other significant paleobotany discoveries and events which occurred during 2023.

== Algae ==
=== Charophytes ===
Name	Novelty	Status	Authors	Age	Unit	Location	Synonymized taxa	Notes	Images
Chara chhindwaraensis	Sp. nov	Valid	Khosla et al.	Late Cretaceous-Paleocene transition	Deccan Intertrappean Beds	India		A species of Chara.	
Hornichara jianglingensis	Comb. nov		(Wang)	Eocene		China		A member of the family Characeae. Moved from Obtusochara jianglingensis Wang (1978).	
Microchara shivarudrappai	Sp. nov	Valid	Khosla et al.	Late Cretaceous-Paleocene transition	Deccan Intertrappean Beds	India			
Platychara closasi	Sp. nov	Valid	Khosla et al.	Late Cretaceous-Paleocene transition	Deccan Intertrappean Beds	India			

=== Chlorophytes ===
Name	Novelty	Status	Authors	Age	Unit	Location	Synonymized taxa	Notes	Images
Acicularia guizhouensis	Sp. nov	Valid	Bucur, Enos & Minzoni	Middle Triassic		China		A green alga belonging to the group Dasycladales.	
Archaeochaeta	Gen. et sp. nov	Valid	Maloney et al.	Tonian	Dolores Creek Formation	Canada (Yukon)		The type species is A. guncho.	
Chaetocladus vasalemmense	Sp. nov		Kröger & Tinn in Kröger et al.	Ordovician (Sandbian)	Vasalemma Formation	Estonia			
Eocladus estoniense	Sp. nov		Kröger & Tinn in Kröger et al.	Ordovician (Sandbian)	Vasalemma Formation	Estonia			
Kantia granieri	Sp. nov	Valid	Bucur, Enos & Minzoni	Middle Triassic		China		A green alga belonging to the group Dasycladales.	
Kantia intusannulata	Sp. nov	Valid	Bucur, Enos & Minzoni	Middle Triassic		China		A green alga belonging to the group Dasycladales.	
Kantia muxinanii	Sp. nov	Valid	Bucur, Enos & Minzoni	Middle Triassic		China		A green alga belonging to the group Dasycladales.	
Palaeoulvaria	Gen. et sp. nov	Valid	Kolosov	Ediacaran	Byuk Formation	Russia		A green alga belonging to the group Ulvales. The type species is P. plate.	
Parachlamydomonas	Gen. et sp. nov	Valid	Gan et al.	Middle Triassic	Yanchang Formation	China		The type species is P. ellipasis.	
Paraeudorina	Gen. et sp. nov	Valid	Gan et al.	Middle Triassic	Yanchang Formation	China		The type species is P. spheroesis.	
Paraoocystis	Gen. et sp. nov	Valid	Gan et al.	Middle Triassic	Yanchang Formation	China		The type species is P. ovalsis.	
Pseudocarteria	Gen. et sp. nov		Gan et al.	Middle Triassic	Yanchang Formation	China		The type species is P. globuloesis. The generic name is shared with Pseudocarteria Ettl.	
Sphaeroplea striatocristata	Sp. nov		Perez Loinaze et al.	Late Cretaceous (Maastrichtian)	Chorrillo Formation	Argentina		A species of Sphaeroplea.	
Voronocladus	Gen. et sp. nov	In press	Skompski et al.	Silurian		Ukraine		Originally described as a green alga belonging to the group Dasycladales and the family Triploporellaceae; subsequently argued by LoDuca (2024) to be a member of Bryopsidales. Genus includes new species V. dryganti.	

=== Phycological research ===
- Harvey (2023) interprets a well-preserved assemblage of acritarchs from the Cambrian Stage 4 Forteau Formation (Canada) as fossil material of planktic green algae with coenobial colony formation.
- Yang et al. (2023) reinterpret Protomelission as an early dasycladalean green alga; however, Xiang et al. (2023) subsequently interpret Protomelission as a scleritome of Cambroclavus, which in turn is considered by the authors to be a probable epitheliozoan-grade eumetazoan like the contemporaneous chancelloriids, unrelated to bryozoans or to dasycladalean algae.

== Lycophytes ==
Name	Novelty	Status	Authors	Age	Unit	Location	Synonymized taxa	Notes	Images
Nothostigma sepeensis	Sp nov		Spiekermann, Jasper, Guerra-Sommer & D. Uhl	Early Permian; Cisuralian		Brazil		An herbaceous lycopsid	
Selaginella quatsinoense	Sp. nov	Valid	Rothwell & Stockey	Early Cretaceous (Valanginian)	Longarm Formation	Canada (British Columbia)		A species of Selaginella.	
Thomasites	Gen., sp. et comb. nov		Bek et al.	Carboniferous		Czech Republic; Germany		A herbaceous lycophyte. Genus includes new species T. serratus also includes Lycopodites elongatus Goldenberg (1855).	

=== Lycophyte research ===
- A study on the ground-level trunk vasculature of Sigillaria approximata from the Pennsylvanian Calhoun Coal of Illinois (United States) is published by D'Antonio (2023), who finds evidence indicating that wood growth at the base of the trunk was different from the arborescent lycopsid wood growth model of Cichan (1985).
- Turner et al. (2023) report diverse phyllotaxis in leaves of the lycopod Asteroxylon mackiei from the Devonian Rhynie chert (United Kingdom), including whorls and spirals, and interpret this finding as suggesting that Fibonacci-style patterning was not ancestral to living land plants, as well as indicative of developmental similarities between lycophyte leaves and reproductive structures.

== Ferns and fern allies ==
Name	Novelty	Status	Authors	Age	Unit	Location	Synonymized taxa	Notes	Images
Botryopteridium sinensis	Sp. nov		Zhou et al.	Permian		China		A botryopterid fern.	
Conustheca	Gen. et comb. nov		Fernández & Césari	Carboniferous-Permian transition	Bajo de Véliz Formation	Argentina		A member of Equisetales. The type species is Tchernovia? velizensis Durán, Hünicken & Antón (1997).	
Diplazites campbellii	Sp. nov		Pšenička et al.	Carboniferous; Kasimovian		Canada; Nova Scotia		A psaroniaceous marattialean fern.	
Dizeugotheca saudica	Comb. nov		(Wagner, Hill & El-Khayal)	Permian		Saudi Arabia		A member of the family Marattiaceae. Moved from Gemellitheca saudica Wagner, Hill & El-Khayal (1985).	
Dryopterites beishanensis	Sp nov		Ren & Sun	Late Cretaceous	Chijinbao Formation	China		A fern First announced in 2022; Officially published in 2023	
Equisetum kekeense	Sp. nov		Zhang & Xie in Cao et al.	Miocene	Youshashan Formation	China		A species of Equisetum.	
Equisetum siwalikum	Sp. nov		Kundu, Hazra & Khan in Kundu et al.	Miocene		India		A species of Equisetum.	
Equisetum wulanense	Sp. nov		Zhang & Xie in Cao et al.	Miocene	Youshashan Formation	China		A species of Equisetum.	
Goeppertella unicyclica	Sp. nov		Escapa & Yañez in Yañez, Escapa & Choo	Early Jurassic (Pliensbachian)		Argentina		A member of the family Dipteridaceae.	
Microlepia burmasia	Sp. nov	Valid	Long, Wang, & Shi	Cretaceous	Burmese amber	Myanmar		A fern of uncertain affinities. Originally described as a dennstaedtiaceous fern, but this classification was contested by Zhang (2024). Published online in 2022, but the issue date of the article naming it is listed as March 2023.	
Palaeosorum siwalikum	Sp. nov	Valid	Kundu, Hazra & Khan in Kundu et al.	Miocene		India		A member of the family Polypodiaceae. Announced in 2023; the final version of the article naming it was published in 2024.	
Prosperifilix	Gen. et sp. nov	In press	Wang, Shi & Engel in et al.	Cretaceous	Burmese amber	Myanmar		A member of the family Dryopteridaceae. The type species is P. sepeliogladius.	
Qasimia archangelskyi	Sp. nov		Kerp et al.	Permian	Umm Irna Formation	Jordan		A member of the family Marattiaceae.	
Szea yunnanensis	Sp. nov		Guo, Zhou & Feng in Guo et al.	Permian (Lopingian)	Xuanwei Formation	China		A leptosporangiate fern.	
Todea minutacaulis	Sp. nov		Walker, Rothwell & Stockey	Early Cretaceous (Valanginian)		Canada (British Columbia)		A species of Todea.	
Trichomanes angustum	Comb. nov		(Li & Wang)	Cretaceous (Albian-Cenomanian)	Burmese amber	Myanmar		A member of the family Hymenophyllaceae, a species of Trichomanes sensu lato. Moved from Hymenophyllites angustus Li & Wang (2022).	

=== Pteridological research ===
- A study on fossils of Pecopteris from the Mazon Creek fossil beds (Illinois, United States), indicative of association of a suite of saturated phytohopanoid and aromatised terpenoid diagenetic biomarker products with true fern fossils, is published by Tripp et al. (2023).
- Blanco-Moreno & Buscalioni (2023) identify Sphenopteris wonnacottii as a junior synonym of Coniopteris laciniata, provide whole plant reconstruction of C. laciniata, and interpret the variability of the pinnules of C. laciniata as likely caused by the submersion of the apical part of fronds in water during their development.

== Ginkgophytes ==
Name	Novelty	Status	Authors	Age	Unit	Location	Synonymized taxa	Notes	Images
Austroginkgoxylon	Gen. et sp. nov		Martínez & Leppe in Martínez et al.	Late Cretaceous (Maastrichtian)	Dorotea Formation	Chile		A member of Ginkgoales. The type species is A. dutrae.	
Eretmophyllum polypapillosum	Sp. nov	Valid	Frolov & Mashchuk	Jurassic	Prisayan Formation	Russia			
Eretmophyllum yershowskiensis	Sp. nov	Valid	Frolov & Mashchuk	Jurassic	Prisayan Formation	Russia			
Ginkgo henanensis	Sp. nov	Valid	Li & Xu in Li et al.	Paleocene	Dazhang Formation	China		A species of Ginkgo.	
Karkenia archangelskiana	Sp. nov		Nosova in Nosova, Kostina & Afonin	Early Cretaceous (Aptian–Albian)	Khuren Dukh Formation	Mongolia		A member of the family Karkeniaceae.	
Sphenobaiera krassilovii	Sp. nov		Nosova, Kostina & Afonin	Early Cretaceous (Aptian–Albian)	Khuren Dukh Formation	Mongolia			

== Conifers ==
=== Cheirolepidiaceae ===
Name	Novelty	Status	Authors	Age	Unit	Location	Synonymized taxa	Notes	Images
Classostrobus archangelskyi	Sp. nov		Kvaček, Mendes & Tekleva	Cretaceous (late Aptian-early Albian)	Figueira da Foz Formation	Portugal			
Pararaucaria laiyangensis	Sp. nov		Jin et al.	Early Cretaceous	Laiyang Formation	China			
Pseudofrenelopsis dinisii	Sp. nov		Mendes, Kvaček & Doyle	Cretaceous (Hauterivian?)	Santa Susana Formation	Portugal		A cheirolepidiaceous foliage morphospecies	
Pseudofrenelopsis zlatkoi	Sp. nov		Kvaček & Mendes	Cretaceous (late Aptian-early Albian)	Figueira da Foz Formation	Portugal		A cheirolepidiaceous foliage morphospecies	

=== Cordaitaceae ===
Name	Novelty	Status	Authors	Age	Unit	Location	Synonymized taxa	Notes	Images
Florinanthus bussacensis	Sp. nov		Correia et al.	Carboniferous (Gzhelian)		Portugal			
Florinanthus longiantheratus	Sp. nov		Bureš et al.	Carboniferous (Moscovian)	Plzeň Basin	Czech Republic		Pollen-bearing organs of a member of Cordaitales.	

=== Cupressaceae ===
Name	Novelty	Status	Authors	Age	Unit	Location	Synonymized taxa	Notes	Images
Amurodendron	Gen. et sp. nov	Valid	Sokolova et al.	Paleocene		Russia (Amur Oblast)		A conifer with affinities with the family Cupressaceae. The type species is A. pilosum. Published online in 2024, but the issue date is listed as December 2023.	
Juniperus chifengensis	Sp. nov		Xiao & Guo in Guo et al.	Miocene		China		A species of Juniper.	
Mukawastrobus arnoldii	Sp. nov	Valid	Rothwell, Stockey & Smith	Late Cretaceous		United States (Alaska)		A taiwanioid cupressaceous conifer.	

=== Pinaceae ===
Name	Novelty	Status	Authors	Age	Unit	Location	Synonymized taxa	Notes	Images
Keteleeria farjonii	Sp. nov	Valid	Wheeler, Manchester & Baas	Eocene	John Day Formation	United States (Oregon)		A species of Keteleeria.	
Keteleeria huolinhensis	Sp. nov		Zhu et al.	Early Cretaceous	Huolinhe Formation	China		A species of Keteleeria.	
Pinus bukatkinii	Sp. nov	Valid	Bazhenova et al.	Middle Jurassic		Russia (Belgorod Oblast)		A pine.	
Tsuga weichangensis	Sp. nov	In press	Li et al.	Miocene		China		A species of Tsuga. Announced in Feb 2023, formally published Jan 2024	

=== Podocarpaceae ===
Name	Novelty	Status	Authors	Age	Type locality	Location	Synonymy	Notes	Images
Acmopyle grayae	Sp. nov		Andruchow-Colombo et al.	Eocene	Laguna del Hunco Formation	Argentina		A species of Acmopyle.	
Dacrycarpus engelhardti	Comb. nov		(Berry)	Eocene		Argentina		A species of Dacrycarpus. Moved from Podocarpus engelhardti Berry (1938).	
Phyllocladoxylon antarcticum	Sp. nov	valid	Pujana et al.	Oligocene	San José Formation	Chile		A podocarpaceous wood morphospecies Announced in 2022; Officially published in 2023	
Podocarpoxylon paradoxi	Sp. nov		Martínez & Leppe in Martínez et al.	Late Cretaceous (Maastrichtian)	Dorotea Formation	Chile		A podocarpaceous wood morphospecies.	
Podocarpoxylon resinosum	Sp. nov	valid	Pujana et al.	Oligocene	San José Formation	Chile		A podocarpaceous wood morphospecies Announced in 2022; Officially published in 2023	

=== Voltziales ===
Name	Novelty	Status	Authors	Age	Type locality	Location	Synonymy	Notes	Images
Hexicladia	Gen. et sp. nov	Valid	Wang et al.	Permian (Cisuralian)	Shanxi Formation	China		A voltzialean conifer. The type species is H. yongchangensis. Announced in 2022; Officially published in 2023	

=== Other conifers ===
Name	Novelty	Status	Authors	Age	Unit	Location	Synonymized taxa	Notes	Images
Brachyoxylon qijiangense	Sp. nov		Xie, Wang & Tian in Xie et al.	Middle Jurassic	Shaximiao Formation	China		A member of Pinales of uncertain affinities.	
Brachyphyllum dimorpha	Sp. nov		Morales-Toledo & Cevallos-Ferriz	Middle Jurassic	Otlaltepec Formation	Mexico		Coniferous foliage of uncertain affinities.	
Mirovia oskolica	Sp. nov		Nosova in Nosova & Lyubarova	Middle Jurassic (Bajocian–Callovian)		Russia (Belgorod Oblast)		Coniferous leaves assigned to the family Miroviaceae.	
Parnaiboxylon wangi	Sp. nov		Wang et al.	Carboniferous (Moscovian)	Benxi Formation	China		A coniferous petrified wood.	
Platycladium mexicana	Sp. nov		Morales-Toledo & Cevallos-Ferriz	Middle Jurassic	Otlaltepec Formation	Mexico			
Secrospiroxylon	Gen. et sp. nov	Valid	Cai, Zhang & Feng in Cai et al.	Permian		Mongolia		A coniferous stem. The type species is S. tolgoyensis.	
Yiwupitys	Gen. et sp. nov		Gou & Feng in Gou et al.	Middle Jurassic	Xishanyao Formation	China		A conifer stem of uncertain affinities. The type species is Y. elegans.	

=== Conifer research ===
- Trümper et al. (2023) report the discovery of fossil trees from the Athesian Volcanic Group (Italy) interpreted as remains of a Permian (Kungurian) forest where conifers were the major arborescent plants, substantiating the presence of coniferopsids in wetlands around the Carboniferous/Permian boundary.
- Slodownik et al. (2023) describe new fossil material (including the first putative female reproductive remains) of Araucarioides linearis from the Eocene Macquarie Harbour Formation (Australia), interpret Araucarioides sinuosa to be a junior synonym of A. linearis, and consider A. linearis to be a non-Agathis agathioid belonging to an extinct lineage that originated in the Cretaceous, lived in high paleolatitudes and had adaptations to seasonal environments which allowed it to survive the Cretaceous–Paleogene extinction event.
- Andruchow-Colombo et al. (2023) review the fossil record of Podocarpaceae, and argue that the earliest reliable occurrences of members of this family are from the Jurassic of both hemispheres.

== Flowering plants ==
=== Monocots ===
==== Alismatales ====
Name	Novelty	Status	Authors	Age	Unit	Location	Synonymized taxa	Notes	Images
Appianospadix	Gen. et sp. nov	Valid	Stockey et al.	Eocene		Canada (British Columbia)		A member of the family Araceae. The type species is A. bogneri	
Nichima	Gen. et 2 sp. nov		Hernández-Sandoval, Cevallos-Ferriz & Hernández-Damián	Oligocene-Miocene		Mexico		A member of the family Alismataceae. Genus includes N. magalloniae and N. gonzalez-medranoi.	

==== Arecales ====
Name	Novelty	Status	Authors	Age	Unit	Location	Synonymized taxa	Notes	Images
Cryosophiloxylon indicum	Sp. nov	Valid	Kumar & Khan	Cretaceous (Maastrichtian)-Paleocene (Danian)	Deccan Intertrappean Beds	India		A member of the tribe Cryosophileae. Published online in 2023; the final version of the article naming it was published in 2024.	
Palmocarpon dicellaformis	Comb. nov		(Berry)	Oligocene		Peru	synonymy: Matayba belenensis Berry (1929)	A palm fruit with affinities to extant Bactridinae. Moved from Carpolithus dicellaformis Berry (1929).	
Sabalites siwalicus	Sp. nov	Valid	Mahato & Khan	Miocene	Chunabati Formation	India		Published online in 2024, but the issue date is listed as December 2023.	

=== Basal eudicots ===
Name	Novelty	Status	Authors	Age	Unit	Location	Synonymized taxa	Notes	Images
Macginitiea basilobata	Comb. nov		(Ward)	Paleocene		United States (Montana)		Moved from Platanus basilobata Ward (1887).	
Macginitiea rannii	Sp. nov	"Kisinger Lakes flora"	Huegele & Correa Narvaez	Eocene		United States (Wyoming)			
Macginitiea rileyi	Comb. nov		(Ball)	Eocene		United States (Texas)		Moved from Platanus rileyi Ball (1939).	
Megahertzia paleoamplexicaulis	Sp. nov	Valid	Carpenter & Rozefelds	Eocene	Salt Creek Formation	Australia		A species of Megahertzia	
Notocyamus	Gen. et sp. nov		Gobo et al in Gobo et al.	Early Cretaceous (Barremian?/Aptian)	Crato Formation	Brazil		A Nelumbonaceous lotus. The type species is N. hydrophobus.	
Palaeosinomenium oisensis	Sp. nov	Valid	Kara et al.	Paleocene		France		A member of the family Menispermaceae. Published online in 2023; the final version of the article naming it was published in 2024.	
Zizyphoides retusa	Comb. nov	Valid	(Heer)	Probably late Eocene		Norway		A member of the family Trochodendraceae. Moved from Populus retusa Heer (1876).	

==== Basal eudicot research ====
- Evidence from the palynomorph fossil record, interpreted as indicating that members of the family Proteaceae reached South African Cape in the Late Cretaceous from North-Central Africa rather than from Australia across the Indian Ocean, is presented by Lamont, He & Cowling (2023).

=== Superasterids ===
==== Apiales ====
Name	Novelty	Status	Authors	Age	Unit	Location	Synonymized taxa	Notes	Images
Plerandreoxylon oskolskii	Sp. nov	Valid	Wheeler, Manchester & Baas	Eocene	John Day Formation	United States (Oregon)		A member of the family Araliaceae.	

==== Boraginales ====
Name	Novelty	Status	Authors	Age	Unit	Location	Synonymized taxa	Notes	Images
Cordioxylon indicum	Sp. nov	Valid	Bhatia, Srivastava & Mehrotra	Miocene	Tipam Sandstone	India		Fossil wood of a member of the genus Cordia. Announced in 2023; the final version of the article naming it was published in 2024.	

==== Ericales ====
Name	Novelty	Status	Authors	Age	Unit	Location	Synonymized taxa	Notes	Images
Symplocos kowalewskii	Comb nov	Valid	(Casp.) Sadowski & Hofmann	Eocene; Priabonian	Baltic Amber	Europe		A Symplocaceous flower species. Moved from Stewartia kowalewskii (1886).	Symplocos kowalewskii

==== Icacinales ====
Name	Novelty	Status	Authors	Age	Unit	Location	Synonymized taxa	Notes	Images
Palaeophytocrene ga	Sp. nov		Poore, Jud & Gandolfo	Paleocene (Danian)	Salamanca Formation	Argentina		A member of the family Icacinaceae belonging to the tribe Phytocreneae.	

==== Lamiales ====
Name	Novelty	Status	Authors	Age	Unit	Location	Synonymized taxa	Notes	Images
Phillyreoxylon phillyreoides	Sp. nov		Akkemik & Mantzouka in Akkemik et al.	Neogene		Turkey		Fossil wood of a member of the genus Phillyrea.	

==== Solanales ====
Name	Novelty	Status	Authors	Age	Unit	Location	Synonymized taxa	Notes	Images
Eophysaloides	Gen. et sp. nov	Valid	Deanna et al.	Eocene	Esmeraldas Formation	Colombia		A member of the family Solanaceae. The type species is E. inflata.	
Lycianthoides	Gen. et sp. nov	Valid	Deanna et al.	Eocene	Green River Formation; Parachute Creek Member	United States (Colorado)		A member of the family Solanaceae. The type species is L. calycina.	

=== Superrosids ===
==== Cucurbitales ====
Name	Novelty	Status	Authors	Age	Unit	Location	Synonymized taxa	Notes	Images
Parvaspicula	Gen. et comb. nov	Valid	Correa et al.	Eocene; Ypresian	Green River Formation	United States (Colorado)	Antholithes pendula R.W. Brown, 1929	A tetramelaceous seed morphotype The type species is P. lepidioides Moved from Clethra (?) lepidioides Cockerell (1925)	
Punctaphyllum	Gen. et comb. nov	Valid	Correa Narvaez et al.	Eocene; Ypresian	Green River Formation	United States (Colorado)	Aleurites glandulosa (Brown) MacGinitie, 1969; Dendropanax latens MacGinitie, 1974	A tetramelaceous leaf morphotype The type species is P. glandulosa Moved from Cucurbita glandulosa Brown (1929)	

==== Fabales ====
Name	Novelty	Status	Authors	Age	Unit	Location	Synonymized taxa	Notes	Images
Acacia haominiae	Sp. nov		Wang et al.	Miocene	Fotan Group	China		A species of Acacia.	
Albizia yenbaiensis	Sp. nov	Valid	Nguyen, Su & J. Huang in Nguyen et al.	Miocene	Yen Bai Basin	Vietnam		An Albizia species. Announced in 2022; Officially published January 2023	
Anthonotha shimaglae	Sp. nov	Valid	Pan et al.	Miocene	Mush Valley	Ethiopia		A species of Anthonotha.	
Bauhinia tibetensis	Sp. nov		Gao & Su in Gao et al.	Paleocene		China		A species of Bauhinia.	
Englerodendron mulugetanum	Sp. nov	Valid	Pan et al.	Miocene	Mush Valley	Ethiopia		A species of Englerodendron.	
Entada simojovelensis	Sp. nov		Estrada-Ruiz & Gómez-Acevedo	Miocene	Simojovel Group	Mexico		A species of Entada.	
Goniorrhachisinoxylon	Gen. et sp. nov		Dutra, Martínez & Wilberger	Oligocene		Brazil		A member of Detarioideae. The type species is G. sergioarchangelskii.	

==== Fagales ====
Name	Novelty	Status	Authors	Age	Unit	Location	Synonymized taxa	Notes	Images
Carya leroyii	Sp. nov	Valid	Wheeler, Manchester & Baas	Eocene	John Day Formation	United States (Oregon)		A hickory.	
Engelhardia guipingensis	Sp. nov		Song & Jin in Song et al.	Miocene	Erzitang Formation	China		A species of Engelhardia.	
Gymnostoma stuartii	Sp. nov		Whang, Hill & Hill	Neogene		Australia		A species of Gymnostoma.	
Leguminocarpum meghalayensis	Sp. nov	valid	Bhatia, Srivastava & Mehrotra	Late Paleocene	Tura Formation	India		A fabaceous seed pod morphospecies. Announced in 2022; Officially published in 2023	
Nothofagoxylon ruei	Sp. nov	valid	Pujana et al.	Oligocene	San José Formation	Chile		A nothofagaceous wood morphospecies Announced in 2022; Officially published in 2023	
Parvileguminophyllum damalgiriensis	Sp. nov	Valid	Bhatia, Srivastava & Mehrotra	Late Paleocene	Tura Formation	India		A fabaceous legume leaf morphospecies. Announced in 2022; Officially published in 2023	

==== Malpighiales ====
Name	Novelty	Status	Authors	Age	Unit	Location	Synonymized taxa	Notes	Images
Elatine odgaardii	Sp. nov	Valid	Bennike in Bennike et al.	Probably early Pleistocene		Greenland		A species of Elatine. Announced in 2022; the final article version was published in 2023.	
Macaranga kirkjohnsonii	Sp. nov		Wilf, Iglesias & Gandolfo	Eocene (Ypresian)	Huitrera Formation	Argentina		A species of Macaranga.	
Passiflora sulcatasperma	Sp. nov		Hermsen	Pliocene	Gray Fossil Site	United States (Tennessee)		A species of Passiflora.	
Tineafructus	Gen. et sp. nov		Wilf, Iglesias & Gandolfo	Eocene (Ypresian)	Huitrera Formation	Argentina		A member of the family Euphorbiaceae belonging to the subfamily Acalyphoideae and the tribe Acalypheae. The type species is T. casamiquelae.	
Trigonostemon zhangpuensis	Sp. nov	Valid	Dong & Sun in Zheng et al.	Miocene	Fotan Group	China		A species of Trigonostemon.	

==== Malvales ====
Name	Novelty	Status	Authors	Age	Unit	Location	Synonymized taxa	Notes	Images
Bombax asiatica	Sp. nov	Valid	Hazra, Bera & Khan	Pliocene		India		A species of Bombax.	
Cistoxylon cistoides	Sp. nov		Akkemik & Mantzouka in Akkemik et al.	Neogene		Turkey			
Elizabethiaxylon	Gen. et sp. nov	In press	Ruiz, Pujana & Brea	Paleocene	Salamanca Formation	Argentina		Fossil wood of a plant related to the Malvaceae. The type species is E. patagonicum.	
Notomalvaceoxylon	Gen. et sp. nov		Martínez & Leppe in Martínez et al.	Late Cretaceous (Maastrichtian)	Dorotea Formation	Chile		Fossil wood of a plant belonging to the Malvaceae. The type species is N. magallanense.	
Pterospermum shuangxingii	Sp. nov	Valid	Zhao, Huang & Su in Zhao et al.	Miocene	Sanhaogou Formation	China		A species of Pterospermum.	

==== Myrtales ====
Name	Novelty	Status	Authors	Age	Unit	Location	Synonymized taxa	Notes	Images
Conocarpoxylon	Gen. et sp. nov		Ramos et al.	Pleistocene	El Palmar Formation	Argentina		Fossil wood of a member of the family Combretaceae. Genus includes new species C. cristalliferum.	
Duabanga makumensis	Sp. nov	Valid	Bhatia, Srivastava & Mehrotra	Oligocene (Chattian)	Tikak Parbat Formation	India		A species of Duabanga.	
Myrtineoxylon hoffmannae	Sp. nov	valid	Pujana et al.	Oligocene	San José Formation	Chile		A myrtaceous wood morphospecies. Announced in 2022; Officially published in 2023	
Sonneratioxylon barrocoloradoensis	Sp. nov		Pérez-Lara in Martínez et al.	Miocene (Aquitanian)		Panama		A member of the family Lythraceae.	
Terminalioxylon paravirens	Sp. nov		Ramos et al.	Pleistocene	El Palmar Formation	Argentina		Fossil wood of a member of the family Combretaceae.	
Terminalioxylon ushun	Sp. nov		Ramos et al.	Pleistocene	El Palmar Formation	Argentina		Fossil wood of a member of the family Combretaceae.	
Trapa haominiae	Sp. nov		Wu et al.	Miocene	Fotan Group	China		A species of Trapa.	

==== Oxalidales ====
Name	Novelty	Status	Authors	Age	Unit	Location	Synonymized taxa	Notes	Images
Weinmannioxylon trichospermoides	Sp. nov	valid	Pujana et al.	Oligocene	San José Formation	Chile		A cunoniaceous wood morphospecies. Announced in 2022; Officially published in 2023	

==== Rosales ====
Name	Novelty	Status	Authors	Age	Unit	Location	Synonymized taxa	Notes	Images
Aphananthe manchesteri	Sp. nov	Valid	Hernández-Damián, Rubalcava-Knoth & Cevallos Ferriz	Miocene	La Quinta Formation (Mexican amber)	Mexico		A species of Aphananthe.	
Eopaliura	Gen. et sp. nov		Patel, Rana & Khan in Patel et al.	Eocene	Palana Formation	India		A member of the family Rhamnaceae belonging to the tribe Paliureae. The type species is E. indica.	
Ficus paleoauriculata	Sp. nov		Chandra et al.	Paleogene		India		A species of Ficus.	
Ficus paleodicranostyla	Sp. nov		Chandra et al.	Paleogene		India		A species of Ficus.	
Ficus paleovariegata	Sp. nov		Chandra et al.	Paleogene		India		A species of Ficus.	
Gouianiaites	Gen. et sp. nov	Valid	Centeno-González, Porras-Múzquiz & Estrada-Ruiz	Late Cretaceous (Campanian)	Olmos Formation	Mexico		A member of the family Rhamnaceae. Genus includes new species G. muzquizensis.	
Helicostyloxylon	Gen. et sp. nov	Valid	Martinez Martinez	Miocene	Ituzaingó Formation	Argentina		A member of the family Moraceae. Genus includes new species H. paranensis.	
Kageneckia coloradensis	Comb. nov	Valid	(Knowlton) Denk et al.	Eocene; Priabonian	Florissant Formation	United States (Colorado)	Myrica amygdalina auct. non Saporta nec Lesquereux (1883)	A species of Kageneckia. Moved from Myrica coloradensis (1916).	
Ulmus palaeoparvifolia	Sp. nov		Lu et al.	Miocene	Xiaolongtan Formation	China		An elm.	
Urticaleoxylon	Gen. et sp. nov	Valid	Wheeler, Manchester & Baas	Eocene	John Day Formation	United States (Oregon)		A member of Rosales with features found in urticalean families. The type species is U. stevensii.	
Vauquelinia aculeata	Comb. nov	Valid	(Saporta) Denk et al.	Oligocene; Chattian	Aix-en-Provence Formation	France	synonymy: Myrica matheronii (1873); Myrica dryomorpha (1889)	A species of Vauquelinia. Moved from Myrica aculeata (1873); First named Banksites aculeatus (1862).	
Vauquelinia obscura	Comb. nov	Valid	(Saporta) Denk et al.	Oligocene; Rupelian	Saint-Zacharie Limestone	France	synonymy: Quercus kubinyi auct. non (Kováts) Czeczott, nec Gemici et al., 1991; Carya serrae-folia auct. non (Göppert) Kräusel, nec Gemici et al., 1991	A species of Vauquelinia. Moved from Banksites obscurus Saporta (1863).	
Vauquelinia serra	Comb. nov	Valid	(Unger) Denk et al.	Miocene	Parschlug Basin	Austria	synonymy: Amygdalus pereger (1850); Ulmus fischeri auct. non Heer, nec Butzmann et al., 2009	A species of Vauquelinia. Moved from Prinsepia serra (2004); First named Quercus serra (1847).	

==== Sapindales ====
Name	Novelty	Status	Authors	Age	Unit	Location	Synonymized taxa	Notes	Images
Aesculus constabularisii	Sp. nov	Valid	Wheeler, Manchester & Baas	Eocene	John Day Formation	United States (Oregon)		A species of Aesculus.	
Bursericarpum indicum	Sp. nov	Valid	Kumar et al.	Cretaceous-Paleogene transition	Deccan Intertrappean Beds	India		A burseraceous fruit.	
Burseroxylon panzai	Sp. nov		Rombola et al.	Late Cretaceous	Cardiel Formation	Argentina		Fossil wood with possible affinities with Anacardiaceae or Burseraceae.	
Canarium leenhoutsii	Sp. nov	In press	Beurel et al.	Miocene	Zhangpu amber	China		A species of Canarium.	
Canarium wangboi	Sp. nov	In press	Beurel et al.	Miocene	Zhangpu amber	China		A species of Canarium.	
Cyrtocarpa biapertura	Sp. nov	Valid	Del Rio et al.	Paleocene and Eocene		France		A species of Cyrtocarpa.	
Debursera	Gen. et sp. nov	Valid	Kumar et al.	Cretaceous-Paleogene transition	Deccan Intertrappean Beds	India		A burseraceous flower. The type species is D. indica.	
Klaassenoxylon	Gen. et sp. et comb. nov		Wheeler, Manchester & Baas	Eocene	John Day Formation	United States (Oregon)		A member of the family Sapindaceae. Genus includes new species K. wilkinsonii, as well as "Sapindoxylon" klaassenii Wheeler & Manchester (2002).	
Sahniocarpon deccanensis	Comb. nov	Valid	(Karanjekar)	Late Cretaceous		India		A member of the family Burseraceae. Moved from Cremocarpon deccanii Karanjekar (1984).	
Swietenia palaeomahagoni	Sp. nov	Valid	Chandra et al.	Paleogene		India		A species of Swietenia.	

==== Saxifragales ====
Name	Novelty	Status	Authors	Age	Unit	Location	Synonymized taxa	Notes	Images
Liquidambar hainanensis	Sp. nov		Maslova et al.	Eocene	Changchang Formation	China		A species of Liquidambar.	
Liquidambar ovoidea	Sp. nov		Maslova et al.	Eocene	Changchang Formation	China		A species of Liquidambar.	
Parrotia zhiyanii	Sp. nov	Valid	Wu et al.	Miocene	Zhangpu amber	China		A species of Parrotia. Published online in 2023; the final version of the article naming it was published in 2024.	

==== Other superrosids ====
Name	Novelty	Status	Authors	Age	Unit	Location	Synonymized taxa	Notes	Images
Friisifructus	Gen. et sp. nov	Valid	Tang, Smith & Atkinson	Late Cretaceous (Campanian)	Cedar District Formation	United States; Washington		Rosid clade fruits of uncertain affinities. The type species is F. aligeri.	

==== Superrosid research ====
- Nishino et al. (2023) study the composition of a fossil forest from the Miocene Nakamura Formation of the Mizunami Group (Japan), including stumps of Wataria parvipora and leaves of Byttneriophyllum tiliifolium, and interpret their finding as suggesting that W. parvipora and B. tiliifolium were parts of the same plant, as well as suggesting that Byttneriophyllum-bearing plants might have belonged to the subfamily Helicteroideae.

=== Other angiosperms ===
Name	Novelty	Status	Authors	Age	Unit	Location	Synonymized taxa	Notes	Images
Ascarinophyllum	Gen. et sp. nov	valid	Čepičková & Kvaček	Late Cretaceous (Cenomanian)	Peruc–Korycany Formation	Czech Republic		A Basal angiosperm leaf morphogenus Similar to Mesodescolea plicata and Chloranthaceae. The type species is A. pecinovense. Officially published in 2023	
Cinnamomum miocenicum	Sp. nov		Mahato, Hazra & Khan in Mahato et al.	Miocene	Chunabati Formation	India		A species of Cinnamomum.	
Compitoxylon	Gen. et sp. nov		Gentis, De Franceschi & Boura in Gentis et al.	Paleocene (Danian-Selandian)	Paunggyi Formation	Myanmar		Fossil wood with anatomical features found in diverse extant flowering plant groups, might be placed at the base of the asterids, close to Malpighiales, close to Proteales at the base of eudicots, or even in Laurales. The type species is C. paleocenicum.	
Magnolia hansnooteboomii	Sp. nov	Valid	Wheeler, Manchester & Baas	Eocene	John Day Formation	United States (Oregon)		A species of Magnolia.	
Palibinia comptonifolia	Comb. nov		(Brown) Manchester, Judd, & Kodrul	Eocene; Ypresian	Green River Formation	United States (Colorado)		A pentapetalean eudicot of uncertain affiliation. Moved from Vauquelinia comptonifolia (1969); Originally named Banksia comptonifolia (1934)	
Papillaephyllum	Gen. et sp. nov		Čepičková & Kvaček	Late Cretaceous (Cenomanian)	Peruc–Korycany Formation	Czech Republic		Foliage of a flowering plant, possibly with affinities with the family Chloranthaceae. The type species is P. labutae.	
Pteroheterochrosperma	Gen. et sp. nov	Valid	Smith, Greenwalt & Manchester	Eocene	Kishenehn Formation	United States (Montana)		Disseminules of uncertain affinities. The type species is P. horseflyensis.	Pteroheterochrosperma horseflyensis
Quadrasubulaflora	Gen. et sp. nov	Valid	Smith, Greenwalt & Manchester	Eocene	Kishenehn Formation	United States (Montana)		Seed of uncertain affinities Possibly related the family Apiaceae in the tribe Saniculeae or tribe Scandiceae and subtribe Scandicinae. The type species is Q. kishenehnensis.	Quadrasubulaflora kishenehnensis
Racheliflora	Gen. et sp. nov	Valid	Friis, Crane & Pedersen	Early Cretaceous	Potomac Group	United States (Virginia)		An early angiosperm of uncertain phylogenetic placement, most closely related to magnoliids, possibly with lauralean affinities. The type species is R. virginiensis.	
Todziaphyllum saportanum	Comb. nov	valid	(Velenovský) Čepičková & Kvaček	Late Cretaceous (Cenomanian)	Peruc–Korycany Formation	Czech Republic		A Basal angiosperm leaf morphogenus A new combination for Banksites saportanus Officially published in 2023	
Tortorellixylon	Gen. et sp. nov		Rombola et al.	Late Cretaceous	Cardiel Formation	Argentina		Fossil wood of a flowering plant of uncertain affinities. The type species is T. oligoporosum.	
Xilinia	Gen. et sp. nov		Wang et al.	Early Cretaceous (Albian)	Shengli Formation	China		An early angiosperm of uncertain affinities. The type species is X. shengliensis.	

- A study on the affinities of Santaniella, based on data from new fossil material from the Lower Cretaceous Crato Formation (Brazil), is published by Pessoa et al. (2023), who don't support the interpretation of Santaniella as a ranuculid, and consider it to be a mesangiosperm of uncertain affinities, possibly a magnoliid.
- Pessoa, Ribeiro & Christenhusz (2023) describe new fossil material of Araripia florifera from the Early Cretaceous of Brazil, interpret its anatomy as indicating that it did not belong to the family Calycanthaceae, and assign it to the new family Araripiaceae in the stem group of Laurales.

=== Angiosperm research ===
- A study aiming to determine the affinities of 24 exceptionally preserved fossil flowers is published by López-Martínez et al. (2023).
- A study aiming to determine the phylogenetic relationships of nine putative magnolialean fossils is published by Doyle & Endress (2023).
- Chambers & Poinar (2023) reinterpret Endobeuthos paleosum as a member of the family Proteaceae; this interpretation is subsequently contested by Lamont & Ladd (2024).
- A study on the diversification of the flowering plant throughout their evolutionary history is published by Thompson & Ramírez-Barahona (2023), who report evidence of stable extinction rates through time and find no evidence of a significant impact of the Cretaceous–Paleogene extinction event on the extinction rates of major flowering plant lineages.

== Other plants ==
Name	Novelty	Status	Authors	Age	Unit	Location	Synonymized taxa	Notes	Images
Aberlemnia junggaria	Sp. nov	In press	Liu & Xu in Liu et al.	Silurian (Přídolí)		China			
Aberlemnia krizii	Sp. nov		Libertín, Kvaček & Bek	Silurian (Přídolí)		Czech Republic		A vascular plant related to Lycophytina.	
Archangelskyoxylon	Gen. et sp. nov		Gnaedinger, Brea & Martínez	Early Jurassic (Sinemurian–Toarcian)	Roca Blanca Formation	Argentina		A member of the family Gnetidae. The type species is A. carlquistii.	
Arlenea	Gen. et sp. nov		Ribeiro et al.	Early Cretaceous	Crato Formation	Brazil		A member of the family Ephedraceae. The type species is A. delicata.	
Aysenoxylon	Gen et sp nov	valid	Pujana et al.	Oligocene	San José Formation	Chile		A wood morphospecies of uncertain affinity. The type species is A. patorarensis. Announced in 2022; Officially published in 2023	
Campylopus lusitanicus	Sp. nov	Valid	Hedenäs, Bomfleur & Friis in Bomfleur et al.	Early Cretaceous (Aptian–Albian)	Almargem Formation	Portugal		A moss, a species of Campylopus.	
Canaliculidium	Gen. et sp. nov	Valid	Hedenäs, Bomfleur & Friis in Bomfleur et al.	Early Cretaceous (Aptian–Albian)	Almargem Formation	Portugal		A moss belonging to the family Leucobryaceae. The type species is C. fissuratum.	
Capesporangites	Gen. et sp. nov		Uhlířová, Pšenička & Sakala	Silurian (Přídolí)		Czech Republic		A rhyniophytoid with bryophyte-like features. The type species is C. petrkraftii.	
Chlorosphagnum	Gen. et sp. nov	Valid	Hedenäs, Bomfleur & Friis in Bomfleur et al.	Early Cretaceous (Aptian–Albian)	Almargem Formation	Portugal		A moss, a member of Sphagnales of uncertain affinities. The type species is C. cateficense.	
Cycadodendron	Gen. et sp. nov	Valid	Luthardt, Rößler & Stevenson	Permian (Sakmarian–Artinskian)	Leukersdorf Formation	Germany		A gymnosperm with cycadalean affinities. The type species is C. galtieri.	
Daohugoucladus	Gen. et sp. nov		Yang et al.	Middle Jurassic	Daohugou Beds	China		A member of the family Gnetidae. The type species is D. sinensis.	
Dicranodontium minutum	Sp. nov	Valid	Hedenäs, Bomfleur & Friis in Bomfleur et al.	Early Cretaceous (Aptian–Albian)	Almargem Formation	Portugal		A moss, a species of Dicranodontium.	
Hanophyllum	Gen. et sp. nov		Barbacka et al.	Early Jurassic (Pliensbachian)		United States (Alaska)		A cycadophyte foliage. The type species is H. varioserratum.	
Kannaskoppianthus aasvoelensis	Sp. nov	Valid	Anderson & Anderson	Triassic	Molteno Formation	South Africa		A member of Ginkgoopsida belonging to the group Petriellales.	
Kannaskoppianthus komanthus	Sp. nov	Valid	Anderson & Anderson	Triassic	Molteno Formation	South Africa		A member of Ginkgoopsida belonging to the group Petriellales.	
Kannaskoppianthus switzianthus	Sp. nov	Valid	Anderson & Anderson	Triassic	Molteno Formation	South Africa		A member of Ginkgoopsida belonging to the group Petriellales.	
Kannaskoppianthus telepentatus	Sp. nov	Valid	Anderson & Anderson	Triassic	Molteno Formation	South Africa		A member of Ginkgoopsida belonging to the group Petriellales.	
Komlopteris artabeae	Comb. nov		(Herbst & Gnaedinger)	Early Jurassic	Nestares Formation	Argentina		A corystosperm. Moved from Alicurana artabei Herbst & Gnaedinger (2002).	
Komlopteris boolensis	Sp. nov		Slodownik, Hill & McLoughlin	Early Cretaceous (Valanginian–Barremian)	Rintoul Creek Formation	Australia		A corystosperm.	
Komlopteris constricta	Comb. nov		(Halle)	Late Jurassic (Oxfordian)	Upper Mount Flora Formation	Antarctica		A corystosperm. Moved from Thinnfeldia constricta Halle (1913).	
Komlopteris khatangiensis	Comb. nov		(Sengupta)	Late Jurassic or Early Cretaceous	Dubrajpur Formation	India		A corystosperm. Moved from Thinnfeldia khatangiensis Sengupta (1988).	
Komlopteris nestarensis	Comb. nov		(Herbst & Gnaedinger)	Early Jurassic	Nestares Formation	Argentina		A corystosperm. Moved from Alicurana nestarensis Herbst & Gnaedinger (2002).	
Komlopteris purlawaughensis	Sp. nov		Slodownik, Hill & McLoughlin	Late Jurassic	Purlawaugh Formation	Australia		A corystosperm.	
Komlopteris tiruchirapalliense	Comb. nov		(Sukh-Dev & Rajanikanth)	Early Cretaceous	Sivaganga Formation	India		A corystosperm. Moved from Sphenopteris tiruchirapalliense Sukh-Dev & Rajanikanth (1988).	
Komlopteris victoriensis	Sp. nov		Slodownik, Hill & McLoughlin	Early Cretaceous (Aptian)	Eumeralla Formation	Australia		A corystosperm.	
Mongolitria	Gen. et 2 sp. nov		Bickner et al.	Early Cretaceous		China; Mongolia		A gymnosperm seed. Genus includes M. friisae and M. exesum.	
Nebuloxyla	Gen. et sp. nov	Valid	Lalica & Tomescu	Devonian (Emsian)		Canada (Quebec)		An early euphyllophyte. Genus includes new species N. mikmaqiana.	
Pachytesta duquesnei	Sp. nov		Vallois & Nel	Carboniferous (Pennsylvanian)	Bruay Formation	France		A medullosalean "seed".	
Paradoxa	Gen. et sp. nov	Junior homonym	Liu, Shen & Wang	Middle Jurassic (Callovian)	Jiulongshan Formation	China		A gymnosperm with several morphological features formerly restricted to angiosperms. The type species is P. huangii. The generic name is preoccupied by Paradoxa Mattirolo (1935); Deshmukh (2026) coined a replacement name Neoparadoxa.	
Paraephedra	Gen. et sp. nov		Trajano et al.	Early Cretaceous	Serra do Tucano Formation	Brazil		Possibly a member of Ephedrales. Genus includes new species P. amazonensis.	
Perplexa	Gen. et sp. nov	Valid	Pfeiler & Tomescu	Devonian	Battery Point Formation	Canada (Quebec)		An early euphyllophyte. The type species is P. praestigians.	
Petalophyllites	Gen. et sp. nov	Valid	Hoffman & Crandall-Stotler	Paleocene	Paskapoo Formation	Canada (Alberta)		A liverwort belonging to the family Petalophyllaceae. The type species is P. speirsiae.	
Petrosjania	Gen. et sp. nov	Valid	Snigirevsky & Lyubarova	Devonian		Russia		A plant of uncertain affinities, with features characteristic of different groups of higher plants. The type species is P. salarina.	
Phasmatocycas mazongshanensis	Sp. nov		Li & Du in Li et al.	Early Cretaceous		China		A relative of Paleozoic primitive Cycadales.	
Phoenicopsis (Windwardia) ningxiaensis	Sp. nov	Valid	He in He et al.	Middle Jurassic	Yanan Formation	China		A member of Czekanowskiales.	
Physcidium	Gen. et 2 sp. nov	Valid	Hedenäs, Bomfleur & Friis in Bomfleur et al.	Early Cretaceous (Aptian–Albian)	Almargem Formation	Portugal		A moss belonging to the family Diphysciaceae. The type species is P. tortuosum; genus also includes P. simsimiae.	
Polytrichastrum incurvum	Sp. nov	Valid	Hedenäs, Bomfleur & Friis in Bomfleur et al.	Early Cretaceous (Aptian–Albian)	Almargem Formation	Portugal		A moss, a species of Polytrichastrum.	
Pterophyllum beishanensis	Sp. nov		Li & Du in Li et al.	Early Cretaceous	Tuomatan Formation	China			
Psilophyton diakanthon	Sp nov	in press	Colston, Landaw, & Tomescu	Devonian; Emsian	Battery Point Formation	Canada; Quebec		A trimerophytopsid land plant Bimodal spines suggest active levels of defense against herbivores	
Qingganninginfructus	Gen. et sp. nov		Wang & Sun in Han et al.	Middle Jurassic	Yaojie Formation	China		Possibly an early angiosperm. The type species is Q. formosa.	
Rhaphidopteris zhouii	Sp. nov	In press	Yang	Early Jurassic	Sangonghe Formation	China		A gymnosperm.	
Rochipteris distivena	Sp. nov	Valid	Anderson & Anderson	Triassic	Molteno Formation	South Africa		A member of Ginkgoopsida belonging to the group Petriellales.	
Rochipteris komifolia	Sp. nov	Valid	Anderson & Anderson	Triassic	Molteno Formation	South Africa		A member of Ginkgoopsida belonging to the group Petriellales.	
Rochipteris lutifolia	Sp. nov	Valid	Anderson & Anderson	Triassic	Molteno Formation	South Africa		A member of Ginkgoopsida belonging to the group Petriellales.	
Rochipteris matatifolia	Sp. nov	Valid	Anderson & Anderson	Triassic	Molteno Formation	South Africa		A member of Ginkgoopsida belonging to the group Petriellales.	
Rochipteris penensis	Sp. nov	Valid	Anderson & Anderson	Triassic	Molteno Formation	South Africa		A member of Ginkgoopsida belonging to the group Petriellales.	
Rochipteris switzifolia	Sp. nov	Valid	Anderson & Anderson	Triassic	Molteno Formation	South Africa		A member of Ginkgoopsida belonging to the group Petriellales.	
Rochipteris telefolia	Sp. nov	Valid	Anderson & Anderson	Triassic	Molteno Formation	South Africa		A member of Ginkgoopsida belonging to the group Petriellales.	
Skyttegaardia nagalingumiae	Sp. nov		Elgorriaga & Atkinson	Late Cretaceous (Campanian)	Holz Shale	United States (California)		A member of Cycadales belonging to the family Zamiaceae.	
Tregiovia	Gen. et sp. nov		Forte & Kustatscher	Permian (Kungurian)	Tregiovo Formation	Italy		A plant of uncertain affinities, with the closest resemblance to the seed fern Auritifolia anomala. The type species is T. furcata.	
Tricosta priapiana	Sp. nov	Valid	Blanco-Moreno et al.	Early Cretaceous (Valanginian)		Canada (British Columbia)		A moss belonging to the family Tricostaceae.	
Xenoxylon kazuoense	Sp. nov		Xie, Wang, Tian & Uhl in Xie et al.	Early Cretaceous (Aptian)	Jiufotang Formation	China		Fossil wood of a gymnosperm of uncertain affinities.	
Xenoxylon shehongense	Sp. nov		Xie, Wang & Tian in Xie et al.	Late Jurassic	Penglaizhen Formation	China			
Zirabia	Gen. et comb. nov		Elgorriaga & Atkinson	Early Jurassic	Shemshak Group	Iran		A member of Doyleales; a new genus for "Karkenia" cylindrica Schweitzer & Kirchner (1995).	

=== Other plant research ===
- A study on the evolutionary history of Marchantiopsida, as indicated by data from extant and fossil taxa, is published by Flores et al. (2023).
- Decombeix et al. (2023) document tyloses in Late Devonian Callixylon wood.
- A study on the anatomy and affinities of Tingia unita, based on data from specimens from the Permian Taiyuan Formation (China), is published by Yang, Wang & Wang (2023), who confirm that T. unita was a progymnosperm belonging to the group Noeggerathiales.
- A study on the phylogenetic relationships and evolutionary history of cycads, based on data from extant and fossil taxa, is published by Coiro et al. (2023).
- Evidence from nitrogen isotopic measurements from fossilized cycad leaves and ancestral state reconstructions, interpreted as indicating that symbiosis of with N_{2}-fixing cyanobacteria wasn't ancestral within cycads but rather arose independently in the lineages leading to living cycads during or after the Jurassic, is published by Kipp et al. (2023).
- Fu et al. (2023) report the presence of ovules enclosed within the ovaries of specimens of Nanjinganthus dendrostyla, and consider their findings to be consistent with the interpretation of Nanjinganthus as an Early Jurassic angiosperm.

== Palynology ==
Name	Novelty	Status	Authors	Age	Unit	Location	Synonymized taxa	Notes	Images
Acanthodiporites	Gen. et sp. nov		Parmar et al.	Paleogene		India		Pollen of a member of the family Arecaceae. Genus includes new species A. spinatus.	
Acylomurus silviae	Sp. nov		Perez Loinaze et al.	Late Cretaceous (Maastrichtian)	Chorrillo Formation	Argentina		A spore of uncertain affinities.	
Ailanthipites diminutus	Sp. nov		De Benedetti et al.	Cretaceous-Paleogene boundary	La Colonia Formation	Argentina			
Ailanthipites feruglioi	Sp. nov		De Benedetti et al.	Cretaceous-Paleogene boundary	La Colonia Formation	Argentina			
Ailanthipites hexagonalis	Sp. nov		De Benedetti et al.	Cretaceous-Paleogene boundary	La Colonia Formation	Argentina			
Alisporites libyaensis	Nom. nov	Valid	Gutierrez & Zavattieri	Permian and Triassic		Libya		A replacement name for Alisporites plicatus Kar, Kieser & Jain (1972).	
Aratrisporites circularis	Sp. nov	Valid	Gutierrez & Zavattieri	Middle Triassic	Quebrada de los Fósiles Formation	Argentina			
Arecipites botrus	Sp. nov		De Benedetti et al.	Cretaceous-Paleogene boundary	La Colonia Formation	Argentina			
Baculatisporites magnus	Sp. nov	Valid	Gutierrez & Zavattieri	Middle Triassic	Quebrada de los Fósiles Formation	Argentina			
Brevitriletes decorus	Comb. nov	Valid	(Ouyang & Norris)	Triassic		China		Moved from Anapiculatisporites decorus Ouyang & Norris (1999).	
Brevitriletes pamelae	Comb. nov	Valid	(Ottone in Ottone et al.)	Triassic		Argentina		Moved from Anapiculatisporites pamelae Ottone in Ottone et al. (1992).	
Brevitriletes sandrae	Comb. nov	Valid	(Ottone in Ottone et al.)	Triassic		Argentina		Moved from Anapiculatisporites sandrae Ottone in Ottone et al. (1992).	
Carnisporites microspinous	Sp. nov	Valid	Gutierrez & Zavattieri	Middle Triassic	Quebrada de los Fósiles Formation	Argentina			
Casuarinidites foveolatus	Sp. nov		Mander, Jaramillo & Oboh-Ikuenobe	Paleogene		Nigeria		Pollen of a flowering plant.	
Classopollis patagonicus	Sp. nov		De Benedetti et al.	Cretaceous-Paleogene boundary	La Colonia Formation	Argentina			
Clavapalmaedites clavatus	Sp. nov		Parmar et al.	Paleogene		India			
Clavatriporites	Gen. et 2 sp. nov		Mander, Jaramillo & Oboh-Ikuenobe	Paleogene		Nigeria		Pollen of a flowering plant. Genus includes new species C. dispersiclavatus and C. spicatus.	
Cuneatisporites cacheutensis	Comb. nov	Valid	(Jain)	Triassic	Cacheuta Formation	Argentina		Moved from Jansoniuspollenites cacheutensis Jain (1968).	
Cuneatisporites salujhai	Comb. nov	Valid	(Jain)	Triassic	Cacheuta Formation	Argentina		Moved from Jansoniuspollenites salujhai Jain (1968).	
Echitricolpites serratus	Sp. nov		Mander, Jaramillo & Oboh-Ikuenobe	Paleogene		Nigeria			
Ericipites verrucatus	Sp. nov		De Benedetti et al.	Cretaceous-Paleogene boundary	La Colonia Formation	Argentina			
Flabellisporites zhaotongensis	Sp. nov		Sui, McLoughlin & Feng in Sui et al.	Permian (Lopingian)	Xuanwei Formation	China		A spore of a member of Isoetales.	
Gemmamonocolpites barmerensis	Sp. nov		Parmar et al.	Paleogene		India			
Gemmamonocolpites chubutensis	Sp. nov		De Benedetti et al.	Cretaceous-Paleogene boundary	La Colonia Formation	Argentina			
Grimmipollis	Gen et sp nov		Huang, Morley, & Hoorn	late Eocene	Yaw Formation	Myanmar		A cupaniean sapindaceous pollen morphotype The type species is G. burmanica	
Henrisporites qujingensis	Sp. nov		Sui, McLoughlin & Feng in Sui et al.	Permian (Lopingian)	Xuanwei Formation	China		A lycopsid megaspore.	
Henrisporites yunnanensis	Sp. nov		Sui, McLoughlin & Feng in Sui et al.	Permian (Lopingian)	Xuanwei Formation	China		A lycopsid megaspore.	
Inaperturopollenites fossulatus	Sp. nov		Mander, Jaramillo & Oboh-Ikuenobe	Paleogene		Nigeria			
Krutzschipollis argentinum	Sp. nov		De Benedetti et al.	Cretaceous-Paleogene boundary	La Colonia Formation	Argentina			
Lagenicula morbelliae	Sp. nov		Quetglas, Di Pasquo & Macluf	Carboniferous (Tournaisian)	Toregua Formation	Bolivia			
Leschikisporis variabilis	Sp. nov	Valid	Gutierrez & Zavattieri	Middle Triassic	Quebrada de los Fósiles Formation	Argentina			
Liliacidites buitrensis	Sp. nov		De Benedetti et al.	Cretaceous-Paleogene boundary	La Colonia Formation	Argentina			
Liliacidites lacunosus	Sp. nov		De Benedetti et al.	Cretaceous-Paleogene boundary	La Colonia Formation	Argentina			
Limatulasporites rugulatus	Sp. nov	Valid	Gutierrez & Zavattieri	Middle Triassic	Quebrada de los Fósiles Formation	Argentina			
Longapertites crassireticuloides	Sp. nov		Mander, Jaramillo & Oboh-Ikuenobe	Paleogene		Nigeria		Pollen of a flowering plant.	
Luminidites microreticulatus	Sp. nov		Mander, Jaramillo & Oboh-Ikuenobe	Paleogene		Nigeria		Pollen of a flowering plant.	
Lusatisporis choiols	Sp. nov		Perez Loinaze et al.	Late Cretaceous (Maastrichtian)	Chorrillo Formation	Argentina		A spore of uncertain affinities.	
Nelumbopollenites patagonicus	Sp. nov		De Benedetti et al.	Cretaceous-Paleogene boundary	La Colonia Formation	Argentina		Pollen of a member of the family Nelumbonaceae.	
Neoraistrickia stricta	Sp. nov	Valid	Gutierrez & Zavattieri	Middle Triassic	Quebrada de los Fósiles Formation	Argentina			
Nyssapollenites scabratus	Sp. nov		De Benedetti et al.	Cretaceous-Paleogene boundary	La Colonia Formation	Argentina			
Parviprojectus archangelskyi	Sp. nov		De Benedetti et al.	Cretaceous-Paleogene boundary	La Colonia Formation	Argentina			
Periporopollenites delicatus	Sp. nov		De Benedetti et al.	Cretaceous-Paleogene boundary	La Colonia Formation	Argentina			
Pityosporites thoracatus	Comb. nov	Valid	(Balme)	Triassic		Pakistan		Moved from Pinuspollenites thoracatus Balme (1970).	
Podocarpidites rectangularis	Sp. nov		De Benedetti et al.	Cretaceous-Paleogene boundary	La Colonia Formation	Argentina			
Proteacidites baibianae	Sp. nov		De Benedetti et al.	Cretaceous-Paleogene boundary	La Colonia Formation	Argentina			
Proteacidites mirasolensis	Sp. nov		De Benedetti et al.	Cretaceous-Paleogene boundary	La Colonia Formation	Argentina			
Protohaploxypinus bonapartei	Sp. nov	Valid	Gutierrez & Zavattieri	Middle Triassic	Quebrada de los Fósiles Formation	Argentina			
Protohaploxypinus diazii	Sp. nov	Valid	Gutierrez & Zavattieri	Middle Triassic	Quebrada de los Fósiles Formation	Argentina			
Psilabrevitricolporites porolatus	Sp. nov		Mander, Jaramillo & Oboh-Ikuenobe	Paleogene		Nigeria		Pollen of a flowering plant.	
Psilatriletes brevilaesuratus	Sp. nov		Mander, Jaramillo & Oboh-Ikuenobe	Paleogene		Nigeria		A spore.	
Punctatisporites interfoveolatus	Sp. nov		Mander, Jaramillo & Oboh-Ikuenobe	Paleogene		Nigeria		A spore.	
Retimonocolpites perforatus	Sp. nov		Parmar et al.	Paleogene		India			
Retimonoporites heterobrochatus	Sp. nov		Mander, Jaramillo & Oboh-Ikuenobe	Paleogene		Nigeria		Pollen of a flowering plant.	
Retitrescolpites miriabilis	Sp. nov		Mander, Jaramillo & Oboh-Ikuenobe	Paleogene		Nigeria		Pollen of a flowering plant.	
Retitricolporites ganganensis	Sp. nov		De Benedetti et al.	Cretaceous-Paleogene boundary	La Colonia Formation	Argentina			
Retitricolporites irupensis	Sp. nov		De Benedetti et al.	Cretaceous-Paleogene boundary	La Colonia Formation	Argentina			
Retitriporites irregularis	Sp. nov		Mander, Jaramillo & Oboh-Ikuenobe	Paleogene		Nigeria			
Rousea robusta	Sp. nov		De Benedetti et al.	Cretaceous-Paleogene boundary	La Colonia Formation	Argentina			
Rugutricolporites cumulus	Sp. nov		Mander, Jaramillo & Oboh-Ikuenobe	Paleogene		Nigeria			
Slavicekia	Gen. et sp. nov	Valid	Heřmanová et al.	Late Cretaceous		Czech Republic		Pollen from the Normapolles complex, likely produced by angiosperms belonging to the order Fagales. Genus includes new species S. inaequalis.	
Sparganiaceaepollenites annulatus	Sp. nov		De Benedetti et al.	Cretaceous-Paleogene boundary	La Colonia Formation	Argentina			
Spinizonocolpites coloniensis	Sp. nov		De Benedetti et al.	Cretaceous-Paleogene boundary	La Colonia Formation	Argentina			
Spinizonocolpites variabilis	Sp. nov		De Benedetti et al.	Cretaceous-Paleogene boundary	La Colonia Formation	Argentina			
Symplocoipollenites microechinatus	Sp. nov		De Benedetti et al.	Cretaceous-Paleogene boundary	La Colonia Formation	Argentina			
Syncolporites angusticolpatus	Sp. nov		Mander, Jaramillo & Oboh-Ikuenobe	Paleogene		Nigeria			
Syncolporites rostro	Sp. nov		Mander, Jaramillo & Oboh-Ikuenobe	Paleogene		Nigeria			
Tetracolporopollenites torus	Sp. nov		Mander, Jaramillo & Oboh-Ikuenobe	Paleogene		Nigeria		Pollen of a flowering plant.	
Thomasospora	Gen. et comb. nov		Bek et al.	Paleozoic		France		Spores produced by the lycophyte Thomasites serratus. Genus includes "Lycospora" gigantea Alpern.	
Tricolpites brevicolpatus	Sp. nov		Mander, Jaramillo & Oboh-Ikuenobe	Paleogene		Nigeria			
Tricolpites multiornamentus	Sp. nov		Mander, Jaramillo & Oboh-Ikuenobe	Paleogene		Nigeria			
Tricolporites densus	Sp. nov		Mander, Jaramillo & Oboh-Ikuenobe	Paleogene		Nigeria			

=== Palynological research ===
- Vajda et al. (2023) interpret Ricciisporites tuberculatus as an aberrant pollen produced by Lepidopteris ottonis plants, and interpret its fossil record as indicative of the competitive success of plants which adopted the asexual reproductive strategy under stressed environmental conditions before and during the Triassic–Jurassic extinction event; their interpretation of Ricciisporites and Cycadopites as produced by the same plant is subsequently contested by Zavialova (2024) and reaffirmed by Vajda et al. (2024).
- A study on the vegetation in Central Africa from the middle Aptian to early Albian, as indicated by palynomorphs from the Doseo Basin in the Central African Rift system, is published by Dou et al. (2023), who identify two assemblages of spore and pollen fossils, and interpret the differences between the assemblages as indicative of a vegetation change related to change from relatively arid to humid climate.
- Malaikanok et al. (2023) describe fossil pollen grains of members of the family Fagaceae from the Oligocene to Miocene Ban Pa Kha Subbasin of the Li Basin (Thailand), and interpret the studied fossils as indicating that, contrary to previous interpretations of the palynological record, tropical Fagaceae-dominated forests existed in northern Thailand at least since the late Paleogene and persisted into the modern vegetation of Thailand.
- A study on the environmental changes in the Lake Baikal region during the Marine Isotope Stage 3, as indicated by palynological data, is published by Shichi et al. (2023), who find that the dispersal of Homo sapiens into Baikal Siberia coincided with climate changes resulting in warm and humid conditions and vegetation changes.
- Evidence from the study of Last Interglacial pollen records across Europe, interpreted as indicating that European forests before the arrival of Homo sapiens included substantial open and light woodland elements, is presented by Pearce et al. (2023).

== Research ==
- A study on the evolution of the phenotypic disparity of plants, based on data from extant and fossil taxa, is published by Clark et al. (2023), who find that the morphological distinctiveness of extant plant group is in part the result of extinction of fossil plants with intermediate morphologies, and report evidence of a pattern of episodic sharp increases of morphological diversity throughout the evolutionary history of plants.
- A study on the evolution of the complexity of vascular plant reproductive structures, indicating that major reproductive innovations were associated with increased integration through greater interactions among component parts, is published by Leslie & Mander (2023).
- Evidence from mercury concentration and isotopic signatures of marine sedimentary rock samples spanning from the Cambrian to Permian, interpreted as indicating that vascular plants were already widely distributed on land during the Ordovician-Silurian transition, is presented by Yuan et al. (2023).
- Evidence indicating that the knowledge of the early plant diversity from the latest Silurian–Early Devonian fossil record is at least partly affected by the variation of the rock record is presented by Capel et al. (2023).
- A study on early land plant diversity patterns across known paleogeographical units (Laurussia, Siberia, Kazakhstania, Gondwana) throughout the Silurian and Devonian periods is published by Capel et al. (2023)
- A study on the survivorship and migration dynamics of plants from the paleocontinent Angarida during the Frasnian-Tournaisian internal, as indicated by fossil record from the Siberian platform (Russia), is published by Dowding, Akulov & Mashchuk (2023).
- Barrón et al. (2023) study the floral assemblages from the Cretaceous Maestrazgo Basin (Spain), providing evidence of the existence of conifer woodlands and fern/angiosperm communities thriving in the mid-Cretaceous Iberian Desert System, and report that the studied assemblages can generally be related to others from Europe and North America, but also included plants that were typical for northern Gondwana.
- A study on the fossil material of plants from the Cenomanian deposits of the Western Desert (Egypt) is published by El Atfy et al. (2023), who report the presence of five main vegetation types, and interpret the studied fossils as indicative of an overall warm and humid climate, punctuated by repeated phases of drier conditions.
- Moreau & Néraudeau (2023) describe an assemblage of Cenomanian plants from a new paleontological site La Gripperie-Saint-Symphorien (Charente-Maritime, France), which (unlike most of Albian-Cenomanian coastal floras from the Aquitaine Basin) is dominated by angiosperms.
- A study on the mid-Eocene vegetation in the southern Central Andes, based on spore-pollen record from the Casa Grande Formation (Jujuy, Argentina), is published by Tapia et al. (2023), who interpret their findings as indicative of a plant community with no close analogue in the modern South American vegetation, as well as indicative of subtropical or tropical conditions and frost-free winters.
- Description of fossil wood from the Brown Sands and Flat Sands localities in the Pliocene Usno Formation (Lower Omo valley, Ethiopia) is published by Jolly-Saad & Bonnefille (2023), who report that the studied assemblages strongly differ from other Miocene and Pliocene wood assemblages from Ethiopia, and interpret them as indicative of a seasonal climate and more humid climatic conditions compared to the present, but also as indicative of instability of climatic and environmental conditions, with significant changes in the composition of the tree cover during the time of existence of Australopithecus afarensis.
- A study on changes in functional diversity of plants from southeast Australia during the last 12,000 years, inferred from long-term pollen records, is published by Adeleye et al. (2023).
- The oldest flower and seed fossils of the wind-pollinated besom heaths, Erica sect. Chlorocodon, were found in Madeira Island within a 1.3 million-year-old fossil deposit.
