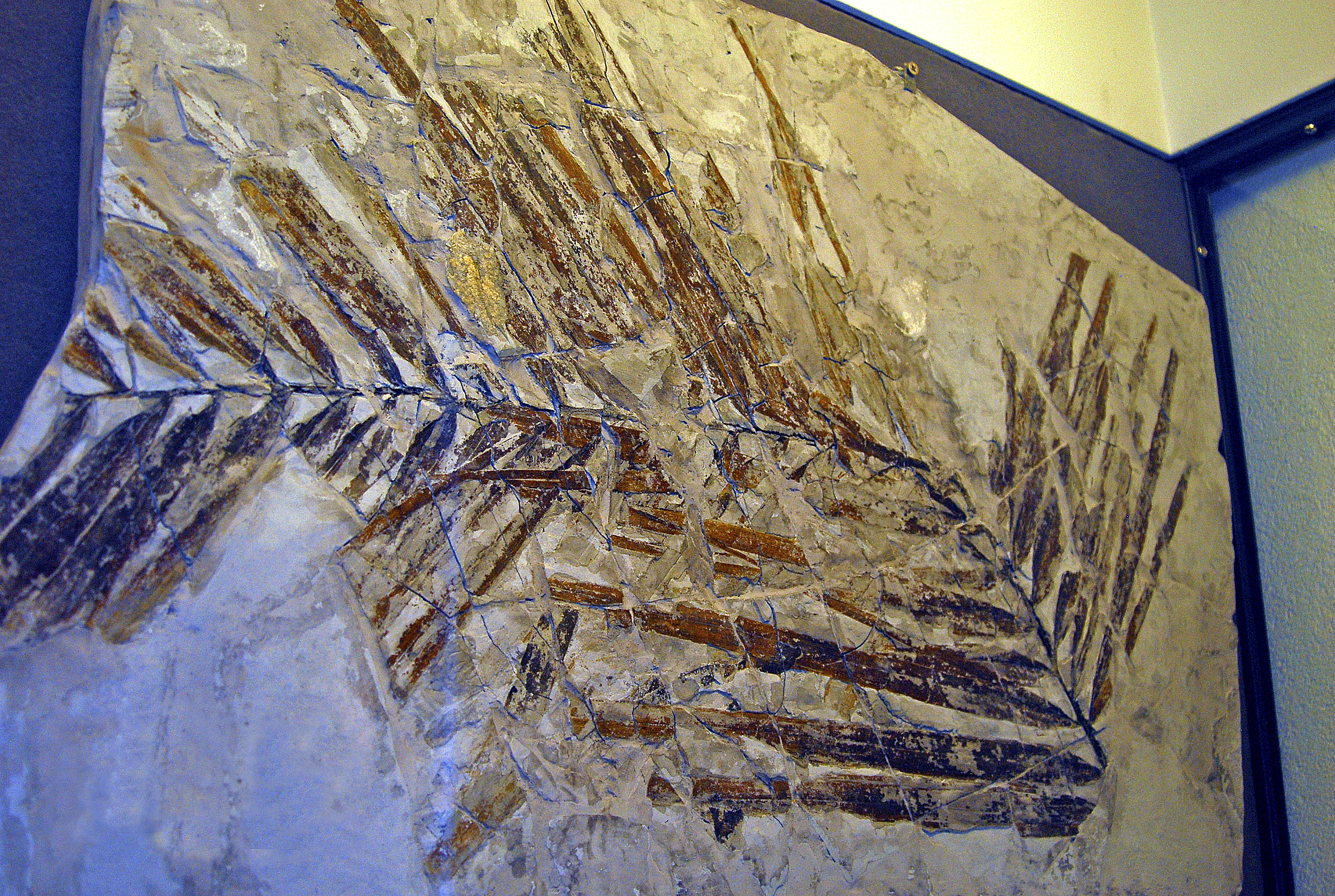
- Fossil of Phoenicites from Italy

Scientific classification
- Kingdom: Plantae
- Clade: Tracheophytes
- Clade: Angiosperms
- Clade: Monocots
- Clade: Commelinids
- Order: Arecales
- Family: Arecaceae
- Genus: †Phoenicites; Brongniart

= Phoenicites =

Phoenicites Temporal range: Cretaceous - Miocene

Extinct genus of palms

Phoenicites is a morphogenus for palm tree leaf fossils with a pinnate veination.

== Fossil record ==
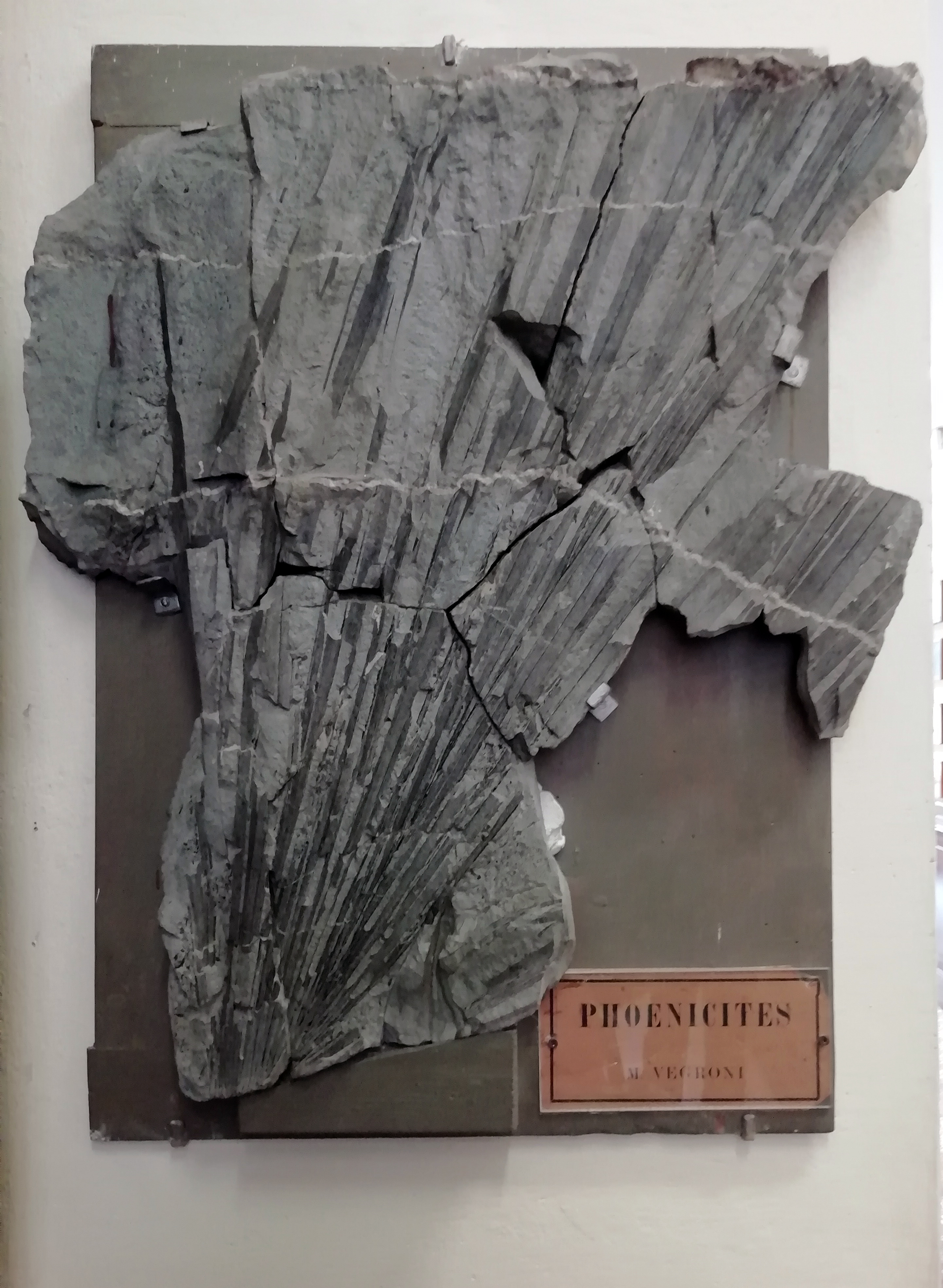
Fossil from the Vegroni mountain (collection of the Giovanni Capellini Geological Museum, in Italy

These fossils have been found in the Miocene of Switzerland, Oligocene of Germany, in the Cretaceous of United States (Age range: 70.6 to 5.332 Ma). and in the Vegroni mountain of Italy.

== Bibliography ==
- Fossilium Catalogus. II. Plantae. Pars 54
- A. T. Brongniart. 1828. Prodrome d'une histoire des végétaux fossiles.
- Edward Wilber Berry The Middle and Upper Eocene Floras of Southeastern North America
- Robert W. Read and Leo J. Hickey A Revised Classification of Fossil Palm and Palm-like Leaves Vol. 21, No. 1 (Feb., 1972), pp. 129–137 - International Association for Plant Taxonomy (IAPT) - DOI: 10.2307/1219237
- Emanuil Palamarev, Goran Kitanov, Krassimira Staneva, Vladimir Bozukov Fossil flora from Paleogene sediments in the northern area of the Mesta Graben in the Western Rhodopes. II. Analysis and stratigraphic importance of the flora
