= Karl J. Niklas =

American botanist

- Born: Karl Joseph Niklas; 1948 (age 77–78); New York City, U.S.
- Education: City College of New York (BS, 1970); University of Illinois Urbana Champaign (MS; Ph.D, 1974)
- Known for: Plant biomechanics; allometry; quantitative paleobotany
- Awards: Guggenheim Fellowship (1985) Humboldt Research Award (1998) BSA Centennial Medal (2006) Fellow, American Academy of Arts and Sciences (2015) Fellow, American Association for the Advancement of Science (2018)
- Scientific career
- Fields: Plant biology paleobotany biomechanics Allometry and scaling theory
- Workplaces: New York Botanical Garden (1974–1978) Cornell University (1978–2019; emeritus since 2019)
- Author abbrev. (botany): Niklas

Karl Joseph Niklas (born 1948) is an American botanist and paleobotanist. He is a Liberty Hyde Bailey Professor of Plant Biology Emeritus in the School of Integrative Plant Science at Cornell University, where he was a member of the faculty from 1978. His research applies physics, engineering and mathematics to plant form, function, and evolution, with particular attention to plant biomechanics and allometry. He is also known for quantitative studies of the plant fossil record.

== Education ==
Niklas earned his bachelor's degree at City College of New York. He earned his Ph.D. in paleobiology from the University of Illinois in 1974 and completed his post-doctoral research at Birkbeck College as a Fulbright-Hays Fellow.

== Career ==
After working as a curator at the New York Botanical Garden, Niklas joined the Cornell University faculty in 1978. He was promoted to full professor in 1985 and appointed Liberty Hyde Bailey Professor in 2000. Niklas served as president of the Botanical Society of America from 2008 to 2009 and as editor-in-chief of the American Journal of Botany from 1995 to 2004. He has published over 480 peer-reviewed papers and authored six books on plant biology topics. He was elected as a fellow of the American Academy of Arts and Sciences in 2015.

== Selected works ==
=== Books ===
- Plant Biomechanics, 1992 (ISBN 978-0226586311)
- Plant Allometry: The Scaling of Form and Process, 1994 (ISBN 978-0226580814)
- The Evolutionary Biology of Plants, 1997 (ISBN 978-0226580838)
- Plant Physics, 2012 (co-authored with Hanns-Christof Spatz) (ISBN 978-0226586328)
- Plant Evolution: An Introduction to the History of Life, 2016 (ISBN 978-0-226-34214-6)
- The Origins of Life: from Abiotic Chemistry to the first Cells. Karl J. Niklas, Thomas G. Owens, and Randy Wayne. 2025

== Awards and distinctions ==
- John Simon Guggenheim Fellowship
- The Botanical Society of America’s Centennial Medal
- Alexander von Humboldt Stiftung prize for senior USA scientists
- Elected Fellow, American Academy of Arts and Sciences
- Elected Fellow, American Association for the Advancement of Science
