= Otlaltepec Formation =

Geologic formation in Mexico

- Stratigraphic range: Middle Jurassic, Bathonian–Callovian
- Type: Geological formation
- Overlies: Piedra Hueca Formation
- Thickness: Typically at least 50 m (160 ft)

Lithology
- Primary: Sandstone

Location
- Coordinates: 18.4019°N 97.9086°W
- Country: Mexico
- Extent: Otlaltepec Basin

Type section
- Named for: Otlaltepec Basin

The Otlaltepec Formation is a Middle Jurassic (Bathonian Callovian) geologic formation located in Mexico. The unit is derived from rocks of Late Carboniferous or Early Permian age due to the presence of microscopic zircon crystals dating to around 312-280 Ma found in sandstone deposited within the formation, although the fossil content preserved in the formation dates it to the Middle Jurassic (Bathonian-Callovian). It overlies the Piedra Hueca Formation, which dates to no later than the Sinemurian (Early Jurassic).

Dinosaur remains pertaining to an indeterminate member of the Flagellicaudata, representing the first conclusive evidence of the occurrence of Flagellicaudata in this part of North America, are known from this formation. Brachyphyllum, Platycladium, Podocarpites, and Masculostrobus are identified from the formation.
