= Peruc–Korycany Formation =

Geologic formation in the Czech Republic

- Stratigraphic range: Cenomanian
- Type: Geological formation
- Sub-units: Peruc Member, Korycany Member
- Underlies: Bila Hora Formation
- Overlies: Metamorphic basement

Lithology
- Primary: Sandstone, Mudstone, Conglomerate

Location
- Country: Czech Republic
- Extent: Bohemian Cretaceous Basin

The Peruc–Korycany Formation is a geologic unit of Late Cretaceous age, located mostly in the Czech Republic. It is the oldest unit of the Bohemian Cretaceous Basin, which overlies Silurian-aged metamorphosed rocks of the Bohemian Massif. It consists of fluvial to shallow marine sediments.

== Fossil content ==
=== Dinosaurs ===
Dinosaur fossil remains about 94 million years old (Cenomanian stage) were found in 2003 near the village Mezholezy (Miskovice), by Kutná Hora. This small basal ornithopod dinosaur was officially named Burianosaurus augustai in 2017.

Dinosaurs
Genus	Species	Presence	Material	Notes	Images
Burianosaurus	B. augustai	Korycany Beds.	A well-preserved femur.	A basal ornithopod.	

=== Invertebrates ===
Invertebrates
Genus	Species	Presence	Material	Notes	Images
Novasalenia	N. plananyensis	Plaňany.		A saleniid sea urchin.	
Novasalenia	N. predbojensis	Předboj.		A saleniid sea urchin.	

=== Plants ===
Plants
Genus	Species	Presence	Material	Notes	Images
Elatocladus	E. velenovskyi	Environs of Peruc.	Twigs.	A conifer.	
Bayeritheca	B. hugesii		Pollen organ	An erdtmanithecale	
Papillaephyllum	P. labitae	Pecínov Quarry.	Leaves.	An angiosperm.	
Pecínovicladus	P. kvaceki	Pecínov Quarry.	18 branch specimens preserved as charcoal.	A ginkgoale.	
Pseudoasterophyllites	P. cretaceus	Lipenec, Pecínov Quarry, Hloubětín Brickpit & an abandoned brick pit in the eastern part of Prague.		A magnoliopsid.	
Pseudoctenis	P. babinensis	Pecínov Quarry.	Foliage.	A cycad.	
Zamites	Z. pateri	Pecínov Quarry.		A bennettitale.	
Zlatkocarpus	Z. brnikensis	Clay pit near Brnik.	Fruiting specimens.	An angiosperm.	
Zlatkocarpus	Z. pragensis	Hloubětín-Hutě, northeastern suburb of Prague.	Inflorescence axis, fruits and pollen.	An angiosperm.	
