= Normapolles =

Extinct angiosperm pollen group

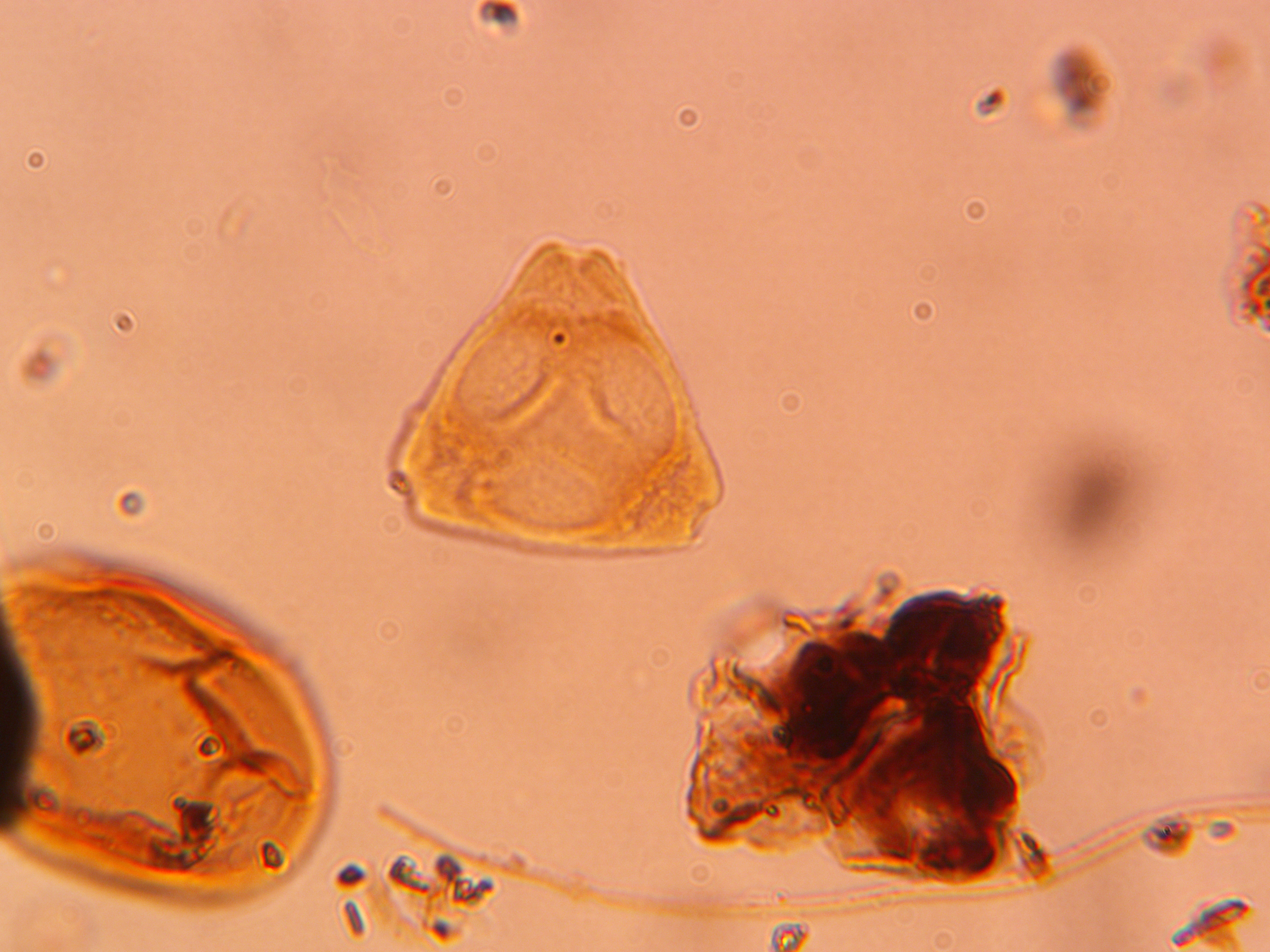
Osculapollis sp. F from the middle Late Cretaceous (Coniacian) Magothy Formation of Northern Delaware. Osculapollis was a common normapolles genus in North America during this time.

Normapolles is an extinct angiosperm pollen group that arose in the Cenomanian (Late Cretaceous). Normapolles persisted until the early Oligocene Epoch (Tertiary Period) but were reduced in diversity by the early Eocene Epoch. Normapolles were widespread in the Late Cretaceous of southern and eastern North America and Europe up to the West Siberian Plain between 56°N and 36°N, collectively referred to as the "Normapolles Province".

Normapolles is characterized by a triangular amb and an internally complex tricolpate pore structure with deep pore canals “oblate, mostly triporate or brevitricolp(or)ate pollen having complex, commonly protruding apertures and typically a triangular amb, although some are more or less circular in polar view.” Over 160 genera have been described as part of the Normapolles complex. Normapolles grains have been found inside fossilized flowers of the walnut family (Juglandaceae).
