= 2019 in paleobotany =

This article records new taxa of fossil plants that were described during the year 2019, as well as other significant discoveries and events related to paleobotany that occurred in 2019.

== Mosses ==
Name	Novelty	Status	Authors	Age	Type locality	Location	Notes	Images
Heinrichsiella	Gen. et sp. nov	Valid	Bippus et al.	Jurassic		Argentina	A moss, possibly related to the family Polytrichaceae or Timmiellaceae. Genus includes new species H. patagonica.	
Kulindobryum	Gen. et sp. nov	Valid	Ignatov in Mamontov & Ignatov	Middle or Late Jurassic	Ukureyskaya Formation	Russia (Zabaykalsky Krai)	A form genus of dispersed moss capsules. Genus includes new species K. taylorioides.	
Polycingulatisporites multiverrucata	Sp. nov	In press	Santamarina in Santamarina et al.	Late Cretaceous (Cenomanian)	Mata Amarilla Formation	Argentina	Spores of a member of Bryophyta of uncertain phylogenetic placement, possibly of sphagnaceous affinity. Announced in 2019; the final version was scheduled to be published in 2020.	
Sphagnum heinrichsii	Sp. nov	Valid	Ignatov et al.	Late Eocene	Rovno amber	Ukraine	A moss, a species of Sphagnum.	
Paleaethallus	Gen. et sp. nov	Valid	Mamontov, Katagiri & Borovich in Mamontov & Ignatov	Late Jurassic	Glushkovo Formation	Russia (Zabaykalsky Krai)	A thalloid bryophyte. Genus includes new species P. squarrosus.	

== Liverworts ==
Name	Novelty	Status	Authors	Age	Type locality	Location	Notes	Images
Khasurtythallus	Gen. et sp. nov	Valid	Mamontov in Mamontov & Ignatov	Early Cretaceous		Russia (Buryatia)	A Marchantiidae liverwort. The type species is K. monosolenioides.	
Ricciopsis sandaolingensis	Sp. nov	Valid	Li & Sun in Li et al.	Middle Jurassic	Xishanyao Formation	China	A Ricciaceae liverwort.	
Thallites yangcaogouensis	Sp. nov	Valid	Wang et al.	Late Triassic	Yangcaogou Formation	China	A plant of uncertain phylogenetic placement, probably a liverwort.	

== Ferns and fern allies ==
Name	Novelty	Status	Authors	Age	Type locality	Location	Notes	Images
Alloiopteris loecsei	Sp. nov	Valid	Pšenička et al.	Carboniferous (Moscovian)		Germany	A zygopterid fern.	
Annularia noronhai	Sp. nov	Valid	Correia et al.	Carboniferous (Gzhelian)	Douro Basin	Portugal	A member of the family Calamitaceae. Announced in 2019; the final version of the article naming it was published in 2021.	
Azolla keuja	Sp. nov	Valid	Jud, De Benedetti, Gandolfo & Hermsen	Paleocene (Danian)	Salamanca Formation	Argentina	A species of Azolla.	
Berendtiopteris	Gen. et comb. nov	Valid	Sadowski et al.	Eocene	Baltic amber	Europe (Baltic Sea region)	A plant of uncertain phylogenetic placement, probably a fern; a new genus for "Pecopteris" humboldtiana.	
Bifariusotheca	Gen. et sp. nov	Valid	X.H.Zhao ex Doweld	Late Permian	Longtan Formation	China	A marattialean fern. Genus includes new species B. notocathaysica Doweld.	
Bowmanites yongchangensis	Sp. nov	Valid	Sun et al.	Permian (Cisuralian)		China	A member of Sphenophyllales.	
Clavatisporites cenomaniana	Sp. nov	In press	Santamarina in Santamarina et al.	Late Cretaceous (Cenomanian)	Mata Amarilla Formation	Argentina	Spores of a member of Filicopsida of uncertain phylogenetic placement. Announced in 2019; the final version of the article naming it is scheduled to be published in 2020.	
Collarisporites minor	Sp. nov	In press	Santamarina in Santamarina et al.	Late Cretaceous (Cenomanian)	Mata Amarilla Formation	Argentina	Spores of a member of Filicopsida of uncertain phylogenetic placement. Announced in 2019; the final version of the article naming it is scheduled to be published in 2020.	
Cyathocarpus yongchangensis	Sp. nov	Valid	Sun & Sun in Sun et al.	Permian (Cisuralian)	Shanxi Formation	China	A fern related to Psaronius.	
Floratheca	Gen. et sp. nov	Valid	Lundgren et al.	Early Permian	Río Genoa Formation	Argentina	A member of Marattiales. Genus includes new species F. apokalyptika.	
Germera brousmicheae	Sp. nov	Valid	Álvarez-Vázquez	Carboniferous (Westphalian)		Canada	A member of Filicopsida.	
Hausmannia olaensis	Sp. nov	Valid	Golovneva & Grabovskiy	Late Cretaceous (Santonian–early Campanian)		Russia	A Dipteridaceae umbrella fern.	
Heinrichsia	Gen. et sp. nov	Valid	Regalado et al.	Cretaceous	Burmese amber	Myanmar	A fern belonging to the family Pteridaceae. Genus includes new species H. cheilanthoides.	
Kamatheca	Gen. et comb. nov	Valid	Doweld	Permian		Russia	A marattialean fern; a new genus for "Acitheca" gigantea Esaulova.	
Marsilea sprungerorum	Sp. nov	Valid	Hermsen	Eocene	Green River Formation; Parachute Creek Member	United States; Utah	A Marsilea species water fern.	
Neolobatannularia	Gen. et sp. nov	Valid	Sun & Li in Wang et al.	Late Triassic	Yangcaogou Formation	China	A member of Equisetales. Genus includes new species N. liaoningensis.	
Osmundastrum gvozdevae	Sp. nov	Valid	Bazhenova & Bazhenov	Middle Jurassic (Bathonian)		Russia (Kursk Oblast)	A species of Osmundastrum.	
Palaeosorum waipiata	Sp. nov	Valid	Kaulfuss et al.	Early Miocene		New Zealand	A member of the family Polypodiaceae.	
Phlebopteris kirchneri	Sp. nov	Valid	Barbacka & Kustatscher in Barbacka, Kustatscher & Bodor	Early Jurassic (Hettangian)	Mecsek Coal Formation	Hungary	A fern belonging to the family Matoniaceae.	
Plenasium xiei	Sp. nov	Valid	Cheng et al.	Cretaceous		China	A member of Osmundaceae. Announced in 2019; the final version of the article naming it was published in 2021.	
Polymorphopteris magdalenae	Sp. nov	Valid	R.H.Wagner ex Doweld	Late Carboniferous		Spain	A marattialean fern.	
Polymorphopteris wagneri	Sp. nov	Valid	Doweld	Late Carboniferous (Kasimovian)		Spain	A marattialean fern.	
Polypodiisporites serratus	Sp. nov	Valid	D'Apolito et al.	Pliocene–Pleistocene		Brazil	Fossil spore of a member of the family Polypodiaceae.	
Polypodiisporites timidus	Sp. nov	Valid	D'Apolito et al.	Pliocene–Pleistocene		Brazil	Fossil spore of a member of the family Polypodiaceae.	
Rinistachya	Gen. et sp. nov	Valid	Prestianni & Gess	Devonian (Famennian)	Witpoort Formation	South Africa	A member of Sphenophyllales. The type species is R. hilleri.	
Rothwellopteris	Gen. et sp. nov	Valid	He et al.	Late Permian	Xuanwei Formation	China	A fern belonging to the group Marattiales. Genus includes new species R. pecopteroides.	
Scolecopteris libera	Sp. nov	Valid	Li et al.	Permian (Asselian)	Taiyuan Formation	China	A marattialean fern	
Scolecopteris renaultii	Sp. nov	Valid	Doweld	Permian (Cisuralian)		France	A marattialean fern.	
Tiania resinus	Sp. nov	Valid	He & Wang	Permian (Lopingian)	Xuanwei Formation	China	A member of Osmundales belonging to the extinct family Guaireaceae.	

== Lycophytes ==
Name	Novelty	Status	Authors	Age	Type locality	Location	Notes	Images
Bergeria wenquanensis	Sp. nov	Valid	Feng, D'Rozario & Zhang	Carboniferous (Viséan)	Akeshake Formation	China	A member of Lepidodendrales belonging to the family Flemingitaceae.	
Guangdedendron	Gen. et sp. nov		Wang et al.	Devonian (Famennian)	Wutong Formation	China	A member of Isoetales belonging to the group Dichostrobiles. Genus includes new species G. micrum.	
Omphalophloios wagneri	Sp. nov	Valid	Opluštil, Pšenička & Bek	Carboniferous (Moscovian)	Illinois Basin	United States (Indiana)		
Sawdonia hippotheca	Sp. nov	Valid	Berry & Gensel	Devonian (probably late Givetian)	Campo Chico Formation	Venezuela	A member of Zosterophyllopsida.	

== Conifers ==
=== Araucariaceae ===
Name	Novelty	Status	Authors	Age	Type locality	Location	Notes	Images
Agathoxylon gilii	Sp. nov	Valid	Ríos-Santos & Cevallos-Ferriz	Late Jurassic	Todos Santos Formation	Mexico		
Agathoxylon hoodii	Comb nov	valid	(Tidwell & Medlyn) Gee et al	Late Jurassic	Morrison Formation	USA; Utah	An araucariaceous petrified wood. Moved from Araucarioxylon hoodii (1993)	
Agathoxylon jericonse	Sp. nov	Valid	Ríos-Santos & Cevallos-Ferriz	Late Jurassic	Todos Santos Formation	Mexico		
Agathoxylon kotaense	Sp. nov	In press	Chinnappa, Rajanikanth & Pauline Sabina	?Late Jurassic – Early Cretaceous	Kota Formation	India	A member of the family Araucariaceae.	
Agathoxylon parrensis	Sp. nov	Valid	Ríos-Santos & Cevallos-Ferriz	Paleocene	Las Encinas Formation	Mexico		
Araucaria balfourensis	Sp. nov	Valid	Hill et al.	Cenozoic		Australia	A species of Araucaria.	
Araucaria macrophylla	Sp. nov	Valid	Hill et al.	Cenozoic		Australia	A species of Araucaria.	
Araucaria mollifolia	Sp. nov	Valid	Hill et al.	Cenozoic		Australia	A species of Araucaria.	
Araucaria rothwellii	Sp. nov	Valid	Kvaček in Kvaček et al.	Late Cretaceous (Campanian-Maastrichtian)	Bozova Formation	Turkey	A species of Araucaria.	
Brachyphyllum garciarum	Sp. nov	Valid	Carrizo et al.	Early Cretaceous (early Hauterivian/early Barremian)	Springhill Formation	Argentina	Probably a member of the family Araucariaceae.	

=== Cupressaceae ===
Name	Novelty	Status	Authors	Age	Type locality	Location	Notes	Images
Austrocupressinoxylon	Gen. et sp. nov	Valid	Nunes et al.	Early Cretaceous		Argentina	A member of Cupressaceae. Genus includes new species A. barcinense.	
Austrohamia asfaltensis	Sp. nov	Valid	Contreras et al.	Early Jurassic	Cañadón Asfalto Formation	Argentina	A member of the family Cupressaceae.	
Callitris blackburnii	Sp. nov	Valid	Paull et al.	Middle Miocene		Australia	A species of Callitris.	
Cupressinoxylon pliocenica	Sp. nov	Valid	Akkemik	Pliocene	Örencik Formation	Turkey	A member of the family Cupressaceae described on the basis of fossil wood.	
Mesocyparis sinica	Sp. nov	Valid	Cui et al.	Paleocene (Danian)	Wuyun Formation	China	A member of the family Cupressaceae.	
Protaxodioxylon sahnii	Sp. nov	Valid	Chinnappa, Kavali & Rajanikanth	Late Jurassic to Early Cretaceous	Kota Formation	India	A member of Cupressaceae, possibly related to Taxodium.	
Protodammara reimatamoriori	Sp. nov	Valid	Mays & Cantrill	Late Cretaceous (Cenomanian)	Tupuangi Formation	New Zealand	A member of Cupressaceae.	
Taxodioxylon cabullensis	Sp. nov	Valid	Ríos-Santos & Cevallos-Ferriz	Late Cretaceous	Packard Formation	Mexico	A cupressaceous fossil wood.	
Taxodium viligense	Sp. nov	Valid	Golovneva	Late Cretaceous (Coniacian)	Chingandzha Formation	Russia	A species of Taxodium.	

=== Pinceae ===
Name	Novelty	Status	Authors	Age	Type locality	Location	Notes	Images
Abies cuitlahuacii	Sp. nov	Valid	Cevallos-Ferriz, Ríos-Santos & Lozano-García	Pleistocene		Mexico	A fir.	
Pinus plioarmandii	Sp. nov	Valid	An et al.	Pliocene		China	A pine.	
Pinuxylon alonissianum	Sp. nov	Valid	Mantzouka & Sakala in Mantzouka et al.	Early Miocene		Greece	A member of the family Pinaceae described on the basis of fossil wood.	
Schizolepidopsis borealis	Sp. nov	Valid	Domogatskaya & Herman	Early Cretaceous (Albian)	Balyktakh Formation	Russia	A member of the family Pinaceae.	

=== Podocarpaceae ===
Name	Novelty	Status	Authors	Age	Type locality	Location	Notes	Images
Dacrycarpus guipingensis	Sp. nov	Valid	Wu et al.	Miocene	Erzitang Formation	China	A species of Dacrycarpus. Announced in 2019; the final version of the article naming it was published in 2021.	
Kirketapel	Gen. et sp. nov	Valid	Andruchow-Colombo et al.	Paleocene (early Danian)	Salamanca Formation	Argentina	A member of the family Podocarpaceae. The type species is K. salamanquensis.	
Podocarpus pliomacrophyllus	Sp. nov	In press	Chen et al.	Early Pliocene		China	A species of Podocarpus. Announced in 2019; the final version of the article naming it is not published yet.	

=== Other conifers ===
Name	Novelty	Status	Authors	Age	Type locality	Location	Notes	Images
Cephalotaxus maguanensis	Sp. nov	Valid	Zhang et al.	Middle Miocene		China	A species of Cephalotaxus.	
Cupressinocladus shelikhovii	Sp. nov	Valid	Golovneva	Late Cretaceous (Coniacian)	Chingandzha Formation	Russia	A cheirolepidiaceous species	
Frenelopsis justae	Sp. nov	Valid	Barral et al.	Early Cretaceous (Albian)	Escucha Formation	Spain	A member of the family Cheirolepidiaceae.	
Ningxiaites shitanjingensis	Sp. nov	Valid	Wei et al.	Permian (Changhsingian)	Sunjiagou Formation	China	A conifer wood.	
Protocupressinoxylon carrizalense	Sp. nov	Valid	Correa et al.	Late Triassic	Carrizal Formation	Argentina		

== Other seed plants ==
Name	Novelty	Status	Authors	Age	Type locality	Location	Notes	Images
Amyelon bogdense	Sp. nov	Valid	Wan, Yang & Wang	Late Permian or Early Triassic	Guodikeng Formation	China	A silicified gymnospermous root.	
Arazedispermum	Gen. et sp. nov	Valid	Friis, Crane & Pedersen	Early Cretaceous (late Aptian-early Albian)	Figueira da Foz Formation	Portugal	A seed plant belonging to the informal grouping Bennettitales-Erdtmanithecales-Gnetales. Genus includes new species A. lustanicum.	
Axsmithia	Gen. et comb. nov	Valid	Anderson et al.	Triassic		Antarctica	A seed fern. Genus includes "Umkomasia" uniramia Axsmith et al. (2000).	
Bowenia johnsonii	Sp. nov	Valid	Hill et al.	Early Eocene		Australia	A cycad, a species of Bowenia.	
Brinkia	Gen. et 2 sp. nov	Valid	Kustatscher, Visscher & van Konijnenburg-van Cittert	Permian (Lopingian)	Bellerophon Formation; Gröden/Val Gardena Sandstone	Italy	A possible member of Czekanowskiales. Genus includes new species B. kerpiana and B. cortianensis.	
Cordaabaxicutis jacobii	Sp. nov	Valid	Šimůnek	Carboniferous (Pennsylvanian)		Czech Republic	A member of Cordaitales.	
Cordaadaxicutis detmarovicensis	Sp. nov	Valid	Šimůnek	Carboniferous (Pennsylvanian)		Czech Republic	A member of Cordaitales.	
Cordaadaxicutis doubravensis	Sp. nov	Valid	Šimůnek	Carboniferous (Pennsylvanian)		Czech Republic	A member of Cordaitales.	
Cordaadaxicutis jaroslavii	Sp. nov	Valid	Šimůnek	Carboniferous (Pennsylvanian)		Czech Republic	A member of Cordaitales.	
Cordaadaxicutis orlovensis	Sp. nov	Valid	Šimůnek	Carboniferous (Pennsylvanian)		Czech Republic	A member of Cordaitales.	
Cryptokerpia	Gen. et sp. nov	Valid	Blomenkemper, Abu Hamad & Bomfleur	Late Permian	Umm Irna Formation	Jordan	An enigmatic type of gymnosperm leaf. Genus includes new species C. sarlaccophora.	
Douropteris	Gen. et sp. nov	Valid	Correia et al.	Carboniferous (Gzhelian)	Douro Basin	Portugal	A seed fern belonging to the group Medullosales. Genus includes new species D. alvarezii.	
Ephedrispermum tenuicostatum	Sp. nov	Valid	Friis, Crane & Pedersen	Early Cretaceous (Aptian or early Albian)		Portugal	A seed plant belonging to the informal grouping Bennettitales-Erdtmanithecales-Gnetales.	
Geminispermum	Gen. et sp. nov	Valid	Friis, Crane & Pedersen	Early Cretaceous (Albian)	Potomac Group	United States (Virginia)	A seed plant belonging to the informal grouping Caytoniales-Umkomasiales-Petriellales. Genus includes new species G. virginiense.	
Glossopteris thirroulensis	Sp. nov	Valid	McLoughlin & Mays in McLoughlin, Maksimenko & Mays	Permian (Wuchiapingian)	Wilton Formation	Australia		
Hirsutisperma	Gen. et sp. nov	Valid	Scott et al.	Carboniferous (Viséan)		United Kingdom	An ovule adapted for wind dispersal and for deterring herbivory. Genus includes new species H. rothwellii.	
Huncocladus	Gen. et sp. nov	Valid	Andruchow-Colombo, Wilf & Escapa	Early Eocene	La Huitrera Formation	Argentina	A seed plant of uncertain phylogenetic placement. Originally described as a member of the family Podocarpaceae related to the genus Phyllocladus; on the other hand, Dörken et al. (2021) rejected the podocarpaceous affinity of Huncocladus, and considered it to be more closely related to the cycad genera Bowenia or Eobowenia. Genus includes new species H. laubenfelsii.	
Illawarraspermum	Gen. et sp. nov	Valid	McLoughlin & Mays in McLoughlin, Maksimenko & Mays	Permian (Wuchiapingian)	Wilton Formation	Australia	A glossopterid seed. Genus includes new species I. ovatum.	
Kirchmuellia	Gen. et comb. nov	Valid	Anderson et al.	Early Jurassic		Germany	A seed fern. Genus includes "Umkomasia" franconica Kirchner & Müller (1992).	
Lepidopteris scassoi	Sp. nov	Valid	Elgorriaga, Escapa & Cúneo	Early Jurassic	Cañadón Asfalto Formation	Argentina		
Lignieriopsis	Gen. et 2 sp. nov	Valid	Friis, Crane & Pedersen	Early Cretaceous (late Aptian-Albian)	Figueira da Foz Formation; Potomac Group	Portugal; United States (Virginia)	A seed plant belonging to the informal grouping Bennettitales-Erdtmanithecales-Gnetales. Genus includes new species L. stenosperma and L. parva.	
Mariopteris hexiensis	Sp. nov	Valid	Wang et al.	Permian (Cisuralian)	Shanxi Formation	China	Announced in 2019; the final version of the article naming it was published in 2021.	
Mariopteris yongchangensis	Sp. nov	Valid	Wang et al.	Permian (Cisuralian)	Shanxi Formation	China	Announced in 2019; the final version of the article naming it was published in 2021.	
Muelkirchium	Gen. et comb. nov	Valid	Anderson et al.	Early Jurassic		Germany	A seed fern. Genus includes "Pteruchus" septentrionalis Kirchner & Müller (1992).	
Mutoviaspermum	Gen. et sp. nov	Valid	Karasev et al.	Permian (Lopingian)	Poldarsa Formation	Russia (Vologda Oblast)	A member of Voltziales. Genus includes new species M. krassilovii.	
Noeggerathiopsis brasiliensis	Nom. nov	Valid	Degani-Schmidt & Guerra-Sommer	Early Permian	Rio Bonito Formation	Brazil	A member of Cordaitales; a replacement name for Rufloria gondwanensis Guerra-Sommer (1989).	
Potoniea krisiae	Sp. nov	Valid	Pšenička, Zodrow & Bek	Carboniferous (Moscovian)	Sydney Coalfield	Canada (Nova Scotia)	Reproductive male organ of a seed fern, possibly a member of the family Parispermaceae.	
Protophyllocladoxylon zhaobishanensis	Sp. nov	Valid	Wan, Yang & Wang	Early Triassic (Induan)	Jiucaiyuan Formation	China	A silicified gymnospermous fossil wood.	
Pseudotorellia yimaensis	Sp. nov	Valid	Dong et al.	Middle Jurassic	Yima Formation	China		
Ptilophyllum eminelidarum	Sp. nov	Valid	Carrizo, Lafuente Diaz & Del Fueyo	Early Cretaceous	Springhill Formation	Argentina	A member of Bennettitales.	
Ptilophyllum micropapillosum	Sp. nov	Valid	Lafuente Diaz et al.	Early Cretaceous	Springhill Formation	Argentina	A member of Bennettitales.	
Rothwellia	Gen. et sp. nov	Valid	Friis, Crane & Pedersen	Early Cretaceous (Albian)	Potomac Group	United States (Virginia)	A seed plant belonging to the informal grouping Bennettitales-Erdtmanithecales-Gnetales. Genus includes new species R. foveata.	
Sagenopteris trapialensis	Sp. nov	Valid	Elgorriaga, Escapa & Cúneo	Early Jurassic	Lonco Trapial Formation	Argentina	A member of Caytoniales.	
Sclerospiroxylon xinjiangensis	Sp. nov	Valid	Wan, Yang & Wang	Permian (Kungurian)	Hongyanchi Formation	China		
Sueria laxinervis	Sp. nov	Valid	Yamada & Nishida in Yamada et al.	Late Cretaceous (Maastrichtian)	Quiriquina Formation	Chile	A cycad.	
Thodaya	Gen. et sp. nov	Junior homonym	Friis, Crane & Pedersen	Early Cretaceous (Albian)	Potomac Group	United States (Virginia)	A seed plant belonging to the informal grouping Bennettitales-Erdtmanithecales-Gnetales. Genus includes new species T. sykesiae. The generic name is preoccupied by Thodaya Compton; Deshmukh (2026) coined a replacement name Marythodaya.	
Umaltolepis yimaensis	Sp. nov	Valid	Dong et al.	Middle Jurassic	Yima Formation	China		
Umkomasia corniculata	Sp. nov	Valid	Shi et al.	Early Cretaceous (Aptian–Albian)		Mongolia		
Umkomasia trilobata	Sp. nov	Valid	Shi et al.	Early Cretaceous (Aptian–Albian)		Mongolia		
Wangjunia	Gen. et sp. nov	Valid	Backer, Bomfleur & Kerp	Permian (Guadalupian)	Lower Shihhotse Formation	China	A member of Cordaitales. Genus includes new species W. microphylla.	
Xuanweioxylon damogouense	Sp. nov	Valid	Yang et al.	Permian (Lopingian)	Xuanwei Formation	China	A conifer stem.	
Zhangwuia	Gen. et sp. nov	Valid	Liu, Hou & Wang	Middle Jurassic (Callovian)	Jiulongshan Formation	China	A reproductive organ of a seed plant of uncertain phylogenetic placement. Genus includes new species Z. mira.	

== Flowering plants ==
=== Basal angiosperms ===
==== Nymphaeales ====
Name	Novelty	Status	Authors	Age	Type locality	Location	Notes	Images
Nuphaea	Gen. et sp. nov	Valid	Gee & Taylor	Eocene	Messel pit	Germany	A member of Nymphaeaceae. Genus includes new species N. engelhardtii.	

==== Other basal angiosperms ====
Name	Novelty	Status	Authors	Age	Type locality	Location	Notes	Images
Anaspermum	Gen. et sp. nov	Valid	Friis, Crane & Pedersen	Early Cretaceous (late Barremian-early Aptian)	Almargem Formation	Portugal	A flowering plant with affinities to Austrobaileyales or Nymphaeales. Genus includes new species A. operculatum.	
Gastonispermum antiquum	Sp. nov	Valid	Friis, Crane & Pedersen	Early Cretaceous (late Barremian-early Aptian)	Almargem Formation	Portugal	A flowering plant with affinities to Austrobaileyales or Nymphaeales.	

=== Monocots ===
==== Alismatales ====
Name	Novelty	Status	Authors	Age	Type locality	Location	Notes	Images
Natantisphyllum	Gen. et sp. nov	Valid	Puebla, Vento & Prámparo	Late Cretaceous		Argentina	A member of the family Araceae. Genus includes new species N. crenae. Announced in 2019; the final version of the article naming it was published in 2021.	
Orontiophyllum ferreri	Sp. nov	Valid	Sender et al.	Early Cretaceous (Albian)		Spain	A member or a relative of the family Araceae.	
Turolospadix	Gen. et sp. nov	Valid	Sender et al.	Early Cretaceous (Albian)		Spain	A member or a relative of the family Araceae. Genus includes new species T. bogneri.	

==== Arecales ====
Name	Novelty	Status	Authors	Age	Type locality	Location	Notes	Images
Palmoxylon deoriensis	Sp. nov	Valid	Khan, Mandal & Bera	Late Cretaceous (late Maastrichtian) – early Paleocene (Danian)	Deccan Intertrappean Beds	India	A permineralized palm stem.	
Sabalites tibetensis	Sp. nov	Valid	Su & Zhou in Su et al.	Oligocene (Chattian)	Lunpola Basin	China	A member of the family Arecaceae belonging to the subfamily Coryphoideae.	
Sclerosperma protoprofizianum	Sp. nov	Valid	Grímsson & Zetter in Grímsson et al.	Late Oligocene		Ethiopia	A species of Sclerosperma.	
Sclerosperma protomannii	Sp. nov	Valid	Grímsson & Zetter in Grímsson et al.	Late Oligocene		Ethiopia	A species of Sclerosperma.	
Spinopalmoxylon cicatricosum	Sp. nov	Valid	Winterscheid	Oligocene	Köln Formation	Germany	A member of the family Arecaceae belonging to the tribe Calameae.	
Spinopalmoxylon parvifructum	Sp. nov	Valid	Winterscheid	Oligocene	Köln Formation	Germany	A member of the family Arecaceae belonging to the tribe Calameae.	
Spinizonocolpites riochiquensis	Sp. nov	Valid	Vallati & De Sosa Tomas in Vallati, De Sosa Tomas & Casal	Late Cretaceous (Maastrichtian)	Lago Colhué Huapí Formation	Argentina	A member of Arecaceae described on the basis of fossil pollen grains. Announced in 2019; the final version of the article naming it was published in 2020.	

==== Dioscoreales ====
Name	Novelty	Status	Authors	Age	Type locality	Location	Notes	Images
Dioscorea eocenicus	Sp. nov	Valid	Mehrotra & Shukla	Early Eocene		India	A species of Dioscorea.	
Dioscorea manchesteri	Sp. nov	Valid	Kvaček	Miocene	Most Formation	Czech Republic	A species of Dioscorea.	

==== Poales ====
Name	Novelty	Status	Authors	Age	Type locality	Location	Notes	Images
Bambusiculmus makumensis	Sp. nov	Valid	Srivastava et al.	Late Oligocene		India	A bamboo.	
Bambusiculmus tirapensis	Sp. nov	Valid	Srivastava et al.	Late Oligocene		India	A bamboo.	
Bambusium arunachalense	Sp. nov	Valid	Srivastava et al.	Late Miocene to Pliocene		India	A bamboo.	
Bambusium deomarense	Sp. nov	Valid	Srivastava et al.	Late Miocene to Pliocene		India	A bamboo.	
Scirpus weichangensis	Sp. nov	Valid	Liang in Lu et al.	Early Miocene	Hannuoba Formation	China	A species of Scirpus.	

=== Magnoliids ===
==== Laurales ====
Name	Novelty	Status	Authors	Age	Type locality	Location	Notes	Images
Cinnamomum raptiensis	Sp. nov	Valid	Prasad et al.	Middle Miocene	Lower Churia Group	Nepal	A species of Cinnamomum.	
Laurinoxylon acalensis	Sp. nov	Valid	Pérez-Lara, Estrada-Ruiz & Castañeda-Posadas	Eocene	El Bosque Formation	Mexico	A member of Lauraceae.	
Laurinoxylon thomasii	Sp. nov	Valid	Akkemik in Akkemik, Akkılıç & Güngör	Early Miocene		Turkey		
Laurophyllum alseodaphnoides	Sp. nov	Valid	Wang & Sun in Wang et al.	Miocene (Langhian)	Fotan Group	China	A member of Lauraceae described on the basis of fossil leaves.	
Laurophyllum fotanensis	Sp. nov	Valid	Wang & Sun in Wang et al.	Miocene (Langhian)	Fotan Group	China	A member of Lauraceae described on the basis of fossil leaves.	
Laurophyllum lindaiensis	Sp. nov	Valid	Wang & Sun in Wang et al.	Miocene (Langhian)	Fotan Group	China	A member of Lauraceae described on the basis of fossil leaves.	
Laurophyllum triangulatum	Sp. nov	Valid	Wang & Sun in Wang et al.	Miocene (Langhian)	Fotan Group	China	A member of Lauraceae described on the basis of fossil leaves.	
Laurophyllum zhangpuensis	Sp. nov	Valid	Wang & Sun in Wang et al.	Miocene (Langhian)	Fotan Group	China	A member of Lauraceae described on the basis of fossil leaves.	
Mezilaurinoxylon oleiferum	Sp. nov	Valid	Ruiz, Brea & Pujana in Ruiz et al.	Paleocene (Danian)	Salamanca Formation	Argentina	A member of the family Lauraceae. Announced in 2019; the final version of the article naming it is scheduled to be published in 2020.	
Patagonoxylon	Gen. et sp. nov	Valid	Ruiz, Brea & Pujana in Ruiz et al.	Paleocene (Danian)	Salamanca Formation	Argentina	A Lauralean of uncertain phylogenetic placement. The type species is P. scalariforme. Announced in 2019; the final version of the article naming it is scheduled to be published in 2020.	
Persea masotkholaensis	Sp. nov	Valid	Prasad et al.	Middle Miocene	Lower Churia Group	Nepal	A species of Persea.	

==== Magnoliales ====
Name	Novelty	Status	Authors	Age	Type locality	Location	Notes	Images
Anaxagorea mioluzonensis	Sp. nov	Valid	Prasad et al.	Late Miocene	Middle Churia Group	Nepal	A species of Anaxagorea.	
Anonaspermum orientalis	Sp. nov	Valid	Li et al.	Late Oligocene	Yongning Formation	China	A member of the family Annonaceae.	
Mitrephora mioreticulata	Sp. nov	Valid	Prasad et al.	Late Miocene	Middle Churia Group	Nepal	A species of Mitrephora.	
Riaselis	Gen. et sp. nov	Valid	Friis, Crane & Pedersen	Early Cretaceous (late Aptian-early Albian or older)		Portugal	Genus includes new species R. rugosa.	
Serialis	Gen. et 9 sp. nov	Valid	Friis, Crane & Pedersen	Early Cretaceous (late Barremian-early Albian)	Almargem Formation; Figueira da Foz Formation	Portugal	Genus includes new species S. antiqua, S. parva, S. elongata, S. tenuitesta, S. communis, S. crassitesta, S. grossa, S. undata and S. reticulata.	
Uvaria miolucida	Sp. nov	Valid	Prasad et al.	Late Miocene	Middle Churia Group	Nepal	A species of Uvaria.	

==== Piperales ====
Name	Novelty	Status	Authors	Age	Type locality	Location	Notes	Images
Appofructus	Gen. et sp. nov	Valid	Friis, Crane & Pedersen	Early Cretaceous (late Barremian-early Aptian)	Almargem Formation	Portugal	Genus includes new species A. nudus.	
Appomattoxia minuta	Sp. nov	Valid	Friis, Crane & Pedersen	Early Cretaceous (late Barremian-early Aptian)	Almargem Formation	Portugal		
Burgeria	Gen. et sp. nov	Valid	Friis, Crane & Pedersen	Early Cretaceous (late Barremian-early Aptian)	Almargem Formation	Portugal	Genus includes new species B. striata.	
Dejaxia	Gen. et sp. nov	Valid	Friis, Crane & Pedersen	Early Cretaceous (late Barremian-early Aptian)	Almargem Formation	Portugal	Genus includes new species D. brevicolpites.	
Goczania	Gen. et 3 sp. nov	Valid	Friis, Crane & Pedersen	Early Cretaceous (late Barremian-early Aptian)	Almargem Formation	Portugal	Genus includes new species G. rugosa, G. inaequalis and G. punctata.	

=== Unplaced non-eudicots ===
==== Chloranthales ====
Name	Novelty	Status	Authors	Age	Type locality	Location	Notes	Images
Canrightia elongata	Sp. nov	Valid	Friis, Crane & Pedersen	Early Cretaceous (late Barremian-early Aptian)	Almargem Formation	Portugal		
Hedyflora	Gen. et sp. nov	Valid	Friis, Crane & Pedersen	Early Cretaceous (late Aptian–early Albian)	Figueira da Foz Formation	Portugal	A member of the family Chloranthaceae. Genus includes new species H. crystallifera.	
Kvacekispermum costatum	Sp. nov	Valid	Friis, Crane & Pedersen	Early Cretaceous (late Barremian-early Aptian)	Almargem Formation	Portugal		

=== Basal eudicots ===
==== Proteales ====
Name	Novelty	Status	Authors	Age	Type locality	Location	Notes	Images
Meliosma berryi	Sp. nov	Valid	Huegele & Manchester	Probably late Eocene		United States (Texas)	A species of Meliosma.	
Platanus heilongjiangensis	Sp. nov	Valid	Sun et al.	Late Cretaceous (China)	Houshiigou Formation	China	A species of Platanus.	
Scalarixylon romeroi	Sp. nov	Valid	Pujana & Ruiz	Eocene–Oligocene	Río Turbio Formation	Argentina		

==== Ranunculales ====
Name	Novelty	Status	Authors	Age	Type locality	Location	Notes	Images
Tinospora siwalika	Sp. nov	Valid	Prasad et al.	Late Miocene	Middle Churia Group	Nepal	A species of Tinospora.	

=== Superasterids ===
==== Aquifoliales ====
Name	Novelty	Status	Authors	Age	Type locality	Location	Notes	Images
Ilex angustifolioides	Nom. nov	Valid	Doweld	Miocene		Germany	A holly; a replacement name for Ilex denticulata von Heer (1857).	
Ilex aschutassica	Nom. nov	Valid	Doweld	Oligocene		Kazakhstan	A holly; a replacement name for Ilex integrifolia Baikovskaja (1956).	
Ilex boulayi	Nom. nov	Valid	Doweld	Miocene		France	A holly; a replacement name for Ilex undulata Boulay (1887).	
Ilex friedrichii	Nom. nov	Valid	Doweld	Oligocene		Germany	A holly; a replacement name for Ilex longifolia Friedrich (1884).	
Ilex latifolioides	Nom. nov	Valid	Doweld	Oligocene		France	A holly; a replacement name for Ilex acuminata Saporta (1865).	
Ilex mormonica	Nom. nov	Valid	Doweld	Oligocene		United States (Montana)	A holly; a replacement name for Ilex acuminata Becker (1960).	
Ilex opacina	Nom. nov	Valid	Doweld	Oligocene		France	A holly; a replacement name for Ilex microdonta Saporta (1865).	
Ilex polarica	Nom. nov	Valid	Doweld	Paleocene		Greenland	A holly; a replacement name for Ilex macrophylla von Heer (1869).	
Ilex subrotunda	Sp. nov	Valid	Doweld	Miocene		Japan	A holly; a replacement name for the previously invalidly published Ilex ohashii Huzioka (1963), lacking holotype designation when published.	

==== Asterales ====
Name	Novelty	Status	Authors	Age	Type locality	Location	Notes	Images
Cichoreacidites? igapoensis	Sp. nov	Valid	D'Apolito et al.	Pliocene–Pleistocene		Brazil	Fossil pollen of a member of the genus Pacourina or Vernonia.	

==== Boraginales ====
Name	Novelty	Status	Authors	Age	Type locality	Location	Notes	Images
Cordia siwalica	Sp. nov	Valid	Prasad et al.	Middle Miocene	Lower Churia Group	Nepal	A species of Cordia.	

==== Caryophyllales ====
Name	Novelty	Status	Authors	Age	Type locality	Location	Notes	Images
Basella keralensis	Sp. nov	Valid	Farooqui, Ray & Garg	Pleistocene		India	A species of Basella.	

==== Cornales ====
Name	Novelty	Status	Authors	Age	Type locality	Location	Notes	Images
Eydeia jerseyensis	Sp. nov	Valid	Atkinson, Martínez & Crepet	Late Cretaceous (Turonian)		United States (New Jersey)		

==== Ericales ====
Name	Novelty	Status	Authors	Age	Type locality	Location	Notes	Images
Juddicarpon	Gen. et sp. nov	Valid	Smith & Manchester	Miocene (Burdigalian-Langhian)	Clarkia fossil beds	United States (Idaho)	A member of Vaccinioideae. Genus includes new species J. benewahensis.	
Psilastephanocolporites brevissimus	Sp. nov	Valid	D'Apolito et al.	Pliocene–Pleistocene		Brazil	Fossil pollen of a flowering plant, possibly a member of the genus Myrsine.	
Sladenia zhengyii	Sp. nov	Valid	Jia & Zhou in Jia et al.	Early Miocene	Maguan Basin	China	A member of the family Sladeniaceae. Announced in 2019; the final version of the article naming it was published in 2021.	
Symplocos amoena	Sp. nov	Valid	Huegele & Manchester	Probably late Eocene		United States (Texas)	A species of Symplocos.	
Symplocos fritschii	Sp. nov	Valid	Huegele & Manchester	Probably late Eocene		United States (Texas)	A species of Symplocos.	
Symplocos martinettoi	Sp. nov	Valid	Huegele & Manchester	Probably late Eocene		United States (Texas)	A species of Symplocos.	
Symplocos platycarpa	Sp. nov	Valid	Huegele & Manchester	Probably late Eocene		United States (Texas)	A species of Symplocos.	
Symplocos rothwelii	Sp. nov	Valid	Huegele & Manchester	Probably late Eocene		United States (Texas)	A species of Symplocos.	
Symplocos trinitiensis	Sp. nov	Valid	Huegele & Manchester	Probably late Eocene		United States (Texas)	A species of Symplocos.	
Symplocos trisulcata	Sp. nov	Valid	Huegele & Manchester	Probably late Eocene		United States (Texas)	A species of Symplocos.	

==== Gentianales ====
Name	Novelty	Status	Authors	Age	Type locality	Location	Notes	Images
Calycophyllum plengei	Sp. nov	Valid	Woodcock, Meyer & Prado	Eocene	Piedra Chamana Fossil Forest	Peru	A species of Calycophyllum.	
Psilatriporites aspidatus	Sp. nov	Valid	D'Apolito et al.	Pliocene–Pleistocene		Brazil	Fossil pollen of a member of the genus Faramea.	
Randia premacrophylla	Sp. nov	Valid	Prasad et al.	Late Miocene	Middle Churia Group	Nepal	A species of Randia.	

==== Icacinales ====
Name	Novelty	Status	Authors	Age	Type locality	Location	Notes	Images
Iodes acuta	Sp. nov	Valid	Del Rio, Stull & De Franceschi	Early Eocene		France	A member of the family Icacinaceae.	
Iodes parva	Sp. nov	Valid	Del Rio, Thomas & De Franceschi	Late Paleocene		France	A member of the family Icacinaceae.	
Iodes reidii	Sp. nov	Valid	Del Rio, Thomas & De Franceschi	Late Paleocene		France	A member of the family Icacinaceae.	
Iodes rigida	Sp. nov	Valid	Del Rio, Stull & De Franceschi	Early Eocene		France	A member of the family Icacinaceae.	
Iodes rivecourtensis	Sp. nov	Valid	Del Rio, Thomas & De Franceschi	Late Paleocene		France	A member of the family Icacinaceae.	
Iodes sinuosa	Sp. nov	Valid	Del Rio, Thomas & De Franceschi	Late Paleocene		France	A member of the family Icacinaceae.	
Iodes tubulifera	Sp. nov	Valid	Del Rio, Thomas & De Franceschi	Late Paleocene		France	A member of the family Icacinaceae.	

=== Superrosids ===
==== Malvids ====
===== Malvales =====
Name	Novelty	Status	Authors	Age	Type locality	Location	Notes	Images
Anisoptera palaeoscaphula	Sp. nov	Valid	Prasad et al.	Late Miocene	Middle Churia Group	Nepal	A species of Anisoptera.	
Ceiba archeopentandra	Sp. nov	Valid	Woodcock, Meyer & Prado	Eocene	Piedra Chamana Fossil Forest	Peru	A species of Ceiba.	
Ceiba huancabambiana	Sp. nov	Valid	Woodcock, Meyer & Prado	Eocene	Piedra Chamana Fossil Forest	Peru	A species of Ceiba.	
Dipterocarpus palaeoindicus	Sp. nov	Valid	Prasad et al.	Late Miocene	Middle Churia Group	Nepal	A species of Dipterocarpus.	
Dryobalanoxylon neosumatrense	Sp. nov	Valid	Biswas, Khan & Bera	Late Miocene		India	A member of the family Dipterocarpaceae.	
Grewia americana	Sp. nov	Valid	Woodcock, Meyer & Prado	Eocene	Piedra Chamana Fossil Forest	Peru	A species of Grewia.	
Grewia nepalensis	Sp. nov	Valid	Prasad et al.	Middle Miocene	Lower Churia Group	Nepal	A species of Grewia.	
Grewia palaeodisperma	Sp. nov	Valid	Prasad et al.	Late Miocene	Middle Churia Group	Nepal	A species of Grewia.	
Guazuma santacruzensis	Sp. nov	Valid	Woodcock, Meyer & Prado	Eocene	Piedra Chamana Fossil Forest	Peru	A member of the family Malvaceae.	
Luehea stratificata	Sp. nov	Valid	Woodcock, Meyer & Prado	Eocene	Piedra Chamana Fossil Forest	Peru	A species of Luehea.	
Muntingia solapora	Sp. nov	Valid	Woodcock, Meyer & Prado	Eocene	Piedra Chamana Fossil Forest	Peru	A species of Muntingia.	
Ochroma pozoensis	Sp. nov	Valid	Woodcock, Meyer & Prado	Eocene	Piedra Chamana Fossil Forest	Peru	A species of Ochroma.	
Sterculia arjunkholaensis	Sp. nov	Valid	Prasad et al.	Middle Miocene	Lower Churia Group	Nepal	A species of Sterculia.	
Sterculia matrum	Sp. nov	Valid	Woodcock, Meyer & Prado	Eocene	Piedra Chamana Fossil Forest	Peru	A species of Sterculia.	
Vasivaea weigendii	Sp. nov	Valid	Woodcock, Meyer & Prado	Eocene	Piedra Chamana Fossil Forest	Peru		

===== Sapindales =====
Name	Novelty	Status	Authors	Age	Type locality	Location	Notes	Images
Ailanthus maximus	Sp. nov	Valid	Liu, Su & Zhou in Liu et al.	Latest Paleocene to the Late Oligocene	Lunpola Basin; Nima Basin	China	A species of Ailanthus.	
Antrocaryon panamaensis	Sp. nov	Valid	Herrera et al.	Early Miocene	Cucaracha Formation	Panama	A species of Antrocaryon.	
Arytera miolittoralis	Sp. nov	Valid	Prasad et al.	Late Miocene	Middle Churia Group	Nepal	A species of Arytera.	
Arytera nepalensis	Sp. nov	Valid	Prasad et al.	Late Miocene	Middle Churia Group	Nepal	A species of Arytera.	
Buchanania raptiensis	Sp. nov	Valid	Prasad et al.	Late Miocene	Middle Churia Group	Nepal	A species of Buchanania.	
Dodonaea piedra-chamana	Sp. nov	Valid	Woodcock, Meyer & Prado	Eocene	Piedra Chamana Fossil Forest	Peru	A species of Dodonaea.	
Dracontomelon montesii	Sp. nov	Valid	Herrera et al.	Early Miocene	Cucaracha Formation	Panama	A species of Dracontomelon.	
Erythrochiton masotkholaensis	Sp. nov	Valid	Prasad et al.	Late Miocene	Middle Churia Group	Nepal	A species of Erythrochiton.	
Euphoria churiaensis	Sp. nov	Valid	Prasad et al.	Middle Miocene	Lower Churia Group	Nepal	A member of the family Sapindaceae.	
Koelreuteria lunpolaensis	Sp. nov	Valid	Jiang et al.	Late Oligocene	Lunpola Basin	China	A species of Koelreuteria.	
Rhus asymmetrica	Sp. nov	Valid	Tosal, Sanjuan & Martín-Closas	Early Oligocene		Spain	A sumac.	
Rhus boothillensis	Sp. nov	Valid	Flynn, DeVore & Pigg	Early Eocene	Klondike Mountain Formation	United States (Washington)	A sumac.	Rhus boothillensi
Rhus garwellii	Sp. nov	Valid	Flynn, DeVore & Pigg	Early Eocene	Klondike Mountain Formation	United States (Washington)	A sumac.	Rhus garwellii
Rhus republicensis	Sp. nov	Valid	Flynn, DeVore & Pigg	Early Eocene	Klondike Mountain Formation	United States (Washington)	A sumac.	
Sapindus palaeomukorossi	Sp. nov	Valid	Prasad et al.	Middle Miocene	Lower Churia Group	Nepal	A species of Sapindus.	
Spondias rothwellii	Sp. nov	Valid	Herrera et al.	Early Miocene	Cucaracha Formation	Panama	A species of Spondias.	
Zanthoxylum reynelii	Sp. nov	Valid	Woodcock, Meyer & Prado	Eocene	Piedra Chamana Fossil Forest	Peru	A species of Zanthoxylum.	

===== Other malvids =====
Name	Novelty	Status	Authors	Age	Type locality	Location	Notes	Images
Akania gibsonorum	Sp. nov	Valid	Conran et al.	Early Miocene		New Zealand	A member of the family Akaniaceae.	
Combretum siwalicum	Sp. nov	Valid	Prasad et al.	Late Miocene	Middle Churia Group	Nepal	A species of Combretum.	
Eugenia nepalensis	Sp. nov	Valid	Prasad et al.	Late Miocene	Middle Churia Group	Nepal	A species of Eugenia.	
Miconioidea	Gen. et sp. nov	Valid	Woodcock, Meyer & Prado	Eocene	Piedra Chamana Fossil Forest	Peru	A member of the family Melastomataceae. Genus includes new species M. eocenica.	
Myrceugenellites grandiporosum	Sp. nov	Valid	Ruiz, Brea & Pujana in Ruiz et al.	Paleocene (Danian)	Salamanca Formation	Argentina	A member of the family Myrtaceae. Announced in 2019; the final version of the article naming it is scheduled to be published in 2020.	
Staphylea ochoterenae	Sp. nov	Valid	Hernández-Damián, Cevallos-Ferriz & Huerta-Vergara	Miocene		Mexico	A species of Staphylea.	
Terminalia arjunkholaensis	Sp. nov	Valid	Prasad et al.	Late Miocene	Middle Churia Group	Nepal	A species of Terminalia.	
Turpinia tiffneyi	Sp. nov	Valid	Huegele & Manchester	Probably late Eocene		United States (Texas)	A species of Turpinia.	

==== Fabids ====
===== Fabales =====
Name	Novelty	Status	Authors	Age	Type locality	Location	Notes	Images
Arcoa lindgreni	Sp. nov	Valid	Herendeen & Herrera	Eocene	Green River Formation	United States (Wyoming)	A species of Arcoa.	
Arcoa linearifolia	Comb. nov	Valid	(Lesquereux) Herendeen & Herrera	Eocene; Priabonian	Florissant Formation	United States (Wyoming)	A species of Arcoa. Moved from Mimosites linearifolius (1878); Originally named Caesalpinia (?) linearifolia (1873)	
Bauhinia palaeomonandra	Sp. nov	Valid	Prasad et al.	Middle Miocene	Lower Churia Group	Nepal	A species of Bauhinia.	
Butea nepalensis	Sp. nov	Valid	Prasad et al.	Late Miocene	Middle Churia Group	Nepal	A species of Butea.	
Cassia arjunkholaensis	Sp. nov	Valid	Prasad et al.	Late Miocene	Middle Churia Group	Nepal	A species of Cassia.	
Cercioxylon zeynepae	Sp. nov	Valid	Akkemik	Pliocene	Örencik Formation	Turkey	A relative of redbuds described on the basis of fossil wood.	
Gleditsia europaea	Sp. nov	Valid	Worobiec in Worobiec & Worobiec	Miocene		Poland	A species of Gleditsia.	
Hopeoxylon umarsarensis	Sp. nov	Valid	Shukla, Singh & Mehrotra	Early Eocene	Naredi Formation	India	A member of the family Fabaceae belonging to the subfamily Detarioideae.	
Leguminophyllum kvacekii	Sp. nov	Valid	Worobiec in Worobiec & Worobiec	Miocene		Poland	Fossil leaflets resembling leaflets of extant and fossil members of Fabaceae.	
Millettia arjunkholaensis	Sp. nov	Valid	Prasad et al.	Middle Miocene	Lower Churia Group	Nepal	A species of Millettia.	
Mimosoxylon ceratonioides	Sp. nov	Valid	Akkemik in Akkemik, Akkılıç & Güngör	Early Miocene		Turkey		
Ormosia zhangpuensis	Sp. nov	Valid	Wang et al.	Miocene		China	A species of Ormosia.	
Saraca palaeoindica	Sp. nov	Valid	Prasad et al.	Late Miocene	Middle Churia Group	Nepal	A species of Saraca.	
Sindora eosiamensis	Sp. nov	Valid	Prasad et al.	Middle Miocene	Lower Churia Group	Nepal	A species of Sindora.	
Sindora leguminocarpoides	Sp. nov	Valid	Prasad et al.	Middle Miocene	Lower Churia Group	Nepal	A species of Sindora.	
Tzotziloxylon	Gen. et 2 sp. nov	Valid	Pérez-Lara & Estrada-Ruiz in Pérez-Lara, Estrada-Ruiz & Castañeda-Posadas	Eocene	El Bosque Formation	Mexico	A member of the family Fabaceae belonging to the subfamily Cercidoideae or Dialioideae. Genus includes new species T. cristalliferum and T. eocenica.	

===== Fagales =====
Name	Novelty	Status	Authors	Age	Type locality	Location	Notes	Images
Castanopsis rothwellii	Sp. nov	Valid	Wilf et al.	Eocene		Argentina	A species of Castanopsis.	
Casuarinoxylon ildephonsi	Sp. nov	Valid	Vanner	Miocene		New Zealand	A member of the family Casuarinaceae described on the basis of fossil wood.	
Engelhardia trinitiensis	Sp. nov	Valid	Huegele & Manchester	Probably late Eocene		United States (Texas)	A species of Engelhardia.	
Pterocaryoxylon tuncayi	Sp. nov	Valid	Akkemik in Akkemik, Akkılıç & Güngör	Early Miocene		Turkey		
Quercus shangcunensis	Sp. nov	Valid	Liu et al.	Early Oligocene	Shangcun Formation	China	An oak	

===== Malpighiales =====
Name	Novelty	Status	Authors	Age	Type locality	Location	Notes	Images
Calophyllum mioelatum	Sp. nov	Valid	Prasad et al.	Late Miocene	Middle Churia Group	Nepal	A species of Calophyllum.	
Calophyllum zhangpuensis	Sp. nov	Valid	Wang et al.	Miocene	Fotan Group	China	A species of Calophyllum.	
Elioxylon	Gen. et sp. nov	Valid	Srivastava, Miller & Baas	Late Cretaceous (Maastrichtian)–Paleocene (Danian)	Deccan Intertrappean Beds	India	A wood morphospecies with features of Achariaceae and Salicaceae. Type species includes new species E. seoniensis.	
Garcinia zhangpuensis	Sp. nov	Valid	Wang et al.	Middle Miocene	Fotan Group	China	A species of Garcinia.	
Mascogophyllum	Gen. et sp. nov	Valid	Centeno-González, Porras-Múzquiz & Estrada-Ruiz	Late Cretaceous (late Campanian)	Olmos Formation	Mexico	A possible member of Violaceae. Genus includes new species M. elizondoa.	
Populus erratica	Nom. nov	Valid	Sachse	Late Oligocene and early Miocene		Switzerland; France? Germany? Hungary?	A species of Populus; a replacement name for Juglans heerii Ettingshausen (1853).	
Ryparia arjunkholaensis	Sp. nov	Valid	Prasad et al.	Late Miocene	Middle Churia Group	Nepal	A member of the family Achariaceae.	

===== Oxalidales =====
Name	Novelty	Status	Authors	Age	Type locality	Location	Notes	Images
Caldcluvioxylon torresiae	Sp. nov	Valid	Pujana & Ruiz	Eocene–Oligocene	Río Turbio Formation	Argentina	A member of the family Cunoniaceae.	
Tropidogyne lobodisca	Sp. nov	Valid	Poinar & Chambers	Late Cretaceous (Cenomanian)	Burmese amber	Myanmar	A probable member of Cunoniaceae.	

===== Rosales =====
Name	Novelty	Status	Authors	Age	Type locality	Location	Notes	Images
Artocarpus arjunkholaensis	Sp. nov	Valid	Prasad et al.	Late Miocene	Middle Churia Group	Nepal	A species of Artocarpus.	
Cedrelospermum tibeticum	Sp. nov	Valid	Jia, Su & Zhou in Jia et al.	Late Oligocene	Dingqing Formation	China	A member of Ulmaceae.	
Ficus preglobosa	Sp. nov	Valid	Prasad et al.	Middle Miocene	Lower Churia Group	Nepal	A species of Ficus.	
Frangulops	Gen. et comb. nov	Valid	Doweld	Eocene		United States (Colorado)	A member of Rhamnaceae; a new genus for "Ilex" pseudostenophylla Lesquereux (1883).	
Prunoidoxylon aytugii	Sp. nov	Valid	Akkemik in Akkemik, Akkılıç & Güngör	Early Miocene		Turkey		
Pteroceltis shanwangensis	Sp. nov	Valid	Wong, Dilcher & Uemura	Miocene	Shanwang Formation	China	A species of Pteroceltis.	
Pteroceltis taoae	Sp. nov	Valid	Wong, Dilcher & Uemura	Miocene		China	A species of Pteroceltis.	
Rubus eubaticus	Nom. nov	Valid	Doweld	Miocene		Bulgaria	A species of Rubus; a replacement name for Rubus mucronatus Palamarev (1987).	
Rubus primoricus	Nom. nov	Valid	Doweld	Miocene		Russia (Primorsky Krai)	A species of Rubus; a replacement name for Rubus ellipticus Pavlyutkin (2005).	
Ulmus prestonia	Sp. nov	Valid	Lott, Manchester & Corbett	Miocene		United States (Florida)	An elm.	

==== Unplaced superrosid eudicots ====
Name	Novelty	Status	Authors	Age	Type locality	Location	Notes	Images
Cayratia palaeojaponica	Sp. nov	Valid	Prasad et al.	Late Miocene	Middle Churia Group	Nepal	A species of Cayratia.	
Liquidambar bella	Sp. nov	Valid	Maslova et al.	Eocene	Huangniuling Formation	China	A Liquidambar species saxifragale.	
Yua texana	Sp. nov	Valid	Huegele & Manchester	Probably late Eocene		United States (Texas)	A Yua species vitale.	

=== Other angiosperms ===
Name	Novelty	Status	Authors	Type locality	Type locality	Location	Notes	Images
Baccatocarpon	Gen. et comb. nov	Valid	Bhowal & Sheikh ex Manchester, Ramteke, Kapgate & Smith	Late Cretaceous (Maastrichtian)	Deccan Intertrappean Beds	India	A fossil fruit of a flowering plant of uncertain affinities; a new genus for "Grewia" mohgaoensis Paradkar & Dixit (1984).	
Battenipollis sabrinae	Sp. nov	Valid	Smith et al.	Early Paleogene		Antarctica	An angiosperm pollen species.	
Bonanzacarpum	Gen. et sp. nov	Valid	Manchester & Lott	Early to middle Eocene	Green River Formation	United States (Utah)	A eudicot fruit of uncertain phylogenetic placement. The type species is B. sprungerorum.	
Celastrilex	Gen. et comb. nov	Valid	Doweld	Paleocene		United States (Colorado)	A flowering plant of uncertain phylogenetic placement, described on the basis of fossil leaves; a new genus for "Celastrinites" artocarpidioides Lesquereux (1878).	
Choffaticarpus	Gen. et sp. nov	Valid	Friis, Crane & Pedersen	Early Cretaceous (late Barremian-early Aptian)	Almargem Formation	Portugal	A flowering plant of uncertain phylogenetic placement. Genus includes new species C. compactus.	
Cratolirion	Gen. et sp. nov	Valid	Coiffard, Kardjilov et Bernardes-de-Oliveira in Coiffard et al.	Early Cretaceous	Crato Formation	Brazil	A crown monocot of uncertain phylogenetic placement. Genus includes new species C. bognerianum.	
Dalembia (?) gracilis	Sp. nov	Valid	Herman in Herman et al.	Late Cretaceous (Turonian-Coniacian)	Derevyannye Gory Formation	Russia (Sakha Republic)	A flowering plant described on the basis of fossil leaves.	
Dictyozonia	Gen. et sp. nov	Valid	Friis, Crane & Pedersen	Early Cretaceous (late Barremian-early Aptian)	Almargem Formation	Portugal	A non-eudicot flowering plant of uncertain affinity. Genus includes new species D. pusilla.	
Dinisia	Gen. et sp. nov	Valid	Friis, Crane & Pedersen	Early Cretaceous (late Barremian-early Aptian)	Almargem Formation	Portugal	A non-eudicot flowering plant of uncertain affinity. Genus includes new species D. portugallica.	
Dispariflora	Gen. et sp. nov	Valid	Poinar & Chambers	Late Cretaceous (Cenomanian)	Burmese amber	Myanmar	A flowering plant of uncertain phylogenetic placement, possibly a relative of members of Laurales, especially Southern Hemisphere families allied with the Monimiaceae. Genus includes new species D. robertae.	
Eckhartia	Gen. et 3 sp. nov	Valid	Friis, Crane & Pedersen	Early Cretaceous (late Barremian-early Aptian)	Almargem Formation	Portugal	A non-eudicot flowering plant of uncertain affinity. Genus includes new species E. brevicolumella, E. longicolumella and E. intermedia.	
Eckhartianthus	Gen. et sp. nov	Valid	Friis, Crane & Pedersen	Early Cretaceous (late Barremian-early Aptian)	Almargem Formation	Portugal	A non-eudicot flowering plant of uncertain affinity. Genus includes new species E. lusitanicus.	
Eckhartiopsis	Gen. et sp. nov	Valid	Friis, Crane & Pedersen	Early Cretaceous (late Barremian-early Aptian)	Almargem Formation	Portugal	A non-eudicot flowering plant of uncertain affinity. Genus includes new species E. parva.	
Exalloanthum	Nom. nov	Valid	Poinar	Late Cretaceous (Cenomanian)	Burmese amber	Myanmar	A flowering plant of uncertain phylogenetic placement; a replacement name for Diaphoranthus Poinar (2018).	
Gambierina askiniae	Sp. nov	Valid	Smith et al.	Early Paleogene		Antarctica	An angiosperm pollen species.	
Herendeenoxylon	Gen. et sp. nov	Valid	Chin et al.	Late Cretaceous (Turonian)	Moreno Hill Formation	United States (New Mexico)	A flowering plant of uncertain phylogenetic placement (possibly a member of Ericales), described on the basis of fossil wood. Genus includes new species H. zuniense.	
Ibrahimia	Gen. et sp. nov	Valid	Friis, Crane & Pedersen	Early Cretaceous (late Barremian-early Aptian)	Almargem Formation	Portugal	An eudicot of uncertain phylogenetic placement, possibly related to Paisia. Genus includes new species I. vermiculata.	
Juhaszia	Gen. et sp. nov	Valid	Friis, Crane & Pedersen	Early Cretaceous (late Barremian-early Aptian)	Almargem Formation	Portugal	A non-eudicot flowering plant of uncertain affinity. Genus includes new species J. portugallica.	
Kempia	Gen. et sp. nov	Valid	Friis, Crane & Pedersen	Early Cretaceous (late Barremian-early Aptian)	Almargem Formation	Portugal	A non-eudicot flowering plant of uncertain affinity. Genus includes new species K. longicolpites.	
Ladakhipollenites? densicolumellatus	Sp. nov	Valid	D'Apolito et al.	Pliocene–Pleistocene		Brazil	Fossil pollen of a flowering plant.	
Ladakhipollenites? lolongatus	Sp. nov	Valid	D'Apolito et al.	Pliocene–Pleistocene		Brazil	Fossil pollen of Symmeria paniculata.	
Ladakhipollenites? porolenticularis	Sp. nov	Valid	D'Apolito et al.	Pliocene–Pleistocene		Brazil	Fossil pollen of a flowering plant (possibly a member of the family Marcgraviaceae).	
Lagokarpos tibetensis	Sp. nov	Valid	Tang, Su & Zhou in Tang et al.	Paleogene	Niubao Formation	China	A fossil fruit with unknown modern affinities.	
Mcdougallia	Gen. et sp. nov	Valid	Friis, Crane & Pedersen	Early Cretaceous (late Barremian-early Aptian)	Almargem Formation	Portugal	An eudicot of uncertain phylogenetic placement. Genus includes new species M. irregularis.	
Nicholsia	Gen. et sp. nov	Valid	Friis, Crane & Pedersen	Early Cretaceous (late Barremian-early Aptian)	Almargem Formation	Portugal	An eudicot of uncertain phylogenetic placement. Genus includes new species N. brevicolpites.	
Piercipollis	Gen. et sp. nov	Valid	Friis, Crane & Pedersen	Early Cretaceous (late Barremian-early Aptian)	Almargem Formation	Portugal	A non-eudicot flowering plant of uncertain affinity. Genus includes new species P. simplex.	
Reyanthus	Gen. et sp. nov	Valid	Friis, Crane & Pedersen	Early Cretaceous (late Barremian-early Aptian)	Almargem Formation	Portugal	A flowering plant of uncertain phylogenetic placement, possibly related to Magnoliales. Genus includes new species R. lusitanicus.	
Rhoipites? basicus	Sp. nov	Valid	D'Apolito et al.	Pliocene–Pleistocene		Brazil	Fossil pollen of a flowering plant.	
Rhoipites manausensis	Sp. nov	Valid	D'Apolito et al.	Pliocene–Pleistocene		Brazil	Fossil pollen of a member of the genus Schefflera.	
Rhoipites minuticirculus	Sp. nov	Valid	D'Apolito et al.	Pliocene–Pleistocene		Brazil	Fossil pollen of a flowering plant.	
Rhoipites negroensis	Sp. nov	Valid	D'Apolito et al.	Pliocene–Pleistocene		Brazil	Fossil pollen of a flowering plant.	
Samylinaea	Gen. et sp. nov	Valid	Friis, Crane & Pedersen	Early Cretaceous (late Barremian-early Aptian)	Almargem Formation	Portugal	An eudicot of uncertain phylogenetic placement. Genus includes new species S. punctata.	
Sherwinoxylon	Gen. et sp. nov	Valid	Boura & Saulnier in Boura et al.	Late Cretaceous (Cenomanian)		France	A vesselless angiosperm fossil wood of uncertain affinity. Genus includes new species S. winteroides.	
Strombothelya	Gen. et 2 sp. nov	Valid	Poinar & Chambers	Late Cretaceous (Cenomanian)	Burmese amber	Myanmar	A flowering plant of uncertain phylogenetic placement. Genus includes new species S. monostyla and S. grammogyna.	
Teebacia	Gen. et sp. nov	Valid	Friis, Crane & Pedersen	Early Cretaceous (late Barremian-early Aptian)	Almargem Formation	Portugal	A non-eudicot flowering plant of uncertain affinity. Genus includes new species T. hughesii.	
Ubiquitoxylon	Gen. et sp. nov	Valid	Wheeler in Wheeler, Brown & Koch	Late Paleocene	Denver Formation	United States (Colorado)	A dicotyledonous flowering plant of uncertain phylogenetic placement, described on the basis of fossil wood. Genus includes new species U. raynoldsii.	
Vasunum	Gen. et sp. nov	Valid	Chin et al.	Late Cretaceous (Turonian)	Moreno Hill Formation	United States (New Mexico)	A flowering plant of uncertain phylogenetic placement, described on the basis of fossil wood. Genus includes new species V. cretaceum.	
Vedresia	Gen. et sp. nov	Valid	Friis, Crane & Pedersen	Early Cretaceous (late Barremian-early Aptian)	Almargem Formation	Portugal	A flowering plant of uncertain phylogenetic placement, possibly related to Chloranthales. Genus includes new species V. elliptica.	
Zygadelphus	Gen. et sp. nov	Valid	Poinar & Chambers	Late Cretaceous (Cenomanian)	Burmese amber	Myanmar	A flowering plant of uncertain phylogenetic placement, possibly a member of Laurales. Genus includes new species Z. aetheus.	

== Other plants ==
Name	Novelty	Status	Authors	Age	Type locality	Location	Notes	Images
Acetabularia moldavica	Sp. nov	Valid	Barattolo, Ionesi & Ţibuleac	Middle Miocene		Romania	A green alga belonging to the family Polyphysaceae, a species of Acetabularia.	
Aloisalthella	Gen. et comb. nov	Valid	Granier in Granier & Lethiers	Late Jurassic and Early Cretaceous (Berriasian)		Algeria; France; Spain; Ukraine; United Arab Emirates	A green alga belonging to the family Polyphysaceae; a new genus for "Actinoporella" sulcata von Alth (1882).	
Aneurospora posongchongensis	Sp. nov	Valid	Cascales-Miñana et al.	Early Devonian	Posongchong Formation	China	A spore taxon.	
Auerbachichara tataouinensis	Sp. nov	Valid	Tiss et al.	Middle Jurassic (Callovian)	Foum Tataouine Formation	Tunisia	A green alga belonging to the group Charophyta.	
Bakalovaella deloffrei	Sp. nov	Valid	Granier & Bucur	Early Cretaceous (Hauterivian)		France	A green alga belonging to the family Dasycladaceae.	
Buthograptus gundersoni	Sp. nov	Valid	LoDuca	Ordovician (Sandbian)	Platteville Formation	United States (Wisconsin)	A green alga belonging to the group Bryopsidales.	
Buthograptus meyeri	Sp. nov	Valid	LoDuca	Ordovician (Sandbian)	Platteville Formation	United States (Wisconsin)	A green alga belonging to the group Bryopsidales.	
Calcipatera schoenlaubi	Sp. nov	Valid	Vachard in Krainer, Vachard & Schaffhauser	Permian		Austria; Oman? United States? (New Mexico)	A green alga belonging to the group Bryopsidales and the family Anchicodiaceae.	
Callixylon wendtii	Sp. nov	Valid	Tanrattana, Meyer-Berthaud & Decombeix	Devonian (Famennian)		Morocco	An archaeopteridalean progymnosperm.	
Cingulatisporites oligodistalis	Sp. nov	Valid	D'Apolito et al.	Pliocene–Pleistocene		Brazil	Fossil spore.	
Concavissimisporites varzeanus	Sp. nov	Valid	D'Apolito et al.	Pliocene–Pleistocene		Brazil	Fossil spore.	
Coniopteris moguqiensis	Sp. nov	Valid	Zhang, Liu & Liang	Middle Jurassic	Wanbao Formation	China		
Dissocladella? chahtorshiana	Sp. nov	Valid	Rashidi & Schlagintweit in Schlagintweit et al.	Paleocene		Iran	A green alga belonging to the family Dasycladaceae.	
Dissocladella compressa	Sp. nov	Valid	Rashidi & Schlagintweit	Late Cretaceous (Maastrichtian)	Tarbur Formation	Iran	A green alga belonging to the group Dasycladales.	
Echinatisporis parviechinatus	Sp. nov	Valid	D'Apolito et al.	Pliocene–Pleistocene		Brazil	Fossil spore.	
Echinosporis conicus	Sp. nov	Valid	D'Apolito et al.	Pliocene–Pleistocene		Brazil	Fossil spore.	
Electrophycus	Gen. et sp. nov	Disputed	Poinar & Brown	Late Cretaceous (Cenomanian)	Burmese amber	Myanmar	Originally described as a green alga, possibly a member of the family Chaetophoraceae, but subsequently argued to be a flowering plant and a junior synonym of Antiquifloris. Genus includes new species E. astroplethus. Announced in 2019; the final version of the article naming it was published in 2021.	
Epiastopora	Gen. et comb. nov	Valid	Vachard in Krainer, Vachard & Schaffhauser	Carboniferous (Pennsylvanian) and Permian			A green alga belonging to the group Dasycladales and the family Seletonellaceae. A new genus for "Epimastopora" alpina Kochansky & Herak (1960) and several other species formerly assigned to the genera Epimastopora and Pseudoepimastopora.	
Jowingera	Gen. et sp. nov	Valid	Bickner & Tomescu	Devonian (Emsian)	Battery Point Formation	Canada (Quebec)	An early euphyllophyte. Genus includes new species J. triloba.	
Leonophyllum	Gen. et sp. nov	Valid	Barbacka & Kustatscher in Barbacka et al.	Early Jurassic		Hungary	A plant of uncertain phylogenetic placement, showing similarities to thalloid liverworts with raised vegetative bodies and to the fern family Hymenophyllaceae. Genus includes new species L. tenellum.	
Leptocentroxyla	Gen. et sp. nov	Valid	Bickner & Tomescu	Devonian (Emsian)	Battery Point Formation	Canada (Quebec)	An early euphyllophyte. Genus includes new species L. tetrarcha.	
Maiaspora	Gen. et sp. nov	Valid	Mamontov et al.	Carboniferous (Viséan)	Moscow Syneclise	Russia	A miospore. Genus includes new species M. panopta. Announced in 2019; the final version of the article naming it was published in 2021.	
Ninsaria	Gen. et sp. nov	Valid	Decombeix, Galtier, McLoughlin & Meyer-Berthaud in Decombeix et al.	Carboniferous (Viséan)	Rockhampton Group	Australia	A vascular plant belonging to the group Lignophytia, of uncertain phylogenetic placement within the latter group. Genus includes new species N. australiana.	
Palambages pariunta	Sp. nov	Valid	Wainman et al.	Late Jurassic (late Kimmeridgian–early Tithonian)	Surat Basin	Australia	A colonial alga belonging to the group Chlorophyta.	
Patruliuspora	Gen. et comb. nov	Valid	Barattolo, Ionesi & Ţibuleac	Late Triassic to Miocene		Czech Republic; France; Slovakia	A green alga belonging to the family Polyphysaceae. Genus includes "Chalmasia" morelleti Pokorný (1948), "Halicoryne" carpatica Mišík (1987) and "Acicularia" valeti Segonzac (1970).	
Porochara schudackii	Sp. nov	Valid	Tiss et al.	Middle Jurassic (Bajocian)	Krachoua Formation	Tunisia	A green alga belonging to the group Charophyta.	
Pseudocymopolia acuta	Sp. nov	Valid	Rashidi & Schlagintweit	Late Cretaceous (Maastrichtian)	Tarbur Formation	Iran	A green alga belonging to the group Dasycladales and to the family Triploporellaceae.	
Stenoloboxyla	Gen. et sp. nov	Valid	Bickner & Tomescu	Devonian (Emsian)	Battery Point Formation	Canada (Quebec)	An early euphyllophyte. Genus includes new species S. ambigua.	
Tainioxyla	Gen. et sp. nov	Valid	Bickner & Tomescu	Devonian (Emsian)	Battery Point Formation	Canada (Quebec)	An early euphyllophyte. Genus includes new species T. quebecana.	
Tichavekia	Gen. et sp. nov	Valid	Pšenička, Sakala & Kraft in Kraft et al.	Late Silurian	Prague Basin	Czech Republic	A large early land plant. Genus includes new species T. grandis.	
Uteria naghanensis	Sp. nov	Valid	Rashidi & Schlagintweit	Late Cretaceous (Maastrichtian)	Tarbur Formation	Iran	A green alga belonging to the family Polyphysaceae.	
Verrucatotriletes laesuraverrucatus	Sp. nov	Valid	D'Apolito et al.	Pliocene–Pleistocene		Brazil	Fossil spore.	
Verrucatotriletes tortus	Sp. nov	Valid	D'Apolito et al.	Pliocene–Pleistocene		Brazil	Fossil spore.	

== General research ==
- Description of fossils of filamentous green algae from the Early Devonian Rhynie chert (Scotland) is published by Wellman, Graham & Lewis (2019).
- Cretaceous alga Falsolikanella campanensis, originally assigned to the tribe Diploporeae within the green alga order Dasycladales, is transferred to the genus Actinoporella within the tribe Acetabularieae, family Polyphysaceae by Barattolo et al. (2019).
- A study on the impact of the Cretaceous–Paleogene extinction event on European charophytes is published by Vicente, Csiki-Sava & Martín-Closas (2019).
- The oldest known trilete spore assemblages reported so far are described from the Sandbian successions from Motala (central Sweden) by Rubinstein & Vajda (2019).
- A study on the composition and distribution of dispersed spore assemblages from Middle Devonian deposits of northern Spain, and on their implications for inferring the nature of the Kačák Event, is published by Askew & Wellman (2019).
- A study on the morphology of the spore taxon Lagenoisporites magnus from the Carboniferous (Tournaisian) Toregua Formation (Bolivia) is published by Quetglas, Macluf & di Pasquo (2019).
- A review of research concerning early evolution of land plants during the Ordovician is published by Servais et al. (2019).
- A study on carbon isotope data from stratigraphic sections at Germany Valley (West Virginia) and Union Furnace (Pennsylvania) in the Central Appalachian Basin, evaluating its implications for the knowledge of change in atmospheric oxygen levels during the late Ordovician and its possible relationship with early diversification of land plants, is published by Adiatma et al. (2019).
- A study on the stable carbon isotopic composition of 190 fossil specimens belonging to 12 genera of Devonian and Early Carboniferous land plants is published by Wan et al. (2019).
- A study on the early evolution of vascular plants is published by Cascales-Miñana et al. (2019).
- A study on the evolution of early vascular plants is published by Crepet & Niklas (2019).
- A study on the fine-scale structure and the chemistry of the tracheids of the earliest known woody plant Armoricaphyton chateaupannense is published by Strullu-Derrien et al. (2019).
- A study on diversity and functions of lycopsid reproductive structures through time, based on data from extant and fossil taxa, is published by Bonacorsi & Leslie (2019).
- Redescription of the morphology of sterile and fertile structures of the Devonian lycopsid Kossoviella timanica is published by Orlova et al. (2019).
- A study on the ultrastructure of the spore wall in the Carboniferous lycopsid Oxroadia gracilis is published by Taylor (2019).
- A slab containing rooting systems which probably belonged to rhizomorphic lycopsids is reported from the Lower Permian Abo Formation (New Mexico, United States) by Hetherington et al. (2019).
- A study on the anatomy and affinities of Cheirostrobus pettycurensis is published by Neregato & Hilton (2019), who report the discovery of spores conforming to the species Retusotriletes incohatus associated with fossils of Cheirostrobus, representing the first discovery of Retusotriletes-type spores reported in situ within sphenophytes.
- A study on the anatomy and affinities of silicified stems of Sphenophyllum from the Tournaisian deposits in the Montagne Noire region of France and in the Saalfeld area in Germany is published by Terreaux de Felice, Decombeix & Galtier (2019).
- Fossils assigned to the genus Equisetum are reported from a new fossil plant assemblage of late Eocene or early Oligocene age from central Queensland (Australia) by Rozefelds et al. (2019), representing the first evidence of this genus from the Cenozoic of Australia and the most recent fossil record of this genus from Australia.
- A study on the evolutionary history of horsetails, based on genetic data and fossil record, is published by Clark, Puttick & Donoghue (2019), who report evidence indicative of two successive whole-genome duplication events occurring during the Carboniferous and Triassic rather than in association with the Cretaceous–Paleogene extinction event.
- A study aiming to determine links between volcanic activity in the Central Atlantic magmatic province, elevated concentrations of mercury in marine and terrestrial sediments and abnormalities of fossil fern spores across the Triassic-Jurassic boundary in southern Scandinavia and northern Germany is published by Lindström et al. (2019).
- A study on the fossil record of fern spores at the Cretaceous-Paleogene boundary, on the viability of fern spores, and on their implications for the knowledge of the duration of the impact winter at the Cretaceous-Paleogene boundary is published by Berry (2019).
- A study on the molecular structural characteristics of organic remains of a fern belonging to the family Osmundaceae from the Early Jurassic Korsaröd site in southern Sweden is published by Qu et al. (2019).
- A study on anatomy and growth of large specimens of the fossil fern species Weichselia reticulata from the Barremian La Huérguina Formation (Spain) is published by Blanco-Moreno et al. (2019).
- A study on the morphological characters of 42 fossil species of Dicksoniaceae from China, and on their implications for the taxonomy of the fossil members of this group, is published by Xin et al. (2019).
- Fossil occurrences of members of the genus Christella are reported from the late Paleocene of Liuqu, southern Tibet and middle Miocene of the Jinggu Basin in western Yunnan (China) by Xu et al. (2019), who transfer the species "Cyclosorus" nervosus Tao (1988) to the genus Christella.
- A study on the fossils of Glossopteris from the Permian succession of eastern India, aiming to identify the molecular signatures of solvent-extractable and non-extractable organic matter, will be published by Tewari et al. (2019).
- A study on the diversity trends of Glossopteris flora from the Barakar, Raniganj, and Panchet formations of Tatapani–Ramkola Coalfield (India) is published by Saxena et al. (2019).
- A study on the architecture of the ovuliferous reproductive organs of Permian glossopterids is published by Mcloughlin & Prevec (2019).
- A study on the pinnule and stomatal morphology of extant and fossil members of the genera Bowenia and Eobowenia, and on its implications for the knowledge of adaptations of fossil plants to different environments, is published by Hill, Hill & Watling (2019).
- Seed of the ginkgoalean Yimaia capituliformis with damage interpreted as likely oviposition lesions inflicted by a kalligrammatid lacewing is described from the Middle Jurassic Jiulongshan Formation (China) by Meng et al. (2019).
- A study on the phytogeographic history of ten conifer genera that are endemic to East Asia, based on fossil data from humid temperate forests in the Japanese Islands and Korean Peninsula, is published by Yabe et al. (2019).
- A study on the evolution of male and female cone sizes in members of the family Araucariaceae, as indicated by data from extant and fossil members of this family, is published by Gleiser et al. (2019).
- Five fossil foliage specimens of Calocedrus lantenoisi, representing one of the earliest records of the genus Calocedrus worldwide, are described from the Oligocene Shangcun Formation of the Maoming Basin (Guangdong Province, South China) by Wu et al. (2019).
- Leaves including cuticles and ovuliferous cones of members of the genus Metasequoia are described from the middle Miocene of Zhenyuan, Yunnan (Southwest China) by Wang et al. (2019), comprising the southernmost fossil record of this genus worldwide.
- A review of the fossil record of woods which might have affinities with Taxaceae, and a study on the palaeobiogeographical history of this family, is published by Philippe et al. (2019).
- Putative Cretaceous siliceous sponge Siphonia bovista is reinterpreted as an internal mould of the cone-like plant fossil Dammarites albens by Niebuhr (2019).
- A review of epidermal features of bennettites, comparing them with analogous features in living taxa and aiming to identify homologous character states, is published by Rudall & Bateman (2019).
- The first fossil record of a cycad seedling found in close association with a leaf flush of an adult cycad plant of the same species (Dioonopsis praespinulosa) is reported from the Palaeocene (Danian) Castle Rock flora in the Denver Basin (Colorado, United States) by Erdei et al. (2019).
- A review of the paleobotanical evidence of the age and early history of the flowering plants is published by Coiro, Doyle & Hilton (2019).
- A study aiming to establish when the flowering plants originated is published by Li et al. (2019).
- Presence of endothelium (a specialized seed tissue that develops from the inner epidermis of the inner integument) is reported in several different kinds of flowering plant seeds (including in the lineage leading to extant Chloranthaceae) from the Early Cretaceous of eastern North America and Portugal by Friis, Crane & Pedersen (2019).
- A study on the phylogenetic relationships of palm fruit fossils from the Cretaceous–Paleogene (Maastrichtian–Danian) Deccan Intertrappean Beds (India) is published by Matsunaga et al. (2019), who interpret these fossils as representing a crown group member of palm subtribe Hyphaeninae (tribe Borasseae, subfamily Coryphoideae) related to extant genera Satranala and Bismarckia.
- Fossil fruits of members of the genera Fragaria and Rubus are reported from the Pliocene outcrops in the Heqing Basin (China) by Huang et al. (2019).
- Description of alder leaf and infructescence fossils from the Upper Eocene Lawula Formation (Qinghai–Tibetan Plateau) is published by Xu, Su & Zhou (2019).
- A study on the morphology, paleoecology, historical biogeography and phylogenetic relationships of fossil pollen of members of Malvaceae belonging to the species Rhoipites guianensis and Malvacipolloides maristellae, and on its implications for inferring the impact of Cenozoic geological processes (including the uplift of the Andes) on members of Malvaceae living in northern South America, is published by Hoorn et al. (2019).
- A study aiming to determine the location of refugia of two North American species of hickories during the Last Glacial Maximum on the basis of genomic data is published by Bemmels, Knowles & Dick (2019).
- A study on functional leaf traits of the Eocene-Miocene taxa Rhodomyrtophyllum reticulosum (family Myrtaceae) and Platanus neptuni (family Platanaceae), evaluating whether leaf traits of these taxa reflect environmental conditions including climate, is published by Moraweck et al. (2019).
- A study on the morphology and phylogenetic relationships of Eocene fruits belonging to the species Mastixicarpum crassum and Eomastixia bilocularis is published by Manchester & Collinson (2019).
- Seeds of Eurya stigmosa are reported from the Early Pleistocene lacustrine and fluvial sediments of Porto da Cruz, Madeira by Góis-Marques et al. (2019).
- A study on the putative cycad "Zamia" australis from the Miocene Ñirihuau Formation (Argentina) is published by Passalia, Caviglia & Vera (2019), who reinterpret the fossil specimens as flowering plant leaves, and transfer this species to the genus Lithraea.
- New method for reconstructing water transport properties of fossil wood is proposed by Tanrattana et al. (2019).
- Signatures of Devonian (Famennian) forests and soils preserved in black shales in the southernmost Appalachian Basin (Chattanooga Shale; Alabama, United States) are presented by Lu et al. (2019).
- A study on reproductive structures of Devonian plants and on their implications for the knowledge of large-scale patterns of reproductive evolution over the Devonian is published by Bonacorsi & Leslie (2019).
- Revision of a fossil plant assemblage from the Carboniferous site in San Juan Province, Argentina known as Retamito or Río del Agua is published by Correa & Césari (2019).
- A study on the stratigraphic ranges and diversities of plant taxa from the upper Permian (Lopingian) to the Middle Triassic is published by Nowak, Schneebeli-Hermann & Kustatscher (2019), who interpret their findings as indicating that the extinction of land plants during the Permian–Triassic extinction event was much less severe than previously thought.
- A study on the timing of the collapse of the Permian Glossopteris flora from the Sydney Basin (Australia) is published by Fielding et al. (2019).
- New fossil flora dominated by cuticles of Dicroidium is reported from the Middle Triassic (Anisian) Mukheiris Formation (Jordan) by Abu Hamad et al. (2019).
- A study on changes of land vegetation resulting from the Toarcian oceanic anoxic event is published by Slater et al. (2019).
- Plant disseminules are documented from four Middle Jurassic to Lower Cretaceous lacustrine Lagerstätten in China and Australia by McLoughlin & Pott (2019).
- A study comparing the Jurassic floras of the Ayuquila Basin and the Otlaltepec Basin (Mexico) and evaluating their implications for the knowledge of the Jurassic environments of these basins is published by Velasco-de León et al. (2019).
- A study on phototropism in extant trees from Beijing and Jilin Provinces and fossil tree trunks from the Jurassic Tiaojishan and Tuchengzi formations in Liaoning and Beijing regions (China), and on its implications for inferring the history of the rotation of the North China Block, is published by Jiang et al. (2019).
- A study on the link between climatic changes and changes plant distribution in South America during the Early Cretaceous, as indicated by palynological data from the Aptian of the Sergipe Basin (Brazil), is published by Carvalho et al. (2019).
- A study on the frequency and diversity of damage types caused by insect oviposition in plants from the Upper Triassic Yangcaogou Formation, Middle Jurassic Jiulongshan Formation and Lower Cretaceous Yixian Formation (China), assessing the degree of plant host specificity, is published by Lin et al. (2019).
- A study on the plant specimens (ferns, gymnosperms and angiosperms) from the Lower Cretaceous Araripe Basin (Brazil) preserving evidence of plant–insect interactions and potentially of paleoecological relationships between plants and insects is published by Edilson Bezerra dos Santos Filho et al. (2019).
- Leaves of members of the family Nymphaeaceae preserving evidence of insect herbivory are reported from the Albian Utrillas Formation (Spain) by Estévez-Gallardo et al. (2019).
- A study on Cenomanian plants from the Redmond no.1 mine near Schefferville (Redmond Formation; Labrador Peninsula, Canada) and on their implications for the knowledge of paleoclimate of this site is published by Demers-Potvin & Larsson (2019).
- A study on the canopy structure of Late Cretaceous and Paleocene forests in South America, as indicated by the carbon isotope composition of fossil angiosperm leaves from two localities in the Paleocene Cerrejón Formation and one locality in the Maastrichtian Guaduas Formation (Colombia), is published by Graham et al. (2019).
- A quantitative analysis of an earliest Paleocene megaflora from the Ojo Alamo Sandstone in the San Juan Basin (New Mexico, United States) is published by Flynn & Peppe (2019).
- A study on the evolution of plant assemblages in the area of Primorye (Russia) throughout the Paleogene is published by Bondarenko, Blokhina & Utescher (2019).
- A study on changes in plant and insect communities across the Paleocene–Eocene boundary within the Hanna Basin (Wyoming, United States) is published by Azevedo Schmidt et al. (2019).
- A study on stomata of fossil specimens of members of the family Lauraceae from the Eocene of Australia and New Zealand, evaluating their implications for reconstructions of Eocene pCO_{2} levels, is published by Steinthorsdottir et al. (2019).
- Description of early Eocene leaf fossils from the Dinmore locality (Redbank Plains Formation, Booval Basin; Australia) and a study on the implications of these fossils for reconstructions of paleoclimate is published by Pole (2019).
- A study on changes of plant communities from the Herren beds (Oregon, United States) during the Eocene and on the implications of plant fossils from this area for the reconstruction of Eocene climate is published by Jijina, Currano & Constenius (2019).
- Su et al. (2019) use radiometrically dated plant fossil assemblages to quantify when southeastern Tibet achieved its present elevation, and what kind of floras existed there at that time.
- Description of a plant megafossil assemblage from the Kailas Formation in western part of the southern Lhasa terrane, and a study on its implications for inferring the elevation history of the southern Tibetan Plateau, is published by Ai et al. (2019).
- A study on the dynamics and evolution of the flora of Turgai ecological type in Western Siberia during the early Oligocene to earliest Miocene is published by Popova et al. (2019).
- A study on the paleoclimate, vegetational type and ecological strategies adopted by fossil plants from the Oligocene Baigang Formation (China), as indicated by characteristics of fossil leaves from this formation, is published by Li et al. (2019).
- Description of a fossil plant assemblage from the Miocene Hattiesburg Formation (Mississippi, United States) is published by McNair et al. (2019).
- A study on changes of C_{4} vegetation composition in southwestern Montana (United States) from the late Miocene through present is published by Hyland et al. (2019).
- A study aiming to test the hypothesis that fire contributed to the rise of C_{3}-dominated grasslands in Eurasia, based on data from core retrieved from the late Miocene to Pleistocene sediments from the Black Sea, is published by Feurdean & Vasiliev (2019).
- A study on the origin of the African C_{4} savannah grasslands is published by Polissar et al. (2019).
- A study on vegetation changes in west African tropical montane forest over the past 90,000 years, as indicated by pollen data from the Lake Bambili site (Cameroon), is published by Lézine et al. (2019).
- A study on changes of vegetation in southern Borneo over the past 40,000 calibrated years BP, as indicated by data from Saleh Cave (South Kalimantan, Indonesia), is published by Wurster et al. (2019).
- A study on the role of past climate, extinct megafauna and guanaco in shaping the vegetation of the Patagonian steppe is published by Hernández, Ríos & Perotto-Baldivieso (2019).
- The discovery of ancient chestnut, hazelnut and flax DNA recovered from stalagmites from the Solkota cave (Georgia) is reported by Stahlschmidt et al. (2019).
- The discovery of oldest fossil trees, dating back 386 million years, in the Catskill region near Cairo, New York, is published online by Stein et al. (2019).
