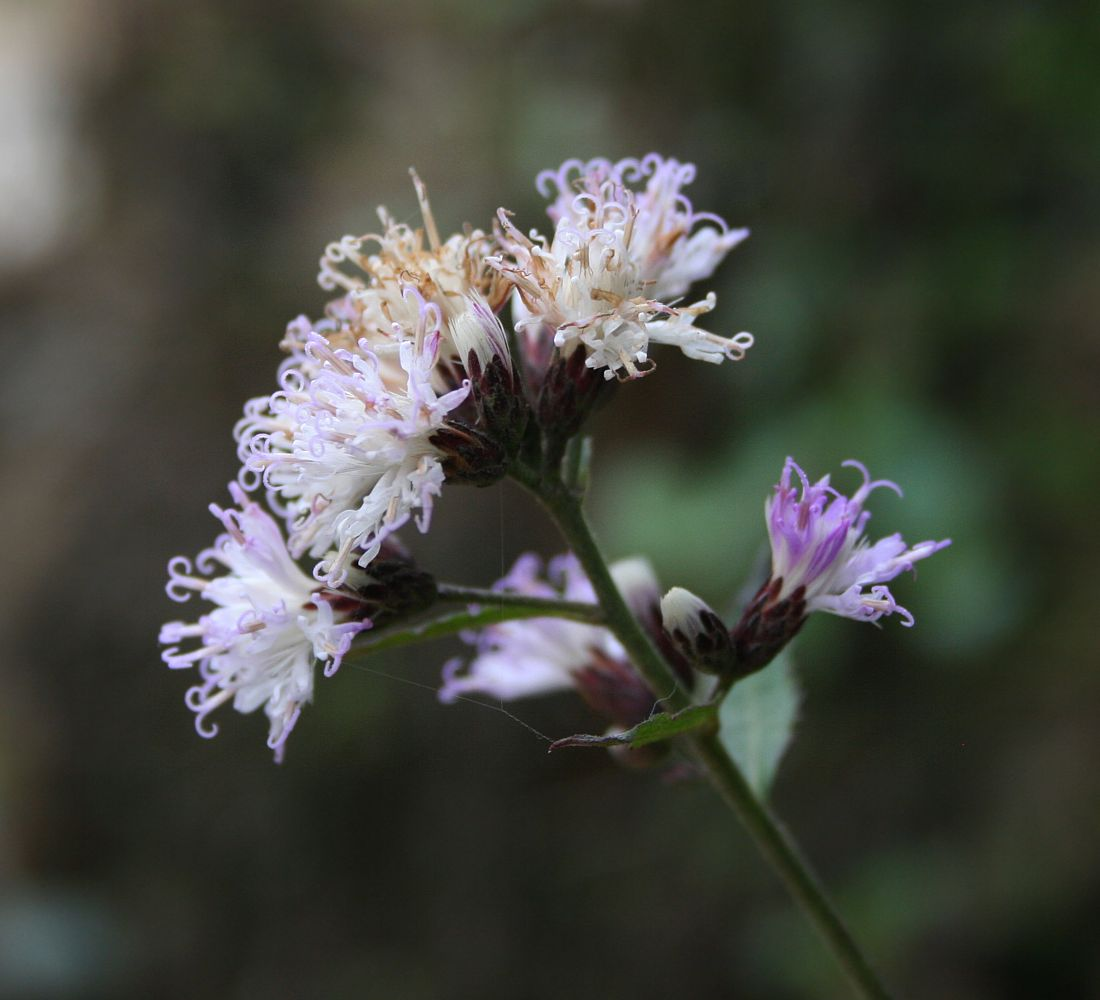
- Acilepis saligna
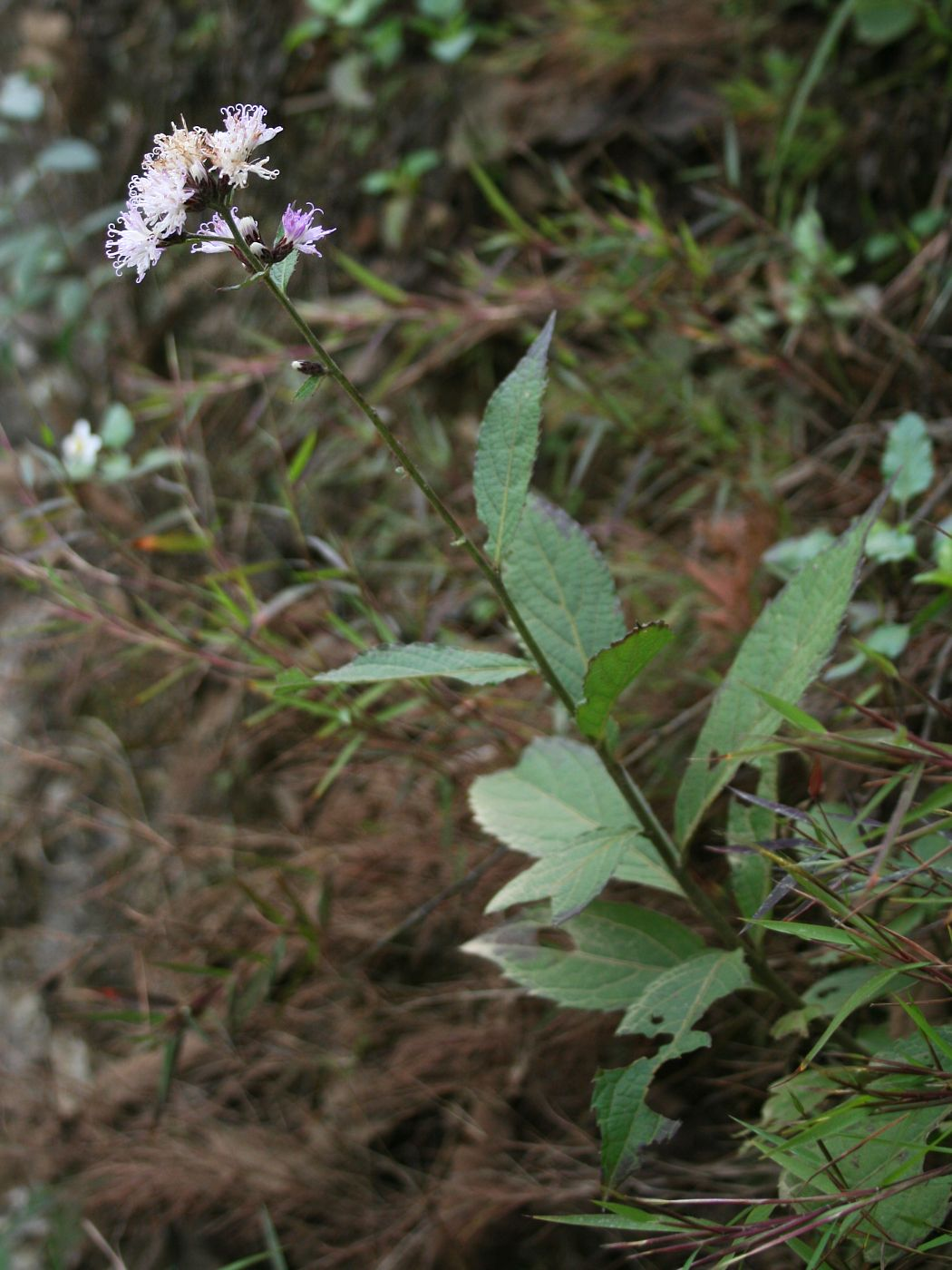
- Acilepis saligna

Scientific classification
- Kingdom: Plantae
- Clade: Tracheophytes
- Clade: Angiosperms
- Clade: Eudicots
- Clade: Asterids
- Order: Asterales
- Family: Asteraceae
- Subfamily: Cichorioideae
- Tribe: Vernonieae
- Genus: Acilepis; D.Don

Type species
- Acilepis squarrosa D.Don

Synonyms
- Xipholepis Steetz; Lysistemma Steetz; Vernonia Acilepis group

= Acilepis =

Genus of flowering plants

Acilepis is a genus of Asian plants in the tribe Vernonieae within the family Asteraceae.

== Taxonomy ==
=== Species ===
As of July 2020, Plants of the World Online has 37 accepted species:

- Acilepis anaimudica (B.V.Shetty & Vivek.) Kottaim.
- Acilepis aspera (Buch.-Ham.) H.Rob.
- Acilepis attenuata (DC.) H.Rob. & Skvarla
- Acilepis belcheri H.Rob. & Skvarla
- Acilepis chiangdaoensis (H.Koyama) H.Rob. & Skvarla
- Acilepis clivorum (Hance) H.Rob.
- Acilepis dendigulensis (DC.) H.Rob.
- Acilepis divergens (Roxb.) H.Rob. & Skvarla
- Acilepis doichangensis (H.Koyama) H.Rob. & Skvarla
- Acilepis fysonii (Calder) H.Rob. & Skvarla
- Acilepis gardneri (Thwaites) H.Rob. & Skvarla
- Acilepis heynei (Bedd. ex Gamble) H.Rob. & Skvarla
- Acilepis kerrii (Craib) Bunwong, Chantar. & S.C.Keeley
- Acilepis kingii (C.B.Clarke) H.Rob. & Skvarla
- Acilepis lobbii (Hook.f.) H.Rob. & Skvarla
- Acilepis namnaoensis (H.Koyama) H.Rob. & Skvarla
- Acilepis nantcianensis (Pamp.) H.Rob.
- Acilepis nayarii (Uniyal) H.Rob. & Skvarla
- Acilepis nemoralis (Thwaites) H.Rob. & Skvarla
- Acilepis ngaoensis (H.Koyama) H.Rob. & Skvarla
- Acilepis ornata (Talbot) H.Rob. & Skvarla
- Acilepis peguensis (C.B.Clarke) H.Rob. & Skvarla
- Acilepis peninsularis (C.B.Clarke) H.Rob. & Skvarla
- Acilepis pothigaiana (Chellad. & Gopalan) Kottaim.
- Acilepis principis (Gagnep.) H.Rob. & Skvarla
- Acilepis pseudosutepensis (H.Koyama) H.Rob. & Skvarla
- Acilepis pulneyensis (Gamble) Kottaim.
- Acilepis saligna (DC.) H.Rob.
- Acilepis scariosa (DC.) H.Rob.
- Acilepis setigera (Arn.) H.Rob. & Skvarla
- Acilepis silhetensis (DC.) H.Rob.
- Acilepis spirei (Gand.) H.Rob.
- Acilepis squarrosa D.Don
- Acilepis sutepensis (Kerr) H.Rob. & Skvarla
- Acilepis thwaitesii (C.B.Clarke) H.Rob. & Skvarla
- Acilepis tonkinensis (Gagnep.) H.Rob. & Skvarla
- Acilepis virgata (Gagnep.) H.Rob. & Skvarla

formerly included

numerous species now considered members of other genera: Dicoma Pacourina

- Acilepis cirsiifolia - Pacourina edulis
- Acilepis lanata - Dicoma tomentosa
