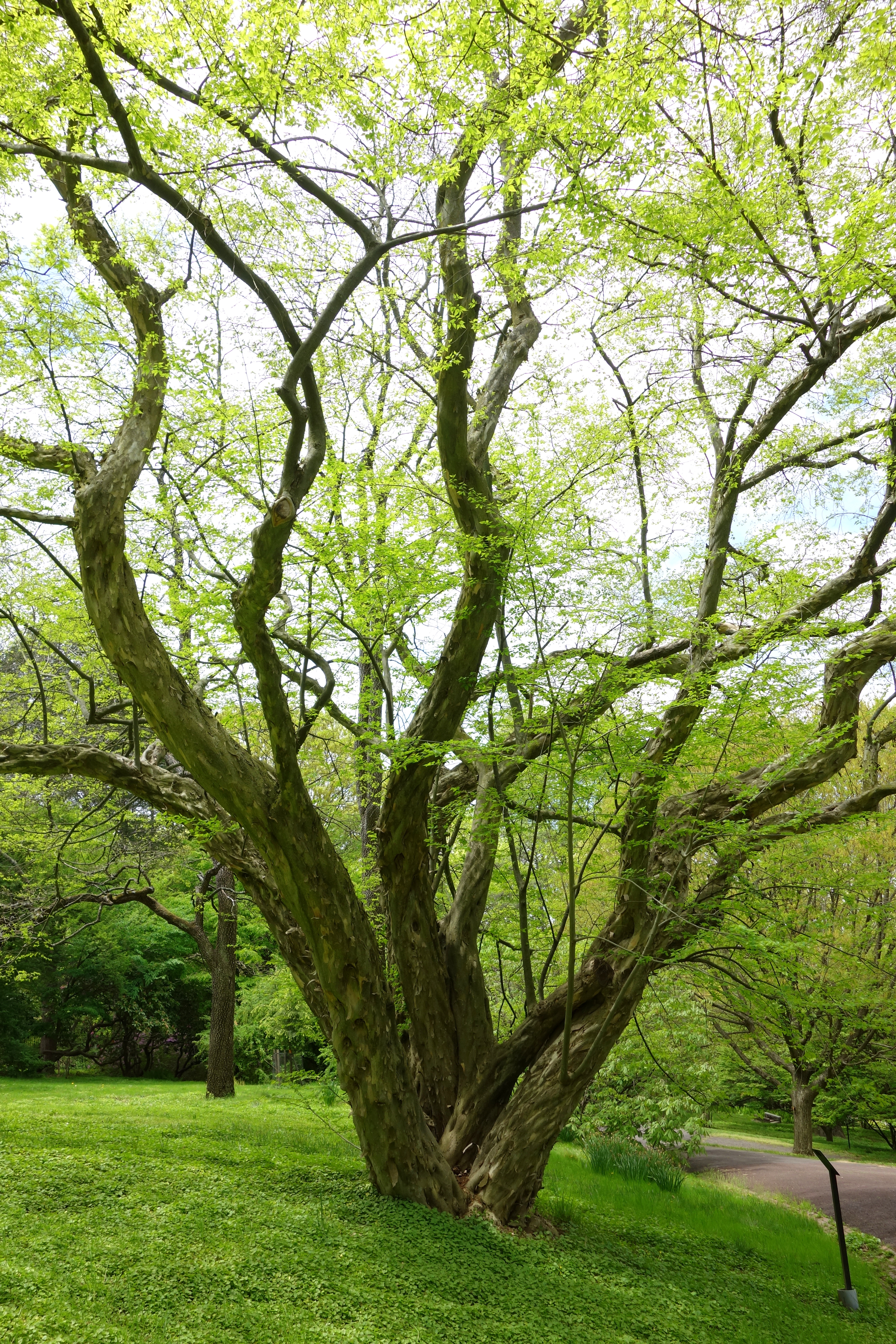

Scientific classification
- Kingdom: Plantae
- Clade: Embryophytes
- Clade: Tracheophytes
- Clade: Spermatophytes
- Clade: Angiosperms
- Clade: Eudicots
- Clade: Rosids
- Order: Rosales
- Family: Cannabaceae
- Genus: Pteroceltis
- Species: P. tatarinowii

Binomial name
- Pteroceltis tatarinowii Maxim.

= Pteroceltis tatarinowii =

Species of flowering plant

Pteroceltis tatarinowii a species of tree endemic to China and the only extant member of the genus Pteroceltis. Common names include blue sandalwood, wingceltis, Tatar-wingceltis or qing tan (Chinese: 青檀; pinyin: qīngtán). Trees grow to 20 m (66 ft) tall and are used for timber, the bark fiber to make Xuan paper, and oil is extracted from its seeds. Seeds were collected and brought to America by Frank Meyer and given to the USDA in 1907. One of those seeds grew into a mature tree at the Morris Arboretum outside of Philadelphia, Pennsylvania.

== Gallery ==
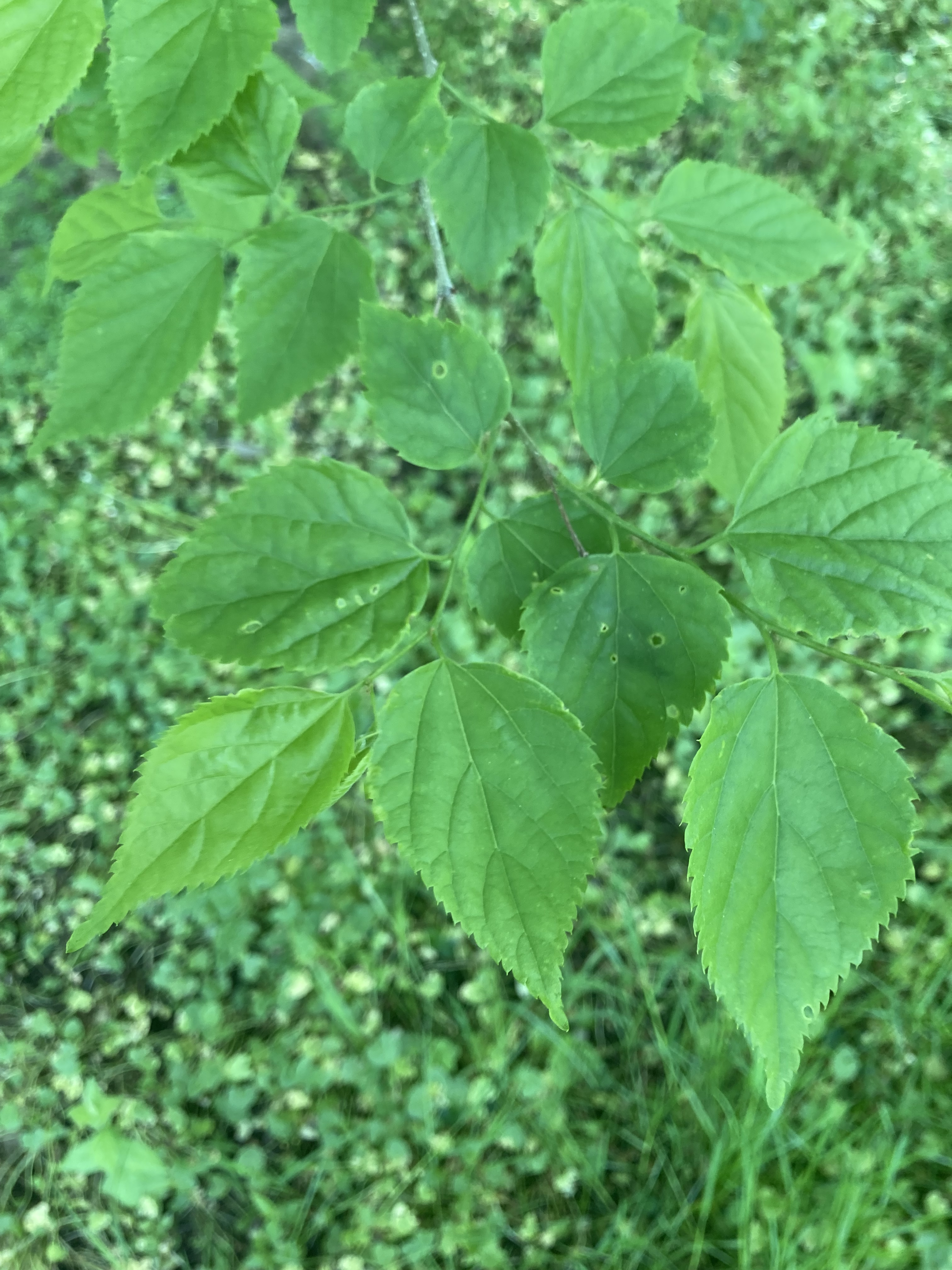
Leaf detail

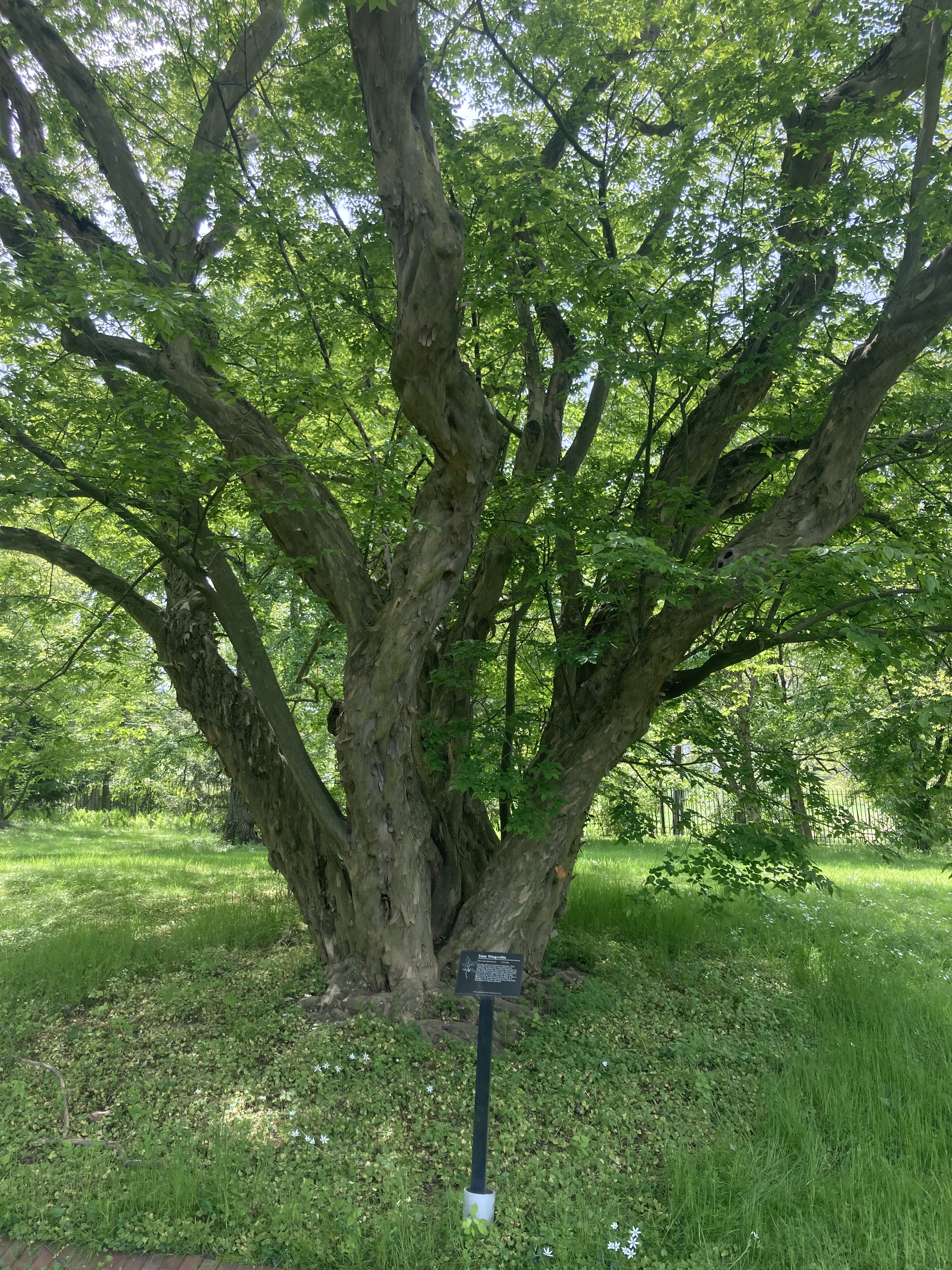
Another view of the specimen at the Morris Arboretum

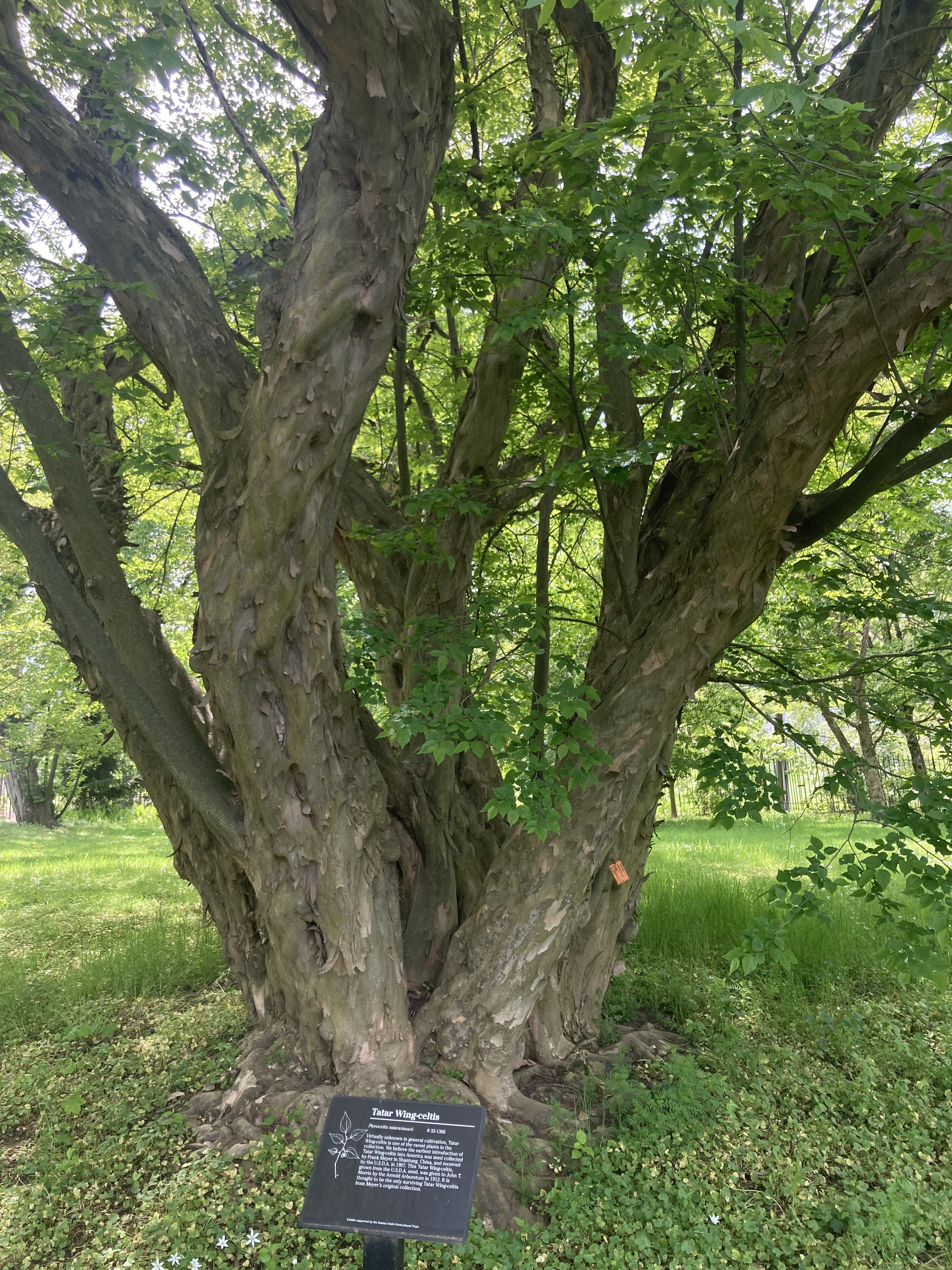
A close-up including the sign with history of the tree

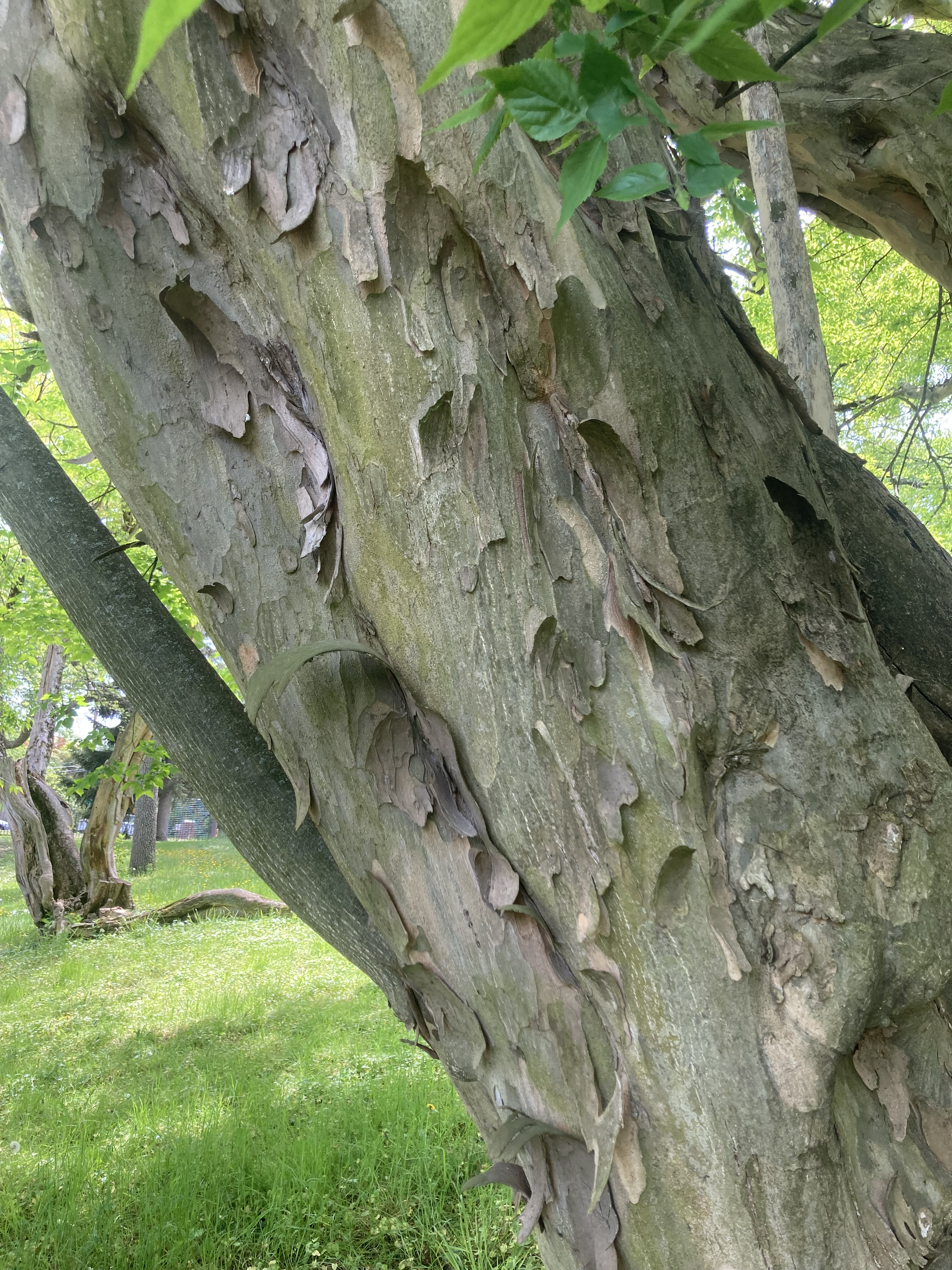
Bark detail
