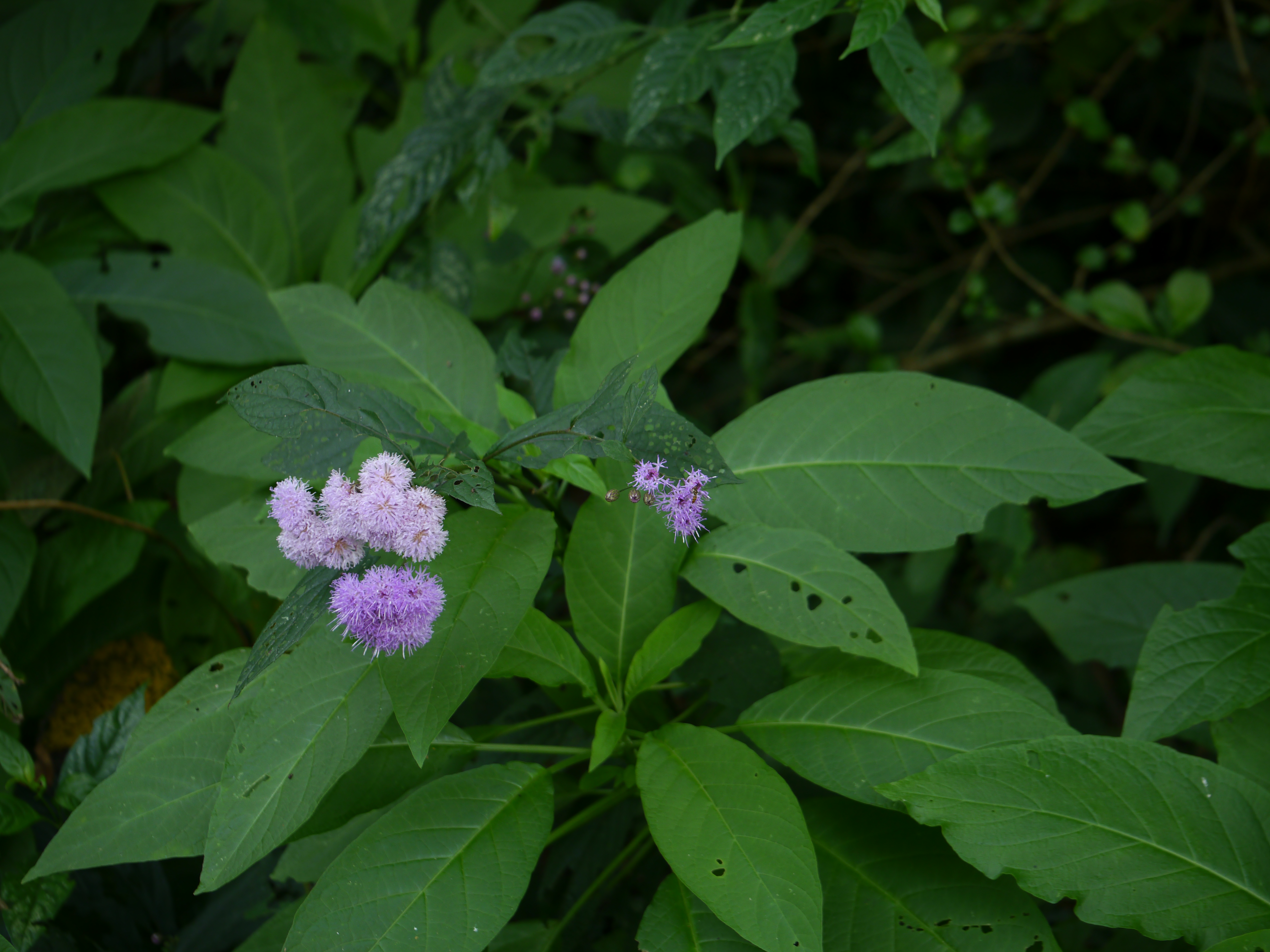

Scientific classification
- Kingdom: Plantae
- Clade: Tracheophytes
- Clade: Angiosperms
- Clade: Eudicots
- Clade: Asterids
- Order: Asterales
- Family: Asteraceae
- Genus: Acilepis
- Species: A. ornata

Binomial name
- Acilepis ornata (Talbot) H.Rob. & Skvarla

Synonyms
- Acilepis dalzelliana (J.R.Drumm. & Hutch.) H.Rob.; Vernonia dalzelliana J.R.Drumm. & Hutch.; Vernonia ornata Talbot

= Acilepis ornata =

Species of plant

Acilepis ornata is a species of plant native to India. The species was first described by William Alexander Talbot in 1898 as Vernonia ornata. (It is not the same species as Vernonia ornata S.Moore.)
