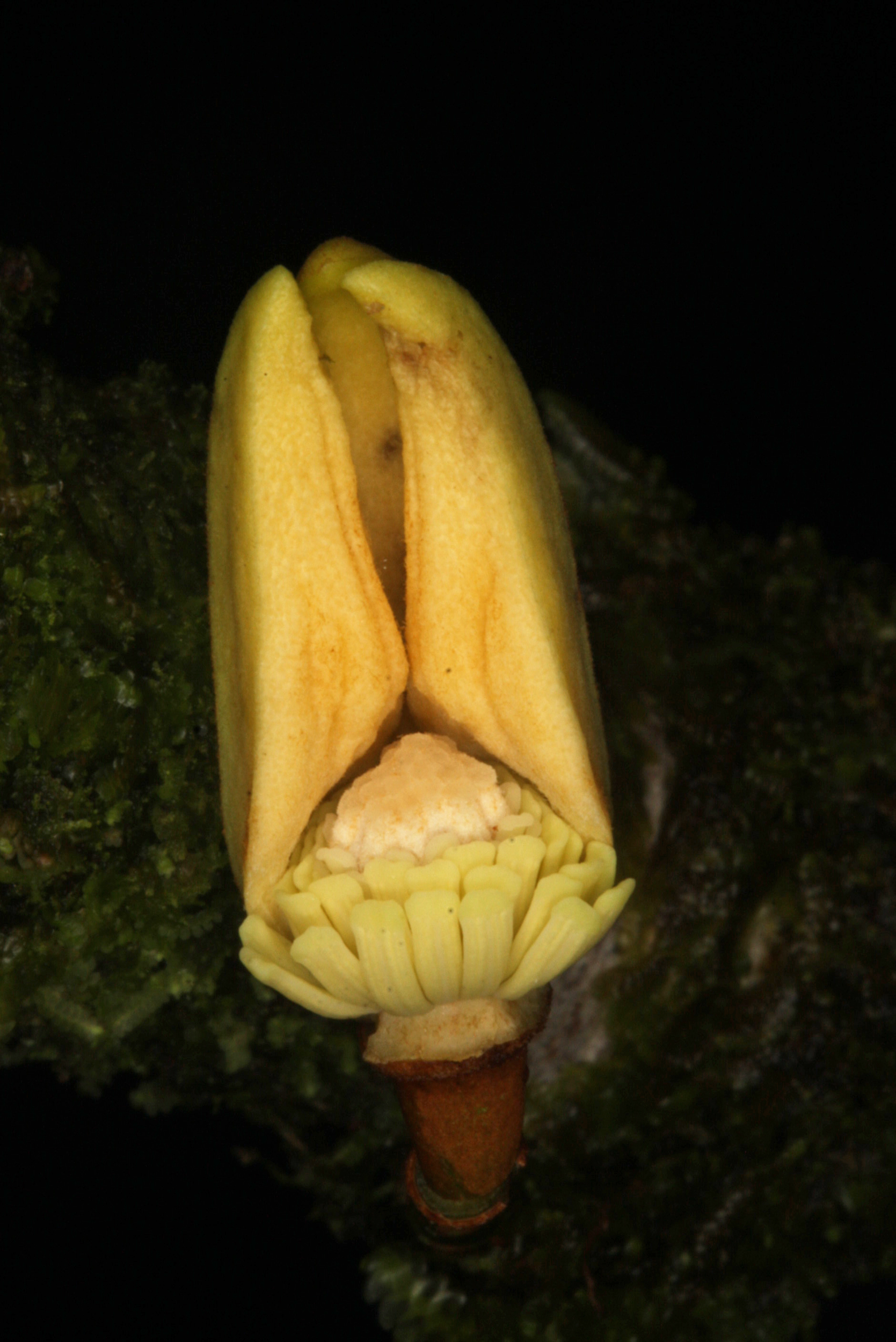

Conservation status
- Least Concern (IUCN 3.1)

Scientific classification
- Kingdom: Plantae
- Clade: Tracheophytes
- Clade: Angiosperms
- Clade: Magnoliids
- Order: Magnoliales
- Family: Annonaceae
- Genus: Anaxagorea
- Species: A. phaeocarpa

Binomial name
- Anaxagorea phaeocarpa Mart.

Synonyms
- Anaxagorea costaricensis R.E.Fr.

= Anaxagorea phaeocarpa =

Species of flowering plant

Anaxagorea phaeocarpa is a species of plant in the family Annonaceae. It is found in Costa Rica and Honduras.
