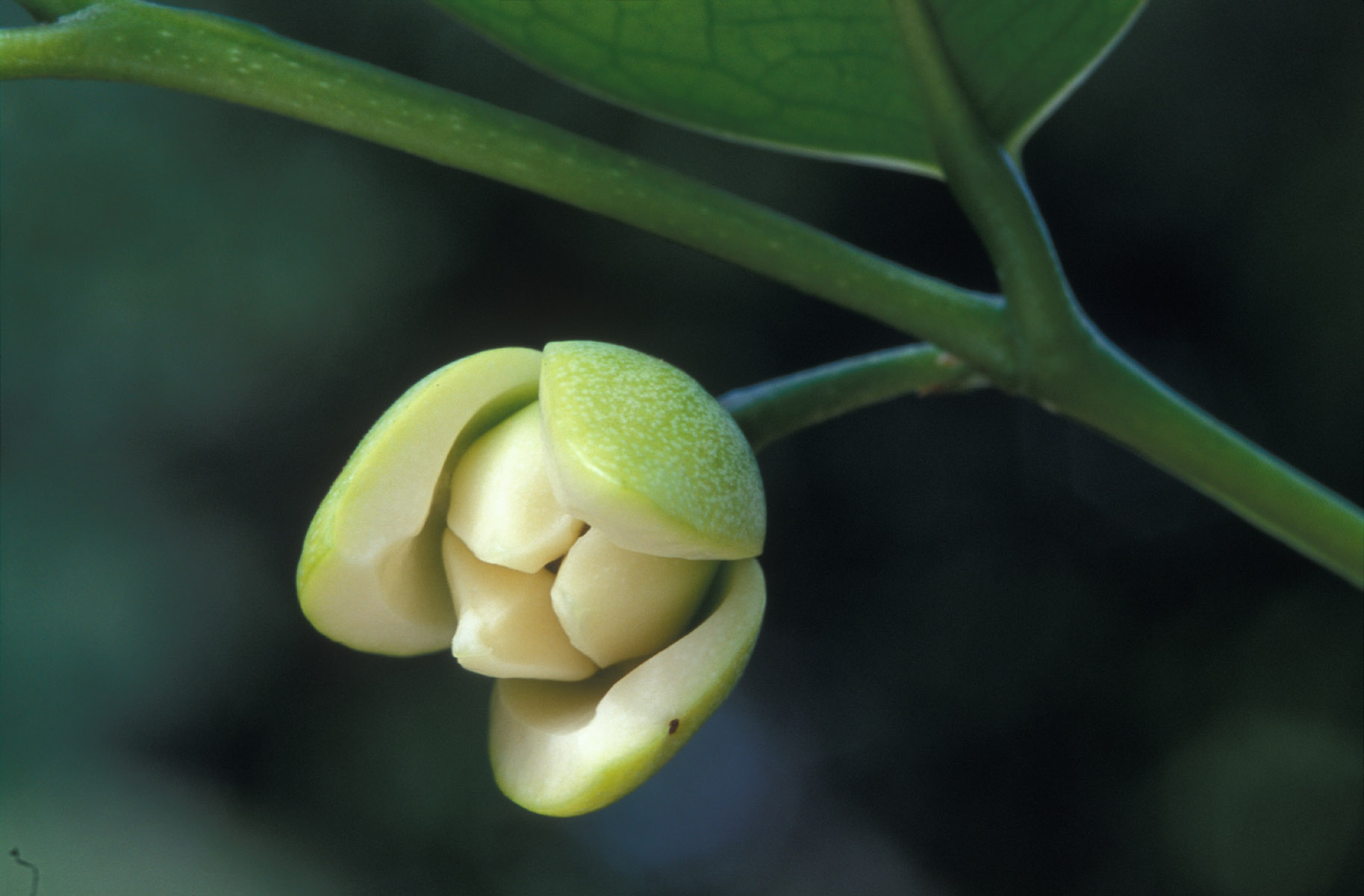

Conservation status
- Least Concern (IUCN 3.1)

Scientific classification
- Kingdom: Plantae
- Clade: Embryophytes
- Clade: Tracheophytes
- Clade: Spermatophytes
- Clade: Angiosperms
- Clade: Magnoliids
- Order: Magnoliales
- Family: Annonaceae
- Genus: Anaxagorea
- Species: A. javanica

Binomial name
- Anaxagorea javanica Blume

Varieties
- Anaxagorea javanica var. dipetala Corner; Anaxagorea javanica var. javanica; Anaxagorea javanica var. tripetala Corner

Synonyms
- Xylopia javanica (Blume) Steud.

= Anaxagorea javanica =

Species of plant

Anaxagorea javanica is a rainforest plant belonging to the family Annonaceae. It is a shrub or tree native to the Andaman Islands, Nicobar Islands, Myanmar, Thailand, Peninsular Malaysia, Sumatra, Java, Borneo, and the Philippines. According to David Mabberley, it has fruit which scatter its seeds by exploding. Mabberley does not discuss the nature of the explosion.

Three varieties are accepted.

- Anaxagorea javanica var. dipetala Corner
- Anaxagorea javanica var. javanica
- Anaxagorea javanica var. tripetala Corner
