= Anaxagorea crassipetala =

Conservation status
- Least Concern (IUCN 3.1)

Scientific classification
- Kingdom: Plantae
- Clade: Embryophytes
- Clade: Tracheophytes
- Clade: Spermatophytes
- Clade: Angiosperms
- Clade: Magnoliids
- Order: Magnoliales
- Family: Annonaceae
- Genus: Anaxagorea
- Species: A. crassipetala

Binomial name
- Anaxagorea crassipetala Hemsl.

Synonyms
- Anaxagorea clavata R.E.Fr.

Species of flowering plant

Anaxagorea crassipetala is a species of understory tree in the family Annonaceae. It is found frequently in the lowland rainforests of Costa Rica and Panama, but extends down to Peru.
