= Omphalophloios =

- Omphalophloios fossil at the Mining and Carboniferous Museum in Puertollano, Spain

Scientific classification
- Kingdom: Plantae
- Division: Lycopodiophyta
- Class: Isoetopsida
- Order: Isoetales
- Genus: Omphalophloios White, 1898

Extinct genus of free-sporing vascular plants in the order Isoetales

Omphalophloios is a genus of fossil lycopsid trees in the Carboniferous system.
