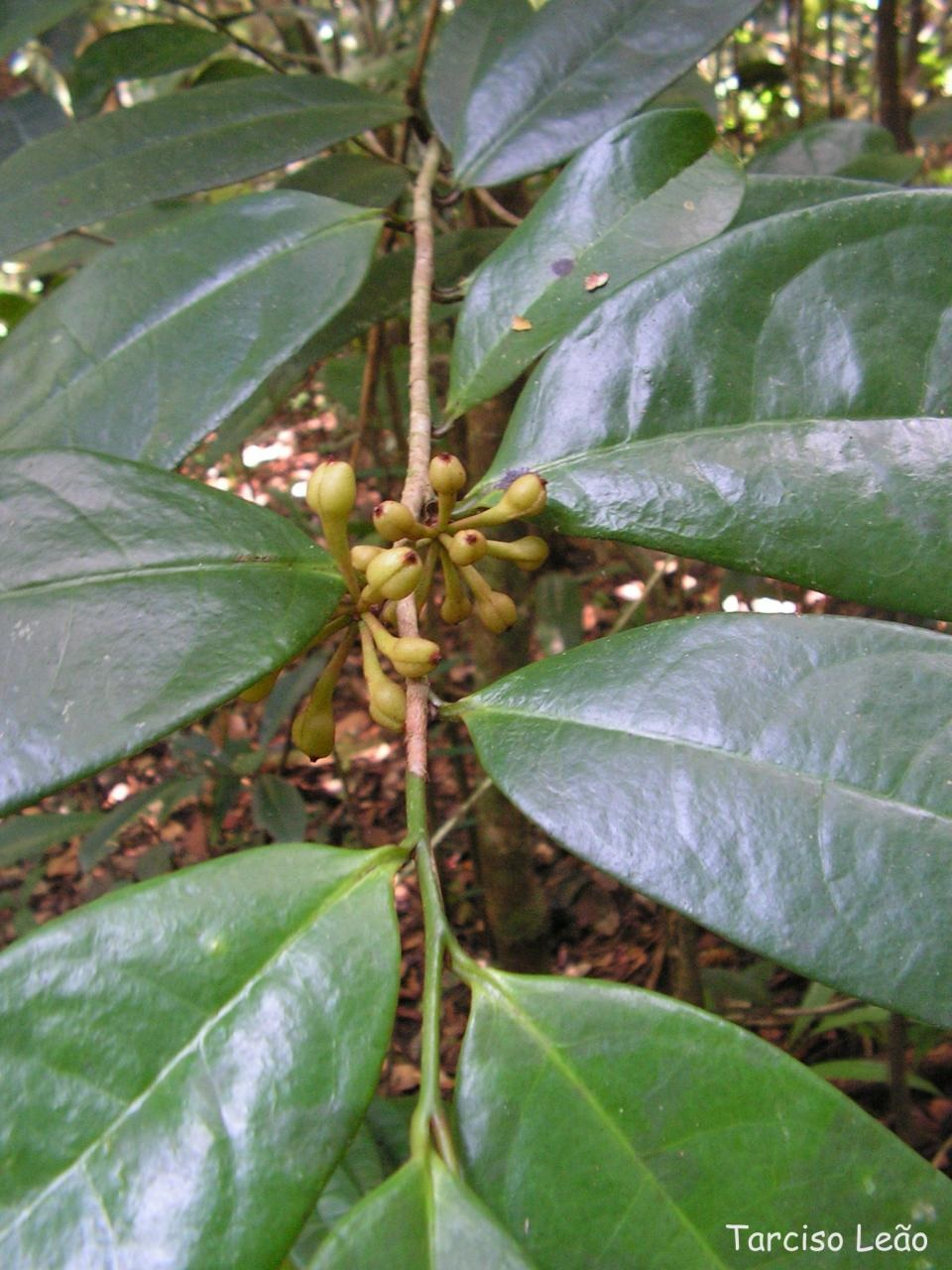
- Anaxagorea dolichocarpa

Scientific classification
- Kingdom: Plantae
- Clade: Tracheophytes
- Clade: Angiosperms
- Clade: Magnoliids
- Order: Magnoliales
- Family: Annonaceae
- Genus: Anaxagorea; A.St.-Hil.

= Anaxagorea =

Genus of flowering plants

Anaxagorea is a genus of flowering plants in the subfamily Anaxagoreoideae (of which it is the only genus) in the family Annonaceae. There are about 26 species, distributed in Central and South America.

Species include:

- Anaxagorea acuminata
- Anaxagorea allenii
- Anaxagorea angustifolia
- Anaxagorea borneensis (Becc.) J.Sinclair
- Anaxagorea brachycarpa
- Anaxagorea brevipedicellata
- Anaxagorea brevipes
- Anaxagorea crassipetala
- Anaxagorea dolichocarpa
- Anaxagorea floribunda
- Anaxagorea gigantophylla
- Anaxagorea guatemalensis
- Anaxagorea inundata
- Anaxagorea javanica
- Anaxagorea luzonensis
- Anaxagorea macrantha
- Anaxagorea manausensis
- Anaxagorea pachypetala
- Anaxagorea panamensis
- Anaxagorea petiolata
- Anaxagorea phaeocarpa, Mart.
- Anaxagorea prinoides
- Anaxagorea radiata
- Anaxagorea rheophytica
- Anaxagorea rufa
- Anaxagorea silvatica

A. radiata is a little-known species that may belong within A. javanica.
