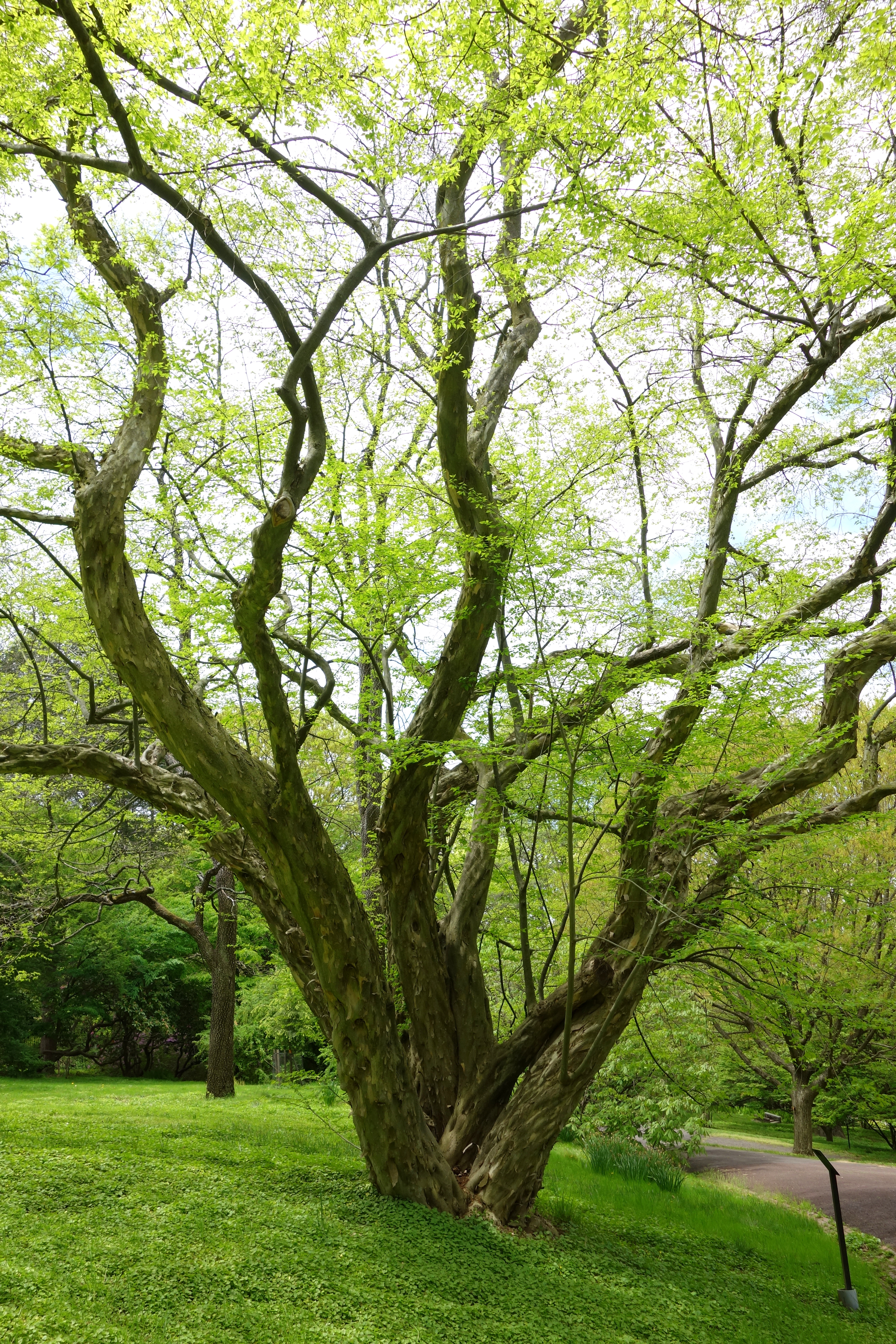
- Pteroceltis tatarinowii at the Morris Arboretum

Scientific classification
- Kingdom: Plantae
- Clade: Embryophytes
- Clade: Tracheophytes
- Clade: Spermatophytes
- Clade: Angiosperms
- Clade: Eudicots
- Clade: Rosids
- Order: Rosales
- Family: Cannabaceae
- Genus: Pteroceltis; Maxim.

Species
- †Pterocarya ezoana; †Pteroceltis knowltoni; †Pteroceltis kungshimensis; †Pteroceltis shanwangensis; †Pteroceltis taoae; Pteroceltis tatarinowii; †Pteroceltis tertiaria

= Pteroceltis =

Pteroceltis Temporal range: Ypresian - Recent

Genus of flowering plants

Pteroceltis is a genus of small trees in the family Cannabaceae and containing the living species Pteroceltis tatarinowii. The genus is now restricted to an endemic range in China and Mongolia. The genus has a fossil record which includes species described from Korea, Japan, Germany, and the United States.

The fossil record includes one described species from North America, †Pteroceltis knowltoni from the Middle Eocene Cockfield Formation in Tennessee, while an undescribed species is known from the Klondike Mountain Formation of Washington. One late Oligocene species †Pteroceltis tertiaria has been described from strata near Rott, Germany. The largest diversity of fossils are from Asia, with †Pteroceltis shanwangensis from the Miocene Shanwang flora in China, the Abura flora of Japan preserved †Pterocarya ezoana, and both †Pteroceltis taoae plus †Pteroceltis kungshimensis known from the Miocene Hoengyeong Formation in North Korea.
