= El Bosque Formation =

Geologic formation in Mexico

- Stratigraphic range: Paleogene
- Type: Formation

Location
- Country: Mexico

The El Bosque Formation is a geologic formation in Mexico. It preserves fossils of plants, vertebrates, invertebrates and calcareous algae dating back to the Eocene period.

== See also ==
- List of fossiliferous stratigraphic units in Mexico
