= Arcoa =

Scientific classification
- Kingdom: Plantae
- Clade: Tracheophytes
- Clade: Angiosperms
- Clade: Eudicots
- Clade: Rosids
- Order: Fabales
- Family: Fabaceae
- Subfamily: Caesalpinioideae
- Genus: Arcoa; Urb.
- Species: A. gonavensis

Binomial name
- Arcoa gonavensis Urb.

Genus of legumes

Arcoa is a genus of flowering plants in the family Fabaceae. It belongs to the subfamily Caesalpinioideae. Arcoa is monotypic, with the single species Arcoa gonavensis, a shrub or tree endemic to Hispaniola.
