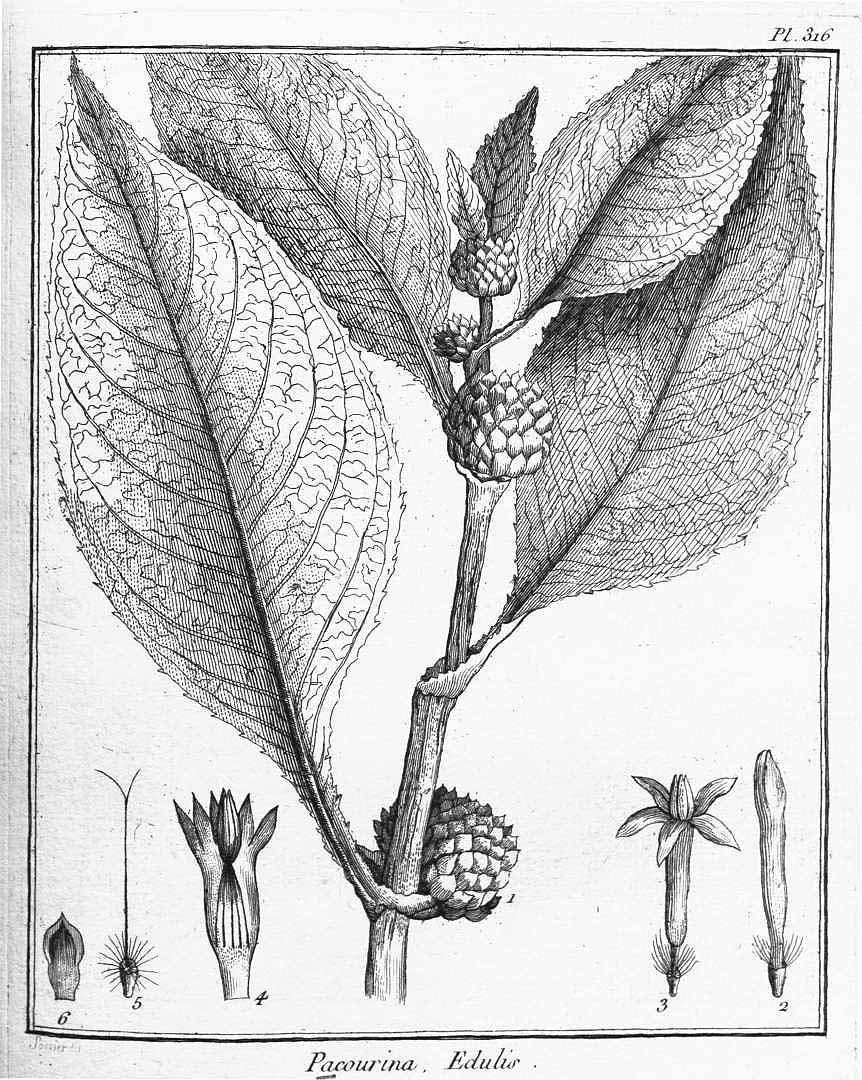

Scientific classification
- Kingdom: Plantae
- Clade: Tracheophytes
- Clade: Angiosperms
- Clade: Eudicots
- Clade: Asterids
- Order: Asterales
- Family: Asteraceae
- Subfamily: Vernonioideae
- Tribe: Vernonieae
- Genus: Pacourina; Aubl.
- Species: P. edulis

Binomial name
- Pacourina edulis Aubl.

Synonyms
- Pacourinopsis Cass.; Meisteria Scop.; Haynea Willd.; Vernonia edulis (Aubl.) Steud.; Calea sessiliflora Stokes; Pacourina cirsiifolia Kunth; Haynea edulis (Aubl.) Willd.; Acilepis cirsiifolia Spreng.; Pacourinopsis integrifolia Cass.; Pacourinopsis dentata Cass.; Pacourina edulis var. spinosissima Britton; Vernonia cirsiifolia Steud.

= Pacourina =

Genus of flowering plants

Pacourina is a genus of South American flowering plants in the tribe Vernonieae within the family Asteraceae. The only known species is Pacourina edulis, widespread across tropical America from Guatemala to French Guiana to Paraguay.
