= 2024 in paleobotany =

This paleobotany list records new fossil plant taxa that were described during the year 2024, and notes other significant paleobotany discoveries and events which occurred during 2024.

== Algae ==
=== Charophytes ===
Name	Novelty	Status	Authors	Age	Unit	Location	Synonymized taxa	Notes	Images
Echinochara pontis	Sp. nov		Pérez-Cano & Martín-Closas	Early Cretaceous (Berriasian)	Els Mangraners Formation	Spain		A member of the family Clavatoraceae.	

=== Chlorophytes ===
Name	Novelty	Status	Authors	Age	Unit	Location	Synonymized taxa	Notes	Images
Acicularia claudiopolitana	Sp. nov	Valid	Bucur et al.	Triassic		Romania		A species of Acicularia.	
Bediaella	Gen. et sp. nov		Ernst, Vachard & Rodríguez	Devonian (Pragian)		Spain		A probable member of Dasycladales. The type species is B. hispanica.	
Clypeina? pamelareidae	Sp. nov	Valid	Bucur, Del Piero & Martini	Late Triassic (Norian)		Canada (Yukon)		A member of Dasycladales.	
Griphoporella? speleoluka	Sp. nov	Valid	Grgasović	Middle Triassic (Anisian)		Croatia		A member of Dasycladales belonging to the family Triploporellaceae.	
Harpericystis	Gen. et sp. nov		Krings	Devonian	Rhynie chert	United Kingdom		A probable member of Chlorophyta. The type species is H. verecunda.	
Jimaodanus	Nom. nov		Pu	Silurian (Llandovery)	Waukesha Lagerstätte	United States (Wisconsin)		A dasycladalean alga; a replacement name for Heterocladus LoDuca, Kluessendorf & Mikulic (2003).	
Julpiaella baltresi	Sp. nov	Valid	Bucur et al.	Triassic		Romania		A member of Dasycladales.	
Palaeodasycladus primus	Sp. nov	Valid	Grgasović	Middle Triassic (Anisian)		Croatia		A member of Dasycladales belonging to the family Dasycladaceae.	
Pseudodiplopora ioanaletitiae	Sp. nov	Valid	Bucur et al.	Triassic		Romania		A member of Dasycladales.	

=== Ochrophytes ===
Name	Novelty	Status	Authors	Age	Type locality	Location	Notes	Images
Houjiashania	Gen. et sp. nov	Valid	Liu et al.	Ediacaran	Dengying Formation	China	A possible brown alga. The type species is H. yuxiensis. Announced in 2023; the final version of the article naming it was published in 2024.	
Mallomonas enigmata	Sp. nov		Siver	Eocene		Canada (Northwest Territories)	A species of Mallomonas.	
Mallomonas gigantica	Sp. nov	In press	Siver	Eocene		Canada (Northwest Territories)	A species of Mallomonas.	

=== Rhodophyta ===
Name	Novelty	Status	Authors	Age	Type locality	Location	Notes	Images
Amphiroa dabbabensis	Sp. nov		Hamad	Pliocene	Shagra Formation	Egypt	A species of Amphiroa.	

=== Other algae ===
Name	Novelty	Status	Authors	Age	Type locality	Location	Notes	Images
Characrhynium	Gen. et sp. nov		Krings	Devonian	Windyfield chert	United Kingdom	A probable unicellular alga. Genus includes new species C. amoenum.	
Yunnanospirellus	Gen. et 2 sp. nov		Li et al.	Ediacaran and Cambrian		China	A macroalga known from the Ediacaran Miaohe biota and from the Cambrian Chengjiang biota. The type species is Y. typica; genus also includes Y. elegans.	

==== Phycological research ====
- Evidence from genomic data, interpreted as indicating that the brown algae originated during the Ordovician but their major diversification happened during the Mesozoic, is presented by Choi et al. (2024).
- Kiel et al. (2024) report the discovery of kelp holdfasts from the Oligocene strata in Washington State (United States), providing evidence of the presence of kelp in the northeastern Pacific Ocean since the earliest Oligocene.
- Putative dasycladalean alga Voronocladus dryganti from the Silurian of Ukraine is argued by LoDuca (2024) to be a member of Bryopsidales; the author also reinterprets purported graptolite-like epibionts of V. dryganti, originally described as the new taxon Podoliagraptus algaeoides, as actually representing the uppermost siphons of mature thalli of V. dryganti.
- A diverse charophyte flora, including fossil material of Echinochara cf. peckii representing the oldest record of the family Clavatoraceae reported to date, is described from the Middle Jurassic (Bathonian) marginal marine beds of southern France by Trabelsi, Sames & Martín-Closas (2024).

== Non-vascular plants ==
=== Bryophyta ===
Name	Novelty	Status	Authors	Age	Unit	Location	Synonymized taxa	Notes	Images
Jamesrossia	Gen. et sp. nov	Valid	Walker et al.	Late Cretaceous (Campanian)	Santa Marta Formation	Antarctica		A moss belonging to the family Rhabdoweisiaceae. The type species is J. plicata.	
Servicktia tatyanae	Sp. nov		Ignatov in Ignatov et al.	Permian (Lopingian)		Russia (Vologda Oblast)		A moss belonging to the group Protosphagnales.	
Tricosta angeiophoros	Sp. nov	Valid	Valois et al.	Early Cretaceous (Valanginian)		Canada (British Columbia)		A moss belonging to the family Tricostaceae. Published online in 2024; the final version of the article naming it was published in 2025.	

=== Marchantiophyta ===
Name	Novelty	Status	Authors	Age	Unit	Location	Synonymized taxa	Notes	Images
Frullania delgadillii	Sp. nov		Juárez-Martínez & Estrada-Ruiz in Juárez-Martínez, Córdova-Tabares & Estrada-Ruiz	Miocene	Mexican amber	Mexico		A liverwort, a species of Frullania.	
Jubula polessica	Sp. nov	Valid	Mamontov, Atwood & Perkovsky in Mamontov et al.	Eocene	Rovno amber	Ukraine		A liverwort, a species of Jubula.	
Lejeunea aristovii	Sp. nov	Valid	Schäfer-Verwimp, Mamontov, Feldberg & Perkovsky in Mamontov et al.	Eocene	Rovno amber	Ukraine		A liverwort, a species of Lejeunea.	
Leptoscyphus davidii	Sp. nov	Valid	Mamontov et al.	Eocene	Rovno amber	Ukraine		A liverwort, a species of Leptoscyphus.	
Nipponolejeunea rovnoi	Sp. nov		Mamontov et al.	Eocene	Rovno amber	Ukraine		A liverwort.	
Nipponolejeunea solodovnikovii	Sp. nov		Mamontov et al.	Eocene	Rovno amber	Ukraine		A liverwort.	
Radula tikhomirovae	Sp. nov	Valid	Mamontov & Perkovsky in Mamontov et al.	Eocene	Rovno amber	Ukraine		A liverwort, a species of Radula.	

=== Non-vascular plant research ===
- Ignatov et al. (2024) describe new fossil material of the Permian moss Gomankovia from the Aristovo locality (Vologda Oblast, Russia), providing new information on its anatomy.

== Lycophytes ==
Name	Novelty	Status	Authors	Age	Unit	Location	Synonymized taxa	Notes	Images
Bisigillariostrobus	Gen. et sp. nov		Asghar et al.	Permian		China		A member of Lepidodendrales belonging to the family Sigillariaceae. Genus includes new species B. prolificus.	
Heliodendron	Gen. et sp. nov	Junior homonym	Qin et al.	Devonian	Wutong Formation	China		A member of Isoetales belonging to the group Dichostrobiles. The type species is H. longshanense. The generic name is preoccupied by Heliodendron Gill.K.Br. & Bayly (2022).	
Lepidostrobus willardii	Sp. nov	Valid	Pšenička, Bek & Nelson	Carboniferous (Pennsylvanian)	Tradewater Formation	United States (Illinois)			
Selaginellites argentinensis	Sp. nov	Valid	Cariglino, Zavattieri & Lara	Triassic		Argentina		A member of the family Selaginellaceae.	
Staphylophyton	Gen. et sp. nov	Valid	Gensel et al.	Devonian (Emsian)		Canada (New Brunswick)		A zosterophyll. Genus includes new species S. semiglobosa. Published online in 2024; the final version of the article naming it was published in 2025.	

=== Lycophyte research ===
- Revision of the original material of Bumbudendron is published by Coturel (2024).
- Evidence of silica biomineralization in Permian spikemosses from the Xuanwei Formation (Yunnan, China) is presented by Feng et al. (2024).

== Ferns and fern allies ==
Name	Novelty	Status	Authors	Age	Unit	Location	Synonymized taxa	Notes	Images
Acitheca machadoi	Sp. nov		Correia et al.	Carboniferous (Gzhelian)	Monsarros Formation	Portugal		A member of the family Psaroniaceae.	
Adiantum qaidamense	Sp. nov		Chen & Yan in Chen et al.	Oligocene	Shangganchaigou Formation	China		A species of Adiantum.	
Arthropitys raimundii	Sp. nov	Valid	Rößler et al.	Permian	Leukersdorf Formation	Germany		A calamitalean. Published online in 2024; the final version of the article naming it was published in 2025.	
Artisophyton chalmersii	Comb. nov	Valid	(Goodlet)	Carboniferous (Serpukhovian)	Limestone Coal Formation	United Kingdom		A member of the family Tedeleaceae; moved from "Megaphyton" chalmersii Goodlet (1957).	
Bussacoconus	Gen. et sp. nov		Correia & Sá	Carboniferous (Pennsylvanian)	Vale da Mó Formation	Portugal		A member of Sphenophyllales. Genus includes new species B. zeliapereirae.	
Cyathocarpus benefoliatii	Sp. nov		Guo, Zhou & Feng in Guo et al.	Permian (Lopingian)	Xuanwei Formation	China		A marattialean fern.	
Cystodium parasorbifolium	Sp. nov		Li & Moran in Guo et al.	Cretaceous	Burmese amber	Myanmar		A member of the family Cystodiaceae.	
Equicalastrobus glabratus	Sp. nov	Valid	Procopio Rodríguez, Bodnar & Beltrán	Middle Triassic (Ladinian)	Cortaderita Formation	Argentina		A member of the family Equisetaceae.	
Henanotheca qingyunensis	Sp. nov	Valid	Guo, Zhou & Feng in Guo et al.	Permian (Lopingian)	Xuanwei Formation	China		A filicalean fern.	
Hexaphyllostrobus	Gen. et sp. nov		D'Antonio et al.	Carboniferous	Mazon Creek fossil beds	United States (Illinois)		A member of Sphenophyllales. Genus includes new species H. kostorhysii.	
Jerana	Gen. et sp. nov		Meyer-Berthaud et al.	Devonian (Givetian)		Morocco		A member of Cladoxylopsida. Genus includes new species J. modica.	
Neocalamites vanderburghii	Sp. nov		Kuipers, van Konijnenburg-van Cittert & Wagner-Cremer	Middle Triassic (Anisian)		Germany		A member of Equisetales.	
Palaeosorum siwalikum	Sp. nov	Valid	Kundu, Hazra & Khan in Kundu et al.	Miocene		India		A member of the family Polypodiaceae. Announced in 2023; the final version of the article naming it was published in 2024.	
Paracladoxylon	Gen. et sp. nov		Chu & Tomescu in Chu, Durieux & Tomescu	Devonian (Emsian)	Battery Point Formation	Canada (Quebec)		A member of Cladoxylopsida. Genus includes new species P. kespekianum.	
Pecluma hispaniolae	Sp. nov		Regalado & Schmidt in Regalado et al.	Miocene	Dominican amber	Dominican Republic		A species of Pecluma.	
Scolecopteris oxydonta	Sp. nov		Sun et al.	Permian	Taiyuan Formation	China		A marattialean fern.	
Tempskya hailunensis	Sp. nov		Liu et al.	Cretaceous	Songliao Basin	China			

=== Pteridological research ===
- Yang et al. (2024) revise fossil material of Bowmanites described by Halle (1927) from Permian Shihottse Formation (China).
- Wang et al. (2024) report the discovery of a fossil forest of Neocalamites plants from the Middle Triassic Yanchang Formation (China), and interpret this finding as evidence of wide-scale intensification of the water cycle during the Triassic prior to the Carnian pluvial episode.
- Wu et al. (2024) reconstruct fronds of Pecopteris lativenosa on the basis of fossils from the Permian Wuda Tuff flora (China).
- Jia et al. (2024) describe fossil material of Cladophlebis kwangyuanensis from the Xujiahe Formation (Chongqing, China), expanding known geographical range of the species, and interpret the studied specimens as living in warm, humid subtropical-tropical monsoon climate during the Late Triassic.
- A study on the phylogenetic relationships of fossil members of Osmundales is published by Urrea, Yañez & Flores (2024).
- Evidence from the study of an almost monospecific assemblage of fossils of Ruffordia goeppertii from the Albian strata from the Los Majuelos fossil site (Teruel, Spain), indicative of colonization of disturbed deltaic floodplains by the studied ferns, is presented by Sender et al. (2024).
- The classification of Microlepia burmasia from the Cretaceous amber from Myanmar as a dennstaedtiaceous fern belonging to the genus Microlepia is contested by Zhang (2024).
- A study on the phylogenetic relationships of extant and fossil members of Cyatheales, and on the biogeography of the group throughout its evolutionary history, is published by Ramírez-Barahona (2024).
- Machado et al. (2024) describe fossil material of Pteridium sp. cf. P. esculentum from the Miocene Ñirihuau Formation (Argentina) representing the oldest and southernmost record of Pteridium from South America reported to date.
- Evidence from the study of extant and fossil fern (including a tetrahedral apical cell in the leaf meristem of Ankyropteris corrugata), interpreted as indicating that fiddleheads are a synapomorphy of marattioid and leptosporangiate ferns and that fern leaves evolved from shoots, is presented by Cruz & Hetherington (2024).

== Bennettitales ==
Name	Novelty	Status	Authors	Age	Unit	Location	Synonymized taxa	Notes	Images
Otozamites meyenii	Sp. nov	Valid	Bazhenova & Bazhenov	Middle Jurassic		Russia (Kursk Oblast)			
Weltrichia huitzilopochtlii	Comb. nov		(Wieland)	Early Jurassic (Toarcian)	Rosario Formation	Mexico		A member of Bennettitales. Moved from Williamsonia huitzilopochtli Wieland.	
Williamsoniella rosarensis	Sp. nov		Velasco de León et al.	Early-Middle Jurassic	Cualac Formation	Mexico		A member of Bennettitales belonging to the family Williamsoniaceae.	

== Conifers ==
=== Araucariaceae ===
Name	Novelty	Status	Authors	Age	Unit	Location	Synonymized taxa	Notes	Images
Agathoxylon pluriresinosum	Comb. nov	Valid	(Torres & Biro-Bagoczky)	Paleocene (Danian)	Sobral Formation	Antarctica		Moved from Araucarioxylon pluriresinosum Torres & Biro-Bagoczky (1986).	
Araucaria timkarikensis	Sp. nov		Slodownik	Eocene		Australia		A species of Araucaria.	

=== Cheirolepidiaceae ===
Name	Novelty	Status	Authors	Age	Unit	Location	Synonymized taxa	Notes	Images
Classostrobus doylei	Sp. nov		Mendes et al.	Early Cretaceous	Figueira da Foz Formation	Portugal			
Classostrobus minutus	Sp. nov	Valid	Pfeiler, Matsunaga & Atkinson	Late Cretaceous (Campanian)	Ladd Formation	United States (California)		Published online in 2024; the final version of the article naming it was published in 2025.	
Frenelopsis callapezii	Sp. nov	Valid	Kvaček, Mendes & Van Konijnenburg-van Cittert	Early Cretaceous	Figueira da Foz Formation	Portugal		Published online in 2024; the final version of the article naming it was published in 2025.	

=== Cupressaceae ===
Name	Novelty	Status	Authors	Age	Unit	Location	Synonymized taxa	Notes	Images
Amurodendron	Gen. et sp. nov	Valid	Sokolova et al.	Paleocene		Russia (Amur Oblast)		A conifer with affinities with the family Cupressaceae. The type species is A. pilosum. Published online in 2024, but the issue date is listed as December 2023.	
Cunninghamia nakatonbetsuensis	Sp. nov	Valid	Jiang & Yamada in Jiang et al.	Late Cretaceous (Maastrichtian)	Heitaro-zawa Formation	Japan		A species of Cunninghamia.	
Cupressoxylon dianneae	Sp. nov	Valid	Vanner et al.	Cretaceous	Tupuangi Formation	New Zealand			

=== Pinaceae ===
Name	Novelty	Status	Authors	Age	Unit	Location	Synonymized taxa	Notes	Images
Keteleerioxylon shandongense	Sp. nov		Hao, Jiang, Tian & Wang in Hao et al.	Early Cretaceous	Zhifengzhuang Formation	China			
Onostrobus	Gen. et sp. nov	Valid	Rothwell & Stockey	Early Cretaceous (Aptian)	Budden Canyon Formation	United States (California)		The type species is O. elongatus.	
Paranothotsuga	Gen. et comb. nov	Valid	Kowalski in Kowalski et al.	Oligocene to Pliocene	Cottbus Formation	Germany		The type species is "Pseudotsuga" jechorekiae Czaja (2000).	
Pseudotsuga lesvosensis	Sp. nov		Zhu, Li, Wang & Zouros in Zhu et al.	Miocene	Sigri Pyroclastic Formation	Greece		A species of Pseudotsuga.	
Tsuga weichangensis	Sp. nov	In press	Li et al.	Miocene		China		A species of Tsuga. Announced in Feb 2023, formally published Jan 2024	

=== Podocarpaceae ===
Name	Novelty	Status	Authors	Age	Unit	Location	Synonymized taxa	Notes	Images
Podocarpus paralungatikensis	Sp. nov		Slodownik	Eocene		Australia		A species of Podocarpus.	
Protophyllocladoxylon jacobusii	Sp. nov	Valid	Vanner et al.	Cretaceous	Tupuangi Formation	New Zealand			

=== Taxaceae ===
Name	Novelty	Status	Authors	Age	Unit	Location	Synonymized taxa	Notes	Images
Torreya jiuquanensis	Sp. nov		Li & Du in Li et al.	Early Cretaceous (Aptian to Albian)	Jiuquan Basin	China		A species of Torreya.	

=== Voltziales ===
Name	Novelty	Status	Authors	Age	Unit	Location	Synonymized taxa	Notes	Images
Archaeovoltzia kuedensis	Sp. nov	Valid	Naugolnykh	Permian		Russia (Perm Krai)			

=== Other conifers ===
Name	Novelty	Status	Authors	Age	Unit	Location	Synonymized taxa	Notes	Images
Cratoxylon	Gen. et sp. nov		Conceição et al.	Early Cretaceous	Crato Formation	Brazil		A member of Pinidae of uncertain affinities. The type species is C. placidoi. The name is preoccupied by Cratoxylon Blume.	
Ferganiella ivantsovii	Sp. nov	Valid	Frolov & Mashchuk	Early Jurassic (Toarcian)	Prisayan Formation	Russia			
Leliacladus	Gen. et comb. nov	Valid	Batista & Kunzmann in Batista et al.	Early Cretaceous (Aptian)	Crato Formation	Brazil		A member of Cupressales of uncertain affinities. The type species is "Brachyphyllum" castilhoi Duarte (1985).	
Ourostrobus einbergensis	Sp. nov	Valid	Van Konijnenburg-van Cittert et al.	Late Triassic (Rhaetian)		Germany		A conifer cone.	
Shanxiopitys	Gen. et sp. nov	Valid	Shi et al.	Permian (Lopingian)	Sunjiagou Formation	China		A conifer wood. The type species is S. zhangziensis.	
Sphaerostrobus einbergensis	Sp. nov	Valid	Van Konijnenburg-van Cittert et al.	Late Triassic (Rhaetian)		Germany		A conifer cone.	

=== Conifer research ===
- Forte et al. (2024) study the morphology, cuticular patterns and isotope geochemistry of Permian (Lopingian) conifer fossils from the Bletterbach plant fossil assemblage (Italy), reporting evidence of a unique geochemical composition of fossils of Majonica alpina (possibly related to adaptation to specific environmental conditions), as well as evidence of isotopic differences between leaves and axes of the studied conifers.
- Decombeix, Hiller & Bomfleur (2024) describe a dwarf conifer tree from the Middle Triassic strata in Antarctica preserving evidence suppressed growth likely caused by stressful local site conditions in spite of overall favorable regional climate, representing the first finding of a tree with such suppressed growth in the fossil record reported to date.
- De Brito, Fischer & Prestianni (2024) redescribe Pinus belgica and confirm that it had diagnostic characteristics of the genus Pinus.
- Xie, Gee & Griebeler (2024) use growth models based on the height–diameter relationships of extant araucarians to determine heights of araucariaceous logs from the Upper Jurassic Morrison Formation (Utah, United States).
- Xie et al. (2024) interpret Xenoxylon as a likely relative of extant members of Podocarpaceae.
- Evidence of preservation of fragments of embryo, megagametophyte and nucellus (with nuclei preserved in their cells) in seeds of Alapaja cf. uralensis from the Cretaceous Simonovo Formation (Krasnoyarsk Krai, Russia) is presented by Torshilova et al. (2024), who also report two cases of preservation of aldehyde groups of deoxyribose in the studied fossil material.
- George et al. (2024) report the presence of fossil material of two juniper species (Juniperus californica and Juniperus scopulorum) in La Brea Tar Pits (California, United States), expanding known past range of J. scopulorum.

== Gnetophyta ==
Name	Novelty	Status	Authors	Age	Unit	Location	Synonymized taxa	Notes	Images
Laiyangia	Gen. et sp. nov		Jin in Jin et al.	Early Cretaceous (Hauterivian–Barremian)	Laiyang Formation	China		A member of the family Ephedraceae. The type species is L. compacta.	

== Flowering plants ==
=== Chloranthoids ===
Name	Novelty	Status	Authors	Age	Unit	Location	Synonymized taxa	Notes	Images
Asterostemon	Gen. et 2 sp. nov		Friis, Crane & Pedersen in Friis et al.	Early Cretaceous (Aptian–Albian)	Figueira da Foz Formation	Portugal		A chloranthoid flowering plant. The type species is A. hedlundii; genus also includes A. norrisii.	
Swamyflora	Gen. et sp. nov		Friis, Crane & Pedersen in Friis et al.	Early Cretaceous (Albian)	Potomac Group	United States (Virginia)		A chloranthoid flowering plant. The type species is S. alata.	
Wasmyflora	Gen. et sp. nov		Friis, Crane & Pedersen in Friis et al.	Early Cretaceous (Barremian–Aptian)	Vale de Água clay pit complex	Portugal		A chloranthoid flowering plant. The type species is W. portugallica.	

=== Magnoliids ===
Name	Novelty	Status	Authors	Age	Unit	Location	Synonymized taxa	Notes	Images
Cryptocarya latiradiata	Sp. nov		Zhang, Su & Oskolski in Zhang et al.	Miocene	Dajie Formation	China		A species of Cryptocarya.	
Daphnogene knowltonii	Comb. nov	Valid	(Meyer & Manchester)	Eocene and Oligocene	John Day Formation	United States (Oregon)		A member of Lauraceae; moved from Cinnamomophyllum knowltonii Meyer & Manchester (1997).	
Illigera berryi	Sp. nov		Zhu, Manchester & Lott	Miocene	Fort Preston Formation	United States (Florida)		A species of Illigera.	
Laurinoxylon patagonicum	Sp. nov		Pujana et al.	Eocene	Huitrera Formation	Argentina		A member of Lauraceae.	
Laurophyllum eocenicum	Comb. nov	Valid	(Brown)	Eocene	Green River Formation	United States		A member of Lauraceae; moved from Umbellularia eocenica Brown (1940).	
Magnolia dorotheae	Sp. nov	Valid	Kunzmann et al.	Eocene		Germany		A species of Magnolia. Published online in 2024; the final version of the article naming it was published in 2025.	
Magnolia germanica	Comb. nov	Valid	(Mai)	Oligocene to Miocene		Germany		A species of Magnolia; moved from Manglietia germanica Mai (1971).	
Pabiania enochii	Sp. nov		Rubalcava-Knoth & Cevallos-Ferriz	Late Cretaceous	Olmos Formation	Mexico		A member of Laurales.	
Polyalthia miolongifolia	Sp. nov	Valid	Singh et al.	Miocene	Middle Siwalik Group	India		A species of Polyalthia.	

==== Magnoliid research ====
- The first fossil record of a flower of a member of the genus Cryptocarya is reported from the Miocene Zhangpu amber (China) by Beurel et al. (2024).

=== Monocots ===
==== Arecales ====
Name	Novelty	Status	Authors	Age	Unit	Location	Synonymized taxa	Notes	Images
Cryosophiloxylon indicum	Sp. nov	Valid	Kumar & Khan	Cretaceous-Paleocene (Maastrichtian-Danian)	Deccan Intertrappean Beds	India		A member of the tribe Cryosophileae. Published online in 2023; the final version of the article naming it was published in 2024.	
Palmoxylon calamoides	Sp. nov		Kumar, Roy & Khan in Kumar et al.	Cretaceous-Paleocene (Maastrichtian-Danian)	Deccan Intertrappean Beds	India		Fossil wood of a member of the family Arecaceae and the subfamily Calamoideae.	
Palmoxylon coryphaoides	Sp. nov	Valid	Ali, Roy & Khan in Ali et al.	Cretaceous-Paleocene (Maastrichtian-Danian)	Deccan Intertrappean Beds	India		Fossil wood of a member of the family Arecaceae.	
Phoenicites insula-lacuna	Sp. nov		Greenwood & Conran	Cenozoic		Australia			
Sabalites siwalicus	Sp. nov	Valid	Mahato & Khan	Miocene	Chunabati Formation	India		Published online in 2024, but the issue date is listed as December 2023.	
Sabalites striatipetiolaphyllum	Sp. nov		Gao & Su in Gao et al.	Paleocene	Liuqu Formation	China			
Spinopinnophyllum	Gen. et sp. nov		Kumar, Su & Khan in Kumar et al.	Late Cretaceous (Maastrichtian)-Paleocene (Danian)	Deccan Intertrappean Beds	India		A member of the family Arecaceae. The type species is S. acanthorachis.	

==== Dioscoreales ====
Name	Novelty	Status	Authors	Age	Unit	Location	Synonymized taxa	Notes	Images
Dioscorea lindgrenii	Sp. nov	Valid	Herrera & Manchester	Eocene	Green River Formation; Fossil Butte Member	United States (Wyoming)		A species of Dioscorea.	
Dioscorea shermanii	Sp. nov	Valid	Herrera & Manchester	Eocene	Green River Formation; Fossil Butte Member	United States (Wyoming)		A species of Dioscorea.	

==== Liliales ====
Name	Novelty	Status	Authors	Age	Unit	Location	Synonymized taxa	Notes	Images
Smilax sphenophylla	Comb. nov	Valid	(Unger)	Miocene		Austria		A species of Smilax; moved from "Ilex" sphenophylla Unger (1847).	

==== Poales ====
Name	Novelty	Status	Authors	Age	Unit	Location	Synonymized taxa	Notes	Images
Sparganium tuberculatum	Sp. nov	Valid	Kowalski in Kowalski et al.	Miocene	Spremberg Formation	Germany		A species of Sparganium.	

==== Monocot research ====
- A study on the phytolith morphology of palms and on the utility of phytoliths for reconstructions of environment of fossils palms is published by Brightly et al. (2024), who find that phytoliths do not reliably differentiate most palm taxa, though they might be useful to determine the presence of more distinct (and possibly environmentally informative) members of the group in the fossil record.
- Fossil material of palms resembling members of the extant tribe Cocoseae is described from the Cretaceous-Paleogene transition of the Deccan Intertrappean Beds (Madhya Pradesh, India) by Kumar, Manchester & Khan (2024), who interpret cocosoid palms as dominant among the arecoid palms of the Deccan Intertrappean beds in Madhya Pradesh.
- A study on the affinities of elongated fossil fruits of members of the genus Carex, providing evidence of the continued presence of Carex sect. Cyperoideae in the Old World since the Miocene, is published by Martinetto et al. (2024).

=== Basal eudicots ===
Name	Novelty	Status	Authors	Age	Unit	Location	Synonymized taxa	Notes	Images
Berberis mahonioides	Sp. nov	Valid	Kovar-Eder	Miocene		Austria		A species of Berberis.	
Clematis oligoneure	Comb. nov	Valid	(Ettingshausen)	Miocene		Austria		A species of Clematis; moved from "Elaeodendron" oligoneure Ettingshausen (1869).	
Costellifructus	Gen. et sp. nov	Valid	Axsmith et al.	Late Cretaceous (Santonian)	Eutaw Formation	United States (Alabama)		A member of the family Ranunculaceae. The type species is C. alabamensis.	
Palaeosinomenium indicum	Sp. nov		Kumar, Manchester & Khan	Cretaceous-Paleocene (Maastrichtian-Danian)	Deccan Intertrappean Beds	India		A member of the family Menispermaceae. Announced in late 2024, published fully in 2025.	
Palaeosinomenium oisensis	Sp. nov	Valid	Kara et al.	Paleocene		France		A member of the family Menispermaceae. Published online in 2023; the final version of the article naming it was published in 2024.	
Platanites fremontensis	Comb. nov		(Berry) Nares, Huegele, Manchester	Eocene	Aycross Formation "Tipperary flora"	United States (Wyoming)	Negundo fremontensis (1930)	A sycamore relative Moved from Aleurites fremontensis (1974).	
Platanites montanus	Comb. nov		(Brown) Nares, Huegele, Manchester	Late Cretaceous; Maastrichtian	Hell Creek Formation	United States (Montana; North Dakota)		A sycamore relative moved from Sassafras montana Brown (1939).	
Sabia megacarpa	Sp. nov	Valid	Latchaw & Manchester	Miocene	Succor Creek Formation	United States (Idaho; Oregon)		A member of Proteales belonging to the family Sabiaceae.	

- Patel et al. (2024) describe fossil reproductive organ of a member of the genus Nelumbo from the Palana Formation (India), and interpret this finding as indicative of the existence of a freshwater ecosystem in the Rajasthan Basin during the early Eocene.
- Danika et al. (2024) describe leaf fossils of Platanus academiae from the Miocene to Pleistocene strata in Greece, trace the presence of morphological traits characteristic of the Pacific North American–European clade of members of the genus Platanus (including Platanus orientalis, Platanus racemosa and Platanus wrightii) in the fossil record of North American and Eurasian Platanus, and argue that modern distribution of members of the Pacific North American–European clade is more likely the result of migration from through Beringia into Asia than the result of a migration through North Atlantic.

=== Superasterids ===
==== Aquifoliales ====
Name	Novelty	Status	Authors	Age	Unit	Location	Synonymized taxa	Notes	Images
Ilex wennebergii	Sp. nov		Rasmussen & Johansen in Rasmussen et al.	Eocene	Baltic amber	Denmark		A holly.	

==== Boraginales ====
Name	Novelty	Status	Authors	Age	Unit	Location	Synonymized taxa	Notes	Images
Cordioxylon indicum	Sp. nov	Valid	Bhatia, Srivastava & Mehrotra	Miocene	Tipam Sandstone	India		Fossil wood of a member of the genus Cordia. Announced in 2023; the final version of the article naming it was published in 2024.	

==== Caryophyllales ====
Name	Novelty	Status	Authors	Age	Unit	Location	Synonymized taxa	Notes	Images
Ancistrocladus eocenicus	Sp. nov		Ali, Manchester & Khan in Ali et al.	Eocene	Palana Formation	India		A species of Ancistrocladus.	

==== Cornales ====
Name	Novelty	Status	Authors	Age	Unit	Location	Synonymized taxa	Notes	Images
Fenestracarpa	Gen. et sp. nov		Nguyen & Atkinson	Late Cretaceous (Campanian)	Cedar District Formation	United States (Washington)		A member of Cornales not assignable to any extant family. Genus includes new species F. washingtonensis.	

==== Dipsacales ====
Name	Novelty	Status	Authors	Age	Unit	Location	Synonymized taxa	Notes	Images
Sambucus ettingshausenii	Sp. nov	Valid	Kovar-Eder	Miocene		Austria		A species of Sambucus.	

==== Ericales ====
Name	Novelty	Status	Authors	Age	Unit	Location	Synonymized taxa	Notes	Images
Pterosinojackia	Gen. et sp. nov	Valid	Kowalski in Kowalski et al.	Oligocene to Miocene		Germany		A member of the family Styracaceae. The type species is P. lusatica.	
Remberella	Gen. et comb. nov	Valid	Manchester & Judd	Miocene	Latah Formation	United States (Washington)		A probable Ebenaceae genus The type species is Porana microcalyx (1929); First named as Diospyros? microcalyx (1926)	Remberella microcalyx
Sapotoxylon costarricensis	Sp. nov		Cevallos-Ferriz et al.	Miocene		Costa Rica		Wood of a member of the family Sapotaceae.	
Symplocos ampullaris	Sp. nov		Xu & Jin in Xu et al.	Oligocene and Miocene		China		A species of Symplocos.	
Symplocos unilocularis	Sp. nov		Xu & Jin in Xu et al.	Oligocene	Yongning Formation	China		A species of Symplocos.	
Ternstroemites diversifolius	Comb. nov	Valid	(Ettingshausen)	Miocene		Austria		A member of the family Theaceae; moved from "Euonymus" diversifolius Ettingshausen (1888).	
Ternstroemites egeriae	Comb. nov	Valid	(Ettingshausen)	Miocene		Austria		A member of the family Theaceae; moved from "Sorbus" egeriae Ettingshausen (1888).	
Ternstroemites stiriacus	Comb. nov	Valid	(Ettingshausen)	Miocene		Austria		A member of the family Theaceae; moved from "Elaeodendron" stiriacum Ettingshausen (1869).	

==== Gentianales ====
Name	Novelty	Status	Authors	Age	Unit	Location	Synonymized taxa	Notes	Images
Apocynoxylon umut-tuncii	Sp. nov		Akkemik & Mantzouka in Akkemik, Toprak & Mantzouka	Eocene	Çekerek Formation	Turkey			
Aspidospermoxylon guatambue	Sp. nov	Valid	Ramos et al.	Pleistocene	El Palmar Formation	Argentina		Fossil wood of a member of the family Apocynaceae.	
Aspidospermoxylon paleoneuron	Sp. nov	Valid	Ramos et al.	Pleistocene	El Palmar Formation	Argentina		Fossil wood of a member of the family Apocynaceae.	

==== Santalales ====
Name	Novelty	Status	Authors	Age	Unit	Location	Synonymized taxa	Notes	Images
Schoepfioides	Gen. et sp. nov		Huang, Liu & Wang	Eocene (Priabonian)	Baltic amber	Russia (Kaliningrad Oblast)		A member of the family Schoepfiaceae. The type species is S. kaliningradensis.	

==== Superastrids Incertae sedis ====
Name	Novelty	Status	Authors	Age	Unit	Location	Synonymized taxa	Notes	Images
Othniophyton	Gen et comb nov	in press	Manchester, Judd, Correa-Narvaez	Eocene; Middle Eocene	Green River Formation; Parachute Creek Member	USA; Colorado	O. elongatum synonymy: Apocynophyllurn wilcoxense (of Berry, 1929); ?Celastrophyllum lesquereuxii (1929); Ternstroemites viridifluminis (1929)	A superastrid plant of possible caryophyllalean affinity. First described as Oreopanax elongatum (1969)	

==== Superasterid research ====
- Manchester, Kapgate & Judd (2024) interpret caryophyllalean fruits Kuprianovaites deccanensis from the Cretaceous Deccan Intertrappean Beds (India) as belonging to a member of the family Montiaceae.
- Del Rio, Atkinson & Smith (2024) report the discovery of cherries of Cornus multilocularis from the Paleocene strata from the Berru site (France), expanding stratigraphic range of the species by approximately 4–6 million years and providing the first unambiguous evidence of the presence of cornelian cherries in Europe during the Paleocene.

=== Superrosids ===
==== Celastrales ====
Name	Novelty	Status	Authors	Age	Unit	Location	Synonymized taxa	Notes	Images
Palaeochrysa	Gen. et sp. nov	Valid	Conran, Bannister & Lee	Miocene	Foulden Maar Lagerstätte	New Zealand		A member of the family Celastraceae. The type species is P. celastroides.	

==== Fabales ====
Name	Novelty	Status	Authors	Age	Unit	Location	Synonymized taxa	Notes	Images
Aphanocalyxylon	Gen. et sp. nov		Cevallos-Ferriz et al.	Miocene		Costa Rica		Wood of a member of Detarioideae. The type species is A. carballense.	
Bauhinia tengchongensis	Sp. nov		Cao, Wu & Ding in Cao et al.	Pliocene	Mangbang Formation	China			
Cynometroxylon aegyptiacum	Sp. nov		El-Noamani & Ziada	Miocene	Gebel El-Khashab Formation	Egypt		A member of Detarioideae.	
Dalbergia ziwenii	Sp. nov		Zhao, Huang & Su in Zhao et al.	Miocene	Lower Sanhaogou Formation	China		A species of Dalbergia.	
Dalbergioxylon judasea	Sp. nov		Cevallos-Ferriz et al.	Miocene		Costa Rica		Wood of a member of Papilionoideae.	
Hymenaeaphyllum	Gen. et sp. nov		Hernández-Damián, Rubalcava-Knoth & Cevallos-Ferriz	Miocene	La Quinta Formation (Mexican amber)	Mexico		A member of the subfamily Detarioideae belonging to the tribe Detarieae. The type species is H. mirandae.	
Jantungspermum	Gen. et sp. nov	Valid	Spagnuolo & Wilf in Spagnuolo et al.	Eocene	Tanjung Formation	Indonesia		A legume. Genus includes new species J. gunnellii.	
Mezoneuron zhekunii	Sp. nov		Zhao, Jia & Su in Zhao et al.	Miocene	Sanhaogou Formation	China		A species of Mezoneuron.	

==== Fagales ====
Name	Novelty	Status	Authors	Age	Unit	Location	Synonymized taxa	Notes	Images
Alnus milleri	Comb. nov	Valid	(Ettingshausen)	Miocene		Austria		An alder; moved from "Tilia" milleri Ettingshausen (1869).	
Engelhardioxylon lesbium	Sp. nov	Valid	Iamandei & Iamandei in Iamandei et al.	Miocene		Greece		Wood of a member of the family Juglandaceae.	
Eucaryoxylon lesbium	Sp. nov	Valid	Iamandei & Iamandei in Iamandei et al.	Miocene		Greece		Wood of a member of the family Juglandaceae.	
Juglans cordata	Sp. nov	Valid	Manchester et al.	Eocene	Buchanan Lake Formation	Canada (Nunavut)		A species of Juglans.	
Juglans eoarctica	Sp. nov	Valid	Manchester et al.	Eocene	Buchanan Lake Formation	Canada (Nunavut)		A species of Juglans.	
Juglans nathorstii	Sp. nov	Valid	Manchester et al.	Eocene	Buchanan Lake Formation	Canada (Nunavut)		A species of Juglans.	
Morella stoppii	Comb. nov	Valid	(Kirchheimer)	Miocene		Germany		A member of the family Myricaceae; moved from Myrica stoppii Kirchheimer (1942).	
Pogonokarydion	Gen. et comb. nov	Valid	Manchester & Judd	Eocene	Florissant Formation	United States (Colorado)		A new genus for "Juncus" crassulus Cockerell (1908).	
Pterocarya liae	Sp. nov	Valid	Song & Wang in Song et al.	Eocene	Niubao Formation	China		A species of Pterocarya.	

==== Malpighiales ====
Name	Novelty	Status	Authors	Age	Unit	Location	Synonymized taxa	Notes	Images
Aspidopterys mangbangensis	Sp. nov		Lou & Ding in Lou et al.	Pliocene		China		A species of Aspidopterys.	
Calophyllum ramthiensis	Sp. nov		Mahato et al.	Neogene		India		A species of Calophyllum.	
Dicella indica	Sp. nov	Valid	Hazra, Manchester & Khan	Pliocene		India		A species of Dicella.	
Passiflora axsmithii	Sp. nov		Stults, Hermsen & Starnes	Oligocene	Catahoula Formation	United States (Mississippi)		A species of Passiflora.	

==== Malvales ====
Name	Novelty	Status	Authors	Age	Unit	Location	Synonymized taxa	Notes	Images
Eriolaena paleowallichii	Sp. nov		Shukla, Chandra & Shukla	Late Paleocene to early Eocene	Palana Formation	India		A species of Eriolaena.	
Malvacioxylon	Gen. et sp. nov		Cevallos-Ferriz et al.	Miocene		Costa Rica		Wood of a member of the family Malvaceae. The type species is M. conacytea.	
Uiher	Gen. et sp. nov		Siegert, Gandolfo & Wilf	Eocene	Huitrera Formation	Argentina		A member of Malvoideae. Genus includes new species U. karuen.	

==== Myrtales ====
Name	Novelty	Status	Authors	Age	Unit	Location	Synonymized taxa	Notes	Images
Andesanthus risaraldense	Sp. nov		Ayala-Usma & Lozano-Gutiérrez in Ayala-Usma et al.	Pleistocene		Colombia		A species of Andesanthus.	
Eucalitoxylon	Gen. et sp. nov		Cevallos-Ferriz et al.	Oligocene-Miocene	Masachapa Formation	Nicaragua		Wood of a member of the family Myrtaceae. The type species is E. nicaraguense.	
Hindeucalyptus	Gen. et sp. nov		Patel, Almeida, Ali & Khan in Patel et al.	Eocene	Palana Formation	India		A member of the family Myrtaceae. The type species is H. eocenicus.	
Miconia villasenorii	Sp. nov		Centeno-González, Alvarado-Cárdenas & Estrada-Ruiz	Miocene	Mexican amber	Mexico		A species of Miconia.	
Myrceugenellites antarcticus	Comb. nov	Valid	(Poole, Hunt & Cantrill)	Paleocene (Danian)		Antarctica		Fossil wood of a member of the family Myrtaceae; moved from Myrceugenelloxylon antarcticus Poole, Hunt & Cantrill (2001).	
Qualeoxylon lafila	Sp. nov		Woodcock	Eocene		Peru		Fossil wood with affinities with the family Vochysiaceae.	
Terminalioxylon gumminae	Sp. nov		Ayala-Usma & Lozano-Gutiérrez in Ayala-Usma et al.	Pleistocene		Colombia		Fossil wood of a member of the family Combretaceae.	
Trapa radiatiformis	Sp. nov		Xiao in Xiao et al.	Miocene	Shengxian Formation	China		A water caltrop.	
Uruguaianoxylon ragoneseae	Sp. nov		Franco, Martinez Martinez & Brea	Miocene	Ituzaingó Formation	Brazil		A member of the family Myrtaceae.	

==== Oxalidales ====
Name	Novelty	Status	Authors	Age	Unit	Location	Synonymized taxa	Notes	Images
Sloanea serratifolia	Comb. nov	Valid	(Ettingshausen)	Miocene		Austria		A species of Sloanea; moved from "Artocarpidium" serratifolium Ettingshausen (1869).	

==== Rosales ====
Name	Novelty	Status	Authors	Age	Unit	Location	Synonymized taxa	Notes	Images
Ficoxylon anatolica	Sp. nov		Akkemik & Mantzouka in Akkemik, Toprak & Mantzouka	Eocene	Çekerek Formation	Turkey			
Rosa mariae	Sp. nov	Valid	Agbamuche, Hamersma & Manchester	Oligocene		United States (Oregon)		A rose.	
Rosa packardae	Sp. nov	Valid	Fields, Agbamuche & Hamersma in Agbamuche, Hamersma & Manchester	Miocene	Sucker Creek Formation	United States (Oregon)		A rose.	
Ziziphoxylon sayaz	Sp. nov	Valid	Akkemik in Akkemik & Toprak	Miocene (Burdigalian-Serravallian)	Mut Formation	Turkey		Fossil wood of a member of the family Rhamnaceae.	

==== Sapindales ====
Name	Novelty	Status	Authors	Age	Unit	Location	Synonymized taxa	Notes	Images
Anacardium quindiuense	Sp. nov		Ayala-Usma, Lozano-Gutiérrez & Orejuela in Ayala-Usma et al.	Pleistocene		Colombia		A species of Anacardium.	
Dobineaites	Gen. et comb. nov	Valid	Wilf et al.	Eocene	Laguna del Hunco Formation	Argentina		A member of Anacardiaceae related to Dobinea; a new genus for "Celtis" ameghinoi.	
Pericuxylon	Gen. et sp. nov	Valid	Mejia-Roldán, Rodríguez-Reyes & Estrada-Ruiz in Mejia-Roldán et al.	Eocene	Tepetate Formation	Mexico		Fossil wood of a member of the family Anacardiaceae. The type species is P. ductifera.	

==== Saxifragales ====
Name	Novelty	Status	Authors	Age	Unit	Location	Synonymized taxa	Notes	Images
Liquidambar nanningensis	Sp. nov		Xu, Zdravchev, Maslova & Jin in Xu et al.	Oligocene	Yongning Formation	China		A species of Liquidambar.	
Parrotia zhiyanii	Sp. nov	Valid	Wu et al.	Miocene	Zhangpu amber	China		A species of Parrotia. Published online in 2023; the final version of the article naming it was published in 2024.	
Zlatkophyllum	Gen. et comb. nov	Valid	Wu et al.	Eocene		Germany		A member of the family Altingiaceae. Genus includes "Laurophyllum" fischkandelii Kunzmann & Walther (2002).	

==== Vitales ====
Name	Novelty	Status	Authors	Age	Unit	Location	Synonymized taxa	Notes	Images
Ampelocissus wenae	Sp. nov	Valid	Herrera et al.	Miocene	Cucaracha Formation	Panama		A species of Ampelocissus.	
Cissus correae	Sp. nov	Valid	Herrera et al.	Miocene	Cucaracha Formation	Panama		A species of Cissus.	
Leea mcmillanae	Sp. nov	Valid	Herrera et al.	Eocene	Tonosí Formation	Panama		A species of Leea.	
Lithouva susmanii	Sp. nov	Valid	Herrera et al.	Paleocene	Bogotá Formation	Colombia		A member of the family Vitaceae.	
Nekemias mucronata	Sp. nov		Tosal, Vicente & Denk	Eocene to Oligocene	Montmaneu Formation	Spain		A species of Nekemias.	
Parthenocissus rhombifolia	Comb. nov	Valid	(Ettingshausen)	Miocene		Austria		A species of Parthenocissus; moved from "Acer" rhombifolium Ettingshausen (1869).	

==== Superrosid research ====
- Lagrange, Martínez & Del Rio (2024) study the seed morphology of members of the tribe Paropsieae in the family Passifloraceae, and argue that, with exception of distinctive seeds of members of the genus Androsiphonia, fossil Paropsieae cannot be identified confidently based solely on seed characters.
- Ali et al. (2024) report the discovery of fossil material of a member of the genus Florissantia from the Eocene strata from the Gurha lignite mine (Rajasthan, India), extending known geographical range of members of this genus.

=== Other angiosperms ===
Name	Novelty	Status	Authors	Age	Unit	Location	Synonymized taxa	Notes	Images
Aextoxicoxylon jacksius	Sp. nov		Tilley	Paleocene (Danian)	Sobral Formation	Antarctica		Fossil wood of a flowering plant sharing traits with extant Aextoxicon punctatum.	
Archaebuda cretaceae	Sp. nov		Huang & Wang	Early Cretaceous (Barremian–Aptian)	Yixian Formation	China		An early flowering plant.	
Comoxia	Gen. et sp. nov		Jud et al.	Late Cretaceous	Northumberland Formation	Canada (British Columbia)		A dicot liana of uncertain affinities. Genus includes new species C. multiporosa.	
Felinanthus	Gen. et comb. nov		Heřmanová et al.	Late Cretaceous		Czech Republic; Germany		A flowering plant with pollen of the Normapolles type. Genus includes "Walbeckia" aquisgranensis Knobloch & Mai (1986), "Microcarpolithes" guttaeformis Knobloch (1971), "Walbeckia" scutata Knobloch & Mai (1986) and "Walbeckia" fricii Knobloch & Mai (1986).	
Nothophylica	Gen. et comb. nov		Beurel et al.	Cretaceous	Burmese amber	Myanmar		A flowering plant of uncertain affinities. Oskolski et al. (2024) interpreted it as a flowering plant with an affinity to Rhamnaceae, possibly to an extinct basal lineage; on the other hand Beurel et al. (2024) interpreted it as a flowering plant with probable magnoliid affinities. The type species is "Phylica" piloburmensis Shi et al. (2022).	

=== General Angiosperm research ===
- The reinterpretation of Endobeuthos paleosum as a member of the family Proteaceae proposed by Chambers & Poinar (2023) is rejected by Lamont & Ladd (2024).
- Hošek et al. (2024) report fossil evidence from the northernmost part of the Vienna Basin in southern Moravia (Czech Republic) indicative of survival of trees such as oak, linden and Fraxinus excelsior in the area during the Last Glacial Maximum, and interpret their survival as made possible by the existence of hot springs providing stable conditions for the long-term maintenance of refugia.

== Other plants ==
Name	Novelty	Status	Authors	Age	Unit	Location	Synonymized taxa	Notes	Images
Alasemenia	Gen. et sp. nov		Wang et al.	Devonian (Famennian)	Wutong Formation	China		A seed plant of uncertain affinities. The type species is A. tria.	
Anisopteris shuteana	Sp. nov	Valid	Hayes & Pearson	Carboniferous (Viséan)	Teilia Formation	United Kingdom		A member of Lyginopteridales.	
Callipteris seshufenensis	Sp. nov	Valid	Chen in Chen, Zhang & Yang	Permian		China		A callipterid seed fern.	
Callixylon seamrogia	Sp. nov		Durieux, Decombeix, Harper, Ramel & Prestianni in Durieux et al.	Devonian (Famennian)	Harrylock Formation	Ireland		A member of Archaeopteridales.	
Compsopteris longipinnata	Sp. nov	Valid	Naugolnykh	Permian		Russia (Perm Krai)		A member of Peltaspermales.	
Cordaites pastuchovicensis	Sp. nov	Valid	Šimůnek			Czech Republic			
Cordaites roprachticensis	Sp. nov	Valid	Šimůnek			Czech Republic			
Cordaites setlikii	Sp. nov	Valid	Šimůnek			Czech Republic			
Cosmosperma dicrana	Sp. nov		Liu et al.	Devonian	Wutong Formation	China		An early seed plant.	
Cosmosperma lepta	Sp. nov		Liu et al.	Devonian	Wutong Formation	China		An early seed plant.	
Cyrillopteris orbicularis	Comb. nov		(Halle)	Permian	Upper Shihezi Formation	China		A seed fern. Moved from Odontopteris orbicularis Halle (1927).	
Dicroidium sinensis	Sp. nov		Sun & Deng in Sun et al.	Middle Triassic	Tongchuan Formation	China		A seed fern belonging to the family Umkomasiaceae.	
Gnetopsis quadria	Sp. nov		Wang et al.	Devonian (Famennian)		China			
Harrisiothecium roesleri	Comb. nov		(Van Konijnenburg-van Cittert et al.)	Late Triassic		Germany		Pollen organ of a plant of uncertain affinities. Moved from Hydropterangium roesleri Van Konijnenburg-van Cittert et al. (2017)	
Harrisiothecium sanduense	Sp. nov		Shi et al.	Late Triassic	Yangmeilong Formation	China		Pollen organ of a plant of uncertain affinities, associated with pinnate leaves of Ptilozamites.	
Ilfeldia tectlapis	Sp. nov		Zhou et al.	Permian (Asselian)	Taiyuan Formation	China		A taeniopterid plant.	
Mixoxylon jeffersonii	Sp. nov		Oh et al.	Early Jurassic (Toarcian)	Mawson Formation	Antarctica		Indeterminate Spermatopyte Wood, maybe related with Bennettitales or Cycadales	
Neuralethopteris lindahlii	Comb. nov	Valid	(White)	Carboniferous		United States		A member of Medullosales. Moved from Neuropteris lindahlii White (1903).	
Panxianopteris	Gen. et sp. nov		Qin, He, Hilton & Wang in Qin et al.	Permian	Xuanwei Formation	China		A taeniopterid. The type species is P. taeniopteroides.	
Protocircoporoxylon guyangensis	Sp. nov		Xu & Zhao in Zhao et al.	Early Cretaceous	Guyang Formation	China		A gymnosperm wood.	
Protocupressinoxylon baii	Sp. nov		Jiang & Wan in Jiang et al.	Permian	Upper Shihhotse Formation	China		Fossil trunk of a gymnosperm.	
Pseudotorellia oskolica	Sp. nov		Nosova in Nosova, Fedyaevskiy & Lyubarova	Middle Jurassic (Bathonian–Callovian)		Russia (Belgorod Oblast)		A gymnosperm belonging to the family Pseudotorelliaceae.	
Sanfordiacaulis	Gen. et sp. nov		Gastaldo et al.	Carboniferous (Tournaisian)	Albert Formation	Canada (New Brunswick)		A tree of uncertain affinities. The type species is S. densifolia.	
Satpuraphyllum	Gen. et sp. nov		Agnihotri, Srivastava & McLoughlin	Permian (Kungurian)	Barakar Formation	India		A member of Peltaspermales. The type species is S. furcatum.	
Shaolinia	Gen. et sp. nov		Wang & Chen	Early Cretaceous	Yixian Formation	China		A plant with conifer-like vegetative and reproductive morphologies, as well as a single seed partially wrapped by the subtending bract. The type species is S. intermedia.	
Triloboxylon maroccanum	Sp. nov		Meyer-Berthaud et al.	Devonian (Givetian)		Morocco		An aneurophytalean progymnosperm.	
Xenofructus	Gen. nov		Fu et al.	Middle Jurassic	Dabu Formation	China		A possible flowering plant. The type species is X. dabuensis, formerly named Williamsoniella dabuensis Zheng & Zhang (1990).	

=== Other plant research ===
- Drovandi et al. (2024) report the first discovery of an assemblage of basal tracheophytes from the Silurian (Přídolí) Rinconada Formation (Argentina), and interpret this finding as evidence of southward expansion of Silurian floras related to climate change from the cold conditions of the Ludfordian to the subsequent greenhouse conditions.
- Purported bryophyte Tortilicaulis is reinterpreted as an early diverging tracheophyte by Morris et al. (2024).
- Garza et al. (2024) determine Homerian–Gorstian maximum ages for fossils of Cooksonia from Borrisnoe Mountain (Ireland) and Capel Horeb (Wales, United Kingdom).
- Gess & Berry (2024) describe fossil material of members of the genus Archaeopteris that were more than 20 m in height from the Waterloo Farm lagerstätte (South Africa), providing evidence of presence of true forests of Archaeopteris in high latitudes during the latest Devonian.
- Redescription and a study on the affinities of Stauroxylon beckii is published by Durieux et al. (2024).
- A study on the morphological diversity of cycad leaves throughout their evolutionary history, providing evidence of a dynamic history of diversification, is published by Coiro & Seyfullah (2024).
- Zhang et al. (2024) compile a dataset of macroscopic and cuticular traits of fossils of members of the group Czekanowskiales from China, and use it to classify the studied fossils on the basis of quantitative analytical evidence.
- Purported Triassic fossils of members of Glossopteridales from India are reinterpreted as Permian in age by Saxena, Cleal & Singh (2024).
- Taxonomic revision of members of the genus Sagenopteris is published by Xu et al. (2024).
- Crane et al. (2024) interpret Dordrechtites elongatus as a highly modified lateral branch of a seed cone, and report the presence of structural similarities between Dordrechtites and the cupules of members of Doyleales.
- A study on the morphology and affinities of Furcula granulifer is published by Coiro et al. (2024), who interpret the studied plant as a likely relative of pteridosperms such as Scytophyllum and Vittaephyllum, and interpret F. granulifer as a plant that evolved its hierarchical vein system of leaves convergently with the flowering plants.
- Possible caytonialean pteridosperm fossils are described from the Bajocian strata in the Karachay-Cherkessia (Russia) by Naugolnykh & Mitta (2024).
- Sender et al. (2024) describe five types of gymnosperm leaves assigned to the genus Desmiophyllum from Cretaceous (ranging from Barremian to the Albian-Cenomanian transition) sites in Spain, including types resembling leaves of the genus Welwitschiophyllum assigned to the Gnetales, and a type with similarities to leaves of the conifer genus Dammarites.

== Palynology ==
Name	Novelty	Status	Authors	Age	Unit	Location	Synonymized taxa	Notes	Images
Aratrisporites woodii	Sp. nov		Cooling in McKellar & Cooling	Jurassic–Cretaceous transition	Orallo Formation	Australia		Spores of a member of Isoetopsida.	
Arecipites moicanus	Sp. nov	Valid	D'Apolito, Silva-Caminha & Jaramillo	Miocene	Solimões Formation	Brazil		Fossil pollen.	
Callialasporites propinquivellersis	Sp. nov		McKellar & Cooling	Jurassic–Cretaceous transition	Evergreen Formation	Australia			
Camarozonosporites dorsus	Sp. nov		Cooling & McKellar	Jurassic–Cretaceous transition	Orallo Formation	Australia			
Clavatosporis varians	Sp. nov		De Benedetti et al.	Cretaceous-Paleogene transition	La Colonia Formation	Argentina		A fern spore of uncertain affinities.	
Contignisporites confractus	Sp. nov		Cooling in McKellar & Cooling	Jurassic–Cretaceous transition	Orallo Formation	Australia			
Converrucosisporites parvitumulus	Sp. nov		McKellar & Cooling	Jurassic–Cretaceous transition	Orallo Formation	Australia			
Converrucosisporites pricei	Sp. nov		McKellar & Cooling	Jurassic–Cretaceous transition	Gubberamunda Sandstone	Australia			
Convolutispora prisca	Sp. nov		McKellar & Cooling	Jurassic–Cretaceous transition	Walloon Coal Measures	Australia		Spores of a fern.	
Curvaturaspora	Gen. et comb. nov		McKellar & Cooling	Jurassic		Australia; Germany		Spores with uncertain (possibly lycopodialean) affinity. The type species is "Lycopodiacidites" frankonense Achilles (1981).	
Dejerseysporites	Gen. et sp. et comb. nov		McKellar & Cooling	Jurassic and Early Cretaceous	Hutton Sandstone	Australia; Canada; Germany		Spores of a member of the family Sphagnaceae. The type species is D. biannuliverrucatus; genus also includes "Stereisporites (Dicyclosporis)" verrucyclus Schulz in Döring et al (1966) and "Distalanulisporites" verrucosus Pocock (1970).	
Densoisporites filatoffii	Sp. nov		McKellar & Cooling	Jurassic–Cretaceous transition	Walloon Coal Measures	Australia			
Dicolpopollis pottiorum	Sp. nov	Valid	D'Apolito, Silva-Caminha & Jaramillo	Miocene	Solimões Formation	Brazil		Fossil pollen, probably of a member of the family Pontederiaceae.	
Dictyotosporites esterleae	Sp. nov		Cooling in Cooling & McKellar	Jurassic–Cretaceous transition	Orallo Formation	Australia			
Dictyotosporites obscurus	Sp. nov		McKellar & Cooling	Jurassic–Cretaceous transition	Mooga Sandstone	Australia			
Dictyotosporites sandrana	Sp. nov		McKellar in Cooling & McKellar	Jurassic–Cretaceous transition	Walloon Coal Measures	Australia			
Echinatisporis adultus	Sp. nov	Valid	D'Apolito, Silva-Caminha & Jaramillo	Miocene	Solimões Formation	Brazil		Fossil spores.	
Echitricolpites longicolpatus	Sp. nov		Thakre et al.	Late Cretaceous (Maastrichtian)	Mandla Formation	India		Pollen grains of uncertain affinity.	
Foveobrevitricolporites	Gen. et sp. nov		Thakre et al.	Late Cretaceous (Maastrichtian)	Mandla Formation	India		Pollen grains of uncertain affinity. The type species is F. foveolatus.	
Heteroclavatus	Gen. et sp. nov		Thakre et al.	Late Cretaceous (Maastrichtian)	Mandla Formation	India		Pollen grains of uncertain affinity. The type species is H. chitaleyae.	
Impardecispora neopunctata	Sp. nov		McKellar & Cooling	Jurassic–Cretaceous transition	Westbourne Formation	Australia			
Intertrappeapollis	Gen. et sp. nov		Thakre et al.	Paleocene (Danian)	Amarwara Formation	India		Pollen grains of uncertain affinity. The type species is I. perforatus.	
Interulobites scabratus	Sp. nov		McKellar & Cooling	Jurassic–Cretaceous transition	Hutton Sandstone	Australia		Probably spores of a bryophyte.	
Januasporites spinosireticulatus	Sp. nov		McKellar & Cooling	Jurassic–Cretaceous transition	Westbourne Formation	Australia			
Jiangsupollis intertrappea	Sp. nov		Thakre et al.	Late Cretaceous (Maastrichtian)	Mandla Formation	India		Pollen grains of uncertain affinity.	
Ladakhipollenites? pseudonanus	Sp. nov	Valid	D'Apolito, Silva-Caminha & Jaramillo	Miocene	Solimões Formation	Brazil		Fossil pollen.	
Liliacidites abruptus	Sp. nov	Valid	D'Apolito, Silva-Caminha & Jaramillo	Miocene	Solimões Formation	Brazil		Fossil pollen, probably of a member of the family Bromeliaceae.	
Loranthacites magnopolaris	Sp. nov	Valid	D'Apolito, Silva-Caminha & Jaramillo	Miocene	Solimões Formation	Brazil		Fossil pollen of a member of the family Loranthaceae.	
Maculatasporites eurombahensis	Sp. nov		McKellar & Cooling	Jurassic–Cretaceous transition	Hutton Sandstone	Australia		Possible algal spores.	
Maculatasporites fionabethiana	Sp. nov		McKellar in Cooling & McKellar	Jurassic–Cretaceous transition	Westbourne Formation	Australia		Possible algal spores.	
Malvacipolloides? dupliechinatus	Sp. nov	Valid	D'Apolito, Silva-Caminha & Jaramillo	Miocene	Solimões Formation	Brazil		Fossil pollen.	
Microreticulatisporites patagonicus	Sp. nov		De Benedetti et al.	Cretaceous-Paleogene transition	La Colonia Formation	Argentina		A fern spore of uncertain affinities.	
Neoraistrickia loconiensis	Sp. nov		De Benedetti et al.	Cretaceous-Paleogene transition	La Colonia Formation	Argentina		A lycophyte spore.	
Neoraistrickia parvibacula	Sp. nov		McKellar & Cooling	Jurassic–Cretaceous transition	Walloon Coal Measures	Australia			
Neoraistrickia rugobacula	Sp. nov		McKellar & Cooling	Jurassic–Cretaceous transition	Walloon Coal Measures	Australia			
Nevesisporites annakhlonovae	Nom. nov		McKellar & Cooling	Triassic		Pakistan		Probably spores of a hornwort; a replacement name for Simeonospora khlonovae Balme (1970).	
Osmundacidites injunensis	Sp. nov		McKellar & Cooling	Jurassic–Cretaceous transition	Hutton Sandstone	Australia			
Perisyncolporites verrucosus	Sp. nov	Valid	D'Apolito, Silva-Caminha & Jaramillo	Miocene	Solimões Formation	Brazil		Fossil pollen, probably of a member of the family Malpighiaceae.	
Peroaletes ieiunus	Sp. nov		McKellar & Cooling	Jurassic–Cretaceous transition	Westbourne Formation	Australia			
Perotrilites cameronii	Sp. nov		McKellar in Cooling & McKellar	Jurassic–Cretaceous transition	Hutton Sandstone	Australia			
Retitriletes johniorum	Sp. nov		Cooling in Cooling & McKellar	Jurassic–Cretaceous transition	Orallo Formation	Australia			
Retitriletes neofacetus	Sp. nov		McKellar & Cooling	Jurassic–Cretaceous transition	Hutton Sandstone	Australia			
Retitriletes proxiradiatus	Sp. nov		McKellar & Cooling	Jurassic–Cretaceous transition	Hutton Sandstone	Australia			
Retitriletes siobhaniae	Sp. nov		McKellar in Cooling & McKellar	Jurassic–Cretaceous transition	Gubberamunda Sandstone	Australia			
Retitriletes thomsonii	Sp. nov		Cooling in Cooling & McKellar	Jurassic–Cretaceous transition	Westbourne Formation	Australia			
Rhoipites gracilis	Sp. nov	Valid	D'Apolito, Silva-Caminha & Jaramillo	Miocene	Solimões Formation	Brazil		Fossil pollen.	
Rhombipollis rugulatus	Sp. nov		Thakre et al.	Late Cretaceous (Maastrichtian)	Mandla Formation	India		Pollen grains of uncertain affinity.	
Sellaspora passa	Sp. nov		McKellar & Cooling	Jurassic–Cretaceous transition	Westbourne Formation	Australia		Spores of a fern.	
Sparganiaceaepollenites annulatus	Sp. nov	Junior homonym	Thakre et al.	Paleocene (Danian)	Amarwara Formation	India		Possible pollen grains of a member of the family Typhaceae/Sparganiaceae. The name is preoccupied by Sparganiaceaepollenites annulatus De Benedetti (2023); furthermore, DeBenedetti et al. (2025) considered the species to be synonymous with the Maastrichtian species Sparganiaceaepollenites intertrappeansis.	
Spinizonocolpites deccanensis	Sp. nov		Thakre et al.	Late Cretaceous (Maastrichtian) and Paleocene (Danian)		India		Pollen grains of uncertain affinity.	
Spinizonocolpites gemmatus	Sp. nov		Thakre et al.	Late Cretaceous (Maastrichtian)	Mandla Formation	India		Pollen grains of uncertain affinity.	
Striamonocolpites paludosus	Sp. nov	Valid	D'Apolito, Silva-Caminha & Jaramillo	Miocene	Solimões Formation	Brazil		Fossil pollen, probably of a member of the family Cabombaceae.	
Syncolpraedapollis	Gen. et sp. nov		Mendes et al.	Eocene-Oligocene	Kwanza Basin	Angola		Genus includes new species S. angolensis.	
Thecaspora polygonalis	Sp. nov		De Benedetti et al.	Cretaceous-Paleogene transition	La Colonia Formation	Argentina		A salvinialean spore.	
Triporotetradites deccanensis	Sp. nov		Thakre et al.	Late Cretaceous (Maastrichtian)	Mandla Formation	India		Pollen grains of a possible member of the family Ericaceae.	
Tuberculatosporites westbournensis	Sp. nov		McKellar & Cooling	Jurassic–Cretaceous transition	Westbourne Formation	Australia		Spores of a member of the family Marattiaceae.	

=== Palynological research ===
- Strother & Taylor (2024) review the early spore fossil record.
- Evidence of the presence of robust spore walls sharing similarities with those seen in embryophytes, but probably not produced in a sporangium, is reported in spores from the Cambrian strata in Tennessee by Taylor & Strother (2024).
- A study on spore assemblages from Devonian paleosols in Voronezh and adjacent regions (Russia), interpreted as indicative of late Eifelian?–early Givetian age, is published by Wang, Alekseeva & Xu (2024).
- Mamontov, McLean & Gavrilova (2024) study the ultrastructure of Maiaspora concava and M. panopta, providing evidence of similarities with extant Gleicheniales, and interpret the origin of the Gleicheniales stem as related to closure of the Rheic Ocean in the Paleozoic.
- El Atfy et al. (2024) review the fossil record of the spore genus Vestispora from the Carboniferous of Gondwana, and describe new fossil material of members of five species belonging to this genus from the Moscovian-Gzhelian Dhiffah Formation (Egypt).
- A study on the palynoflora from the Permian Emakwezini Formation (South Africa) is published by Balarino et al. (2024), who interpret the studied fossils as providing evidence of the presence of complex forests during the Guadalupian, with plant diversity greater than indicated by the macrofloral record.
- Nhamutole et al. (2024) describe late Permian and Early Triassic palynological assemblages from the Maniamba Basin (Mozambique).
- A study on the earliest Triassic palynoflora from the Bulgo Sandstone (Australia), providing evidence of the presence of dense vegetation in riparian habitat less than 1 million years after the Permian–Triassic extinction event, is published by Vajda & Kear (2024).
- A study on the fossil record of Early Triassic palynomorphs from the Vikinghøgda Formation (Svalbard, Norway), providing evidence of a shift from lycophyte-dominated to a gymnosperm-dominated vegetation related to the onset of a cooling episode, is published by Leu et al. (2024).
- A study on the age of the Santa Clara Abajo and the Santa Clara Arriba formations and their palynomorph assemblages, previously inferred to be Carnian-Norian in age, is published by Benavente et al. (2024), who determine an upper Anisian age for both formations, and interpret their findings as indicating that the taxonomic composition of Triassic Gondwanan palynomorph assemblages correlates more strongly with latitude than with geologic age.
- Description of the late Carnian to early Norian palynological assemblages from the Mungaroo Formation (Australia) is published by Scibiorski (2024).
- The interpretation of Cycadopites and Ricciisporites proposed by Vajda et al. (2023), who considered them to represent, respectively, normal and aberrant pollen produced by the same plant with Lepidopteris ottonis foliage and Antevsia zeilleri pollen sacs, is contested by Zavialova (2024); Vajda et al. (2024) subsequently reaffirm that Antevsia zeilleri produced Cycadopites and Ricciisporites pollen.
- Evidence from pollen and spores from the Jiyuan Basin (China), interpreted as indicative of a relationship between two peaks of wildfires of different types and changes in plant communities during the Triassic-Jurassic transition, is presented by Zhang et al. (2024).
- Evidence of high abundances of malformed fern spores from the Lower Saxony Basin (Germany) during the Triassic–Jurassic transition, interpreted as indicative of persistence of volcanic-induced mercury pollution after the Triassic–Jurassic extinction event, is presented by Bos et al. (2024).
- Rodrigues et al. (2024) study the palynological assemblages from the Kwanza Basin (Angola) ranging from the late Albian to the Turonian, reporting the presence of pollen indicative of subtropical to tropical climate and dinocysts with higher latitude affinities, and interpret these findings as indicative of existence of an open connection between the Central Atlantic and South Atlantic oceans in the mid-Cretaceous.
- El Atfy et al. (2024) study the palynoflora dominated by Afropollis jardinus from the Cenomanian Bahariya Formation (Egypt), and interpret plants producing A. jardinus as likely parts of tropical, aquatic or mangrove-like vegetation.
- Description of the palynological assemblages from the Arlington Archosaur Site (Woodbine Group; Texas, United States), interpreted as indicative of tropical to subtropical climatic conditions during the Cenomanian, is published by Lorente, Noto & Flaig (2024).
- Evidence from the study of spores and pollen from the maritime Oyster Bay Formation (Vancouver Island, British Columbia, Canada), interpreted as indicative of the presence of refugia permitting greater stability of terrestrial plant communities during the Cretaceous-Paleogene transition than in continental regions, is presented by Patel et al. (2024) .
- Evidence from fossil pollen assigned to the form genus Classopollis, interpreted as indicative of existence of a refugium of members of the family Cheirolepidiaceae, is reported from the Paleocene Lower Wilcox Group (Texas, United States) by Smith et al. (2024).
- Grímsson et al. (2024) report the discovery of fossil pollen of members of the genus Hyaenanche from the Eocene Kipini Formation (Kenya), representing the earliest record of the genus from Africa.
- A study on changes of morphology of grass pollen from South America since the Early Miocene and on its probable drivers is published by Wei et al. (2024).
- Evidence from fossil pollen interpreted as indicative of existence of ecological corridors linking Andean, Atlantic and Amazonian regions of South America during the Last Glacial Maximum, resulting in establishment of complex connectivity patterns between plants from the studied parts of South America, is presented by Pinaya et al. (2024).
- Evidence from the study of pollen and microcharcoal data, indicative of decline in cold- and moist-affinity vegetation and spread of seasonal tropical vegetation in northern Amazonia during the slowdown of the Atlantic meridional overturning circulation 18,000 to 14,800 years ago, is presented by Akabane et al. (2024).

== General Research ==
- A study addressing and evaluating the uncertainty of plant fossil phylogenetics is published by Coiro (2024).
- Review of functional traits in the plant fossil record is published by McElwain et al. (2024).
- Evidence from the study of extant and fossil plants, interpreted as indicating that leaf mass per area distributions in fossil plants cannot accurately reconstruct the biome or climate of an individual site, is presented by Butrim, Lowe & Currano (2024).
- Evidence of the existence of two plant dispersal routes in the Devonian, connecting the South China and Euramerica–Siberia realms, is presented by Liu et al. (2024).
- Davies, McMahon & Berry (2024) describe plant fossils from the Devonian (Eifelian) Hangman Sandstone Formation (Somerset and Devon, United Kingdom), interpreted as remains of cladoxylopsid-dominated forest and possibly the oldest global evidence for the spacing of growing trees.
- Stacey et al. (2024) report possible evidence that Devonian and early Carboniferous oceanic oxygenation was related to the evolution of large vascular plants and the first forests.
- Evidence of changes of composition and diversity of the flora from the Carboniferous coal swamps of the Nord-Pas-de-Calais Coalfield (France) in response to climate and landscape changes is presented by Molina-Solís et al. (2024).
- Evidence of the presence of distinct patterns of damage inflicted by insects on seeds from the Permian (Asselian) Shanxi Formation (China), as well evidence of presence of anti-herbivory defences in the studied seeds in the form of hairs, spines, thick seed coats and apical horns, is presented by Santos, Wappler & (2024).
- Purens, DiMichele & Chaney (2024) identify plants fossils collected from a single geographic site (Farmer's/Cattle Tank locality) in south-central Baylor County (Texas, United States) as representing two distinct assemblages of Artinskian plants differing in their diversity structure, and interpret the studied assemblages as parts of the fossil record of early phases of a change during the Permian from floras dominated by drought-tolerant plants to floras that included more plants requiring high substrate moisture.
- McLoughlin et al. (2024) revise fossil material of Permian plants from the Falkland Islands collected by Thore Gustav Halle during the 1907–1909 Swedish Expedition to Patagonia and Tierra del Fuego.
- A study on changes of floral communities in southwestern China during the Permian-Triassic transition is published by Hua et al. (2024), who provide evidence indicative of frequent wildfires that destroyed the stability of wetlands prior to the main extinction phase and inhibited recovery in the aftermath of the Permian–Triassic extinction event, and resulted in gradual replacement of fern-dominated floral communities by gymnosperm-dominated ones.
- Turner, McLoughlin & Mays (2024) review the known record of plant–arthropod interactions on Early and Middle Triassic fossil leaves from Gondwana, reevaluate known record of the studied interactions in the Australian Middle Triassic Benolong Flora, and argue that concerted investigations can greatly increase the number of plant–arthropod interactions in the studied fossil assemblages.
- Description of the Middle Triassic plant assemblages from the Bamba, Pangarawe and Kakindu outcrops of the Tanga Basin (Tanzania) is published by Sabuni & Kustatscher (2024).
- Gurung et al. (2024) use a new vegetation and climate model to study links between plant geographical range, the long-term carbon cycle and climate, and find that reduced geographical range of plants in Pangaea resulted in increased atmospheric CO_{2} concentration during the Triassic and Jurassic periods, while the expande geographical range of plants after the breakup of Pangaea amplified global CO_{2} removal.
- Seyfullah et al. (2024) report the discovery of a conifer twig belonging to the genus Elatides from the Middle Jurassic Ishpushta Coal Formation (Afghanistan) preserved with resin traces that impregnated the surrounding coalified leaf material, representing the first case of such type of resin preservation impregnating plant tissues reported to date, and interpret this specimens as supporting cupressalean affinity for Elatides; the authors also describe a conifer fragment of Elatocladus sp. from Jurassic strata in Shaanxi (China) with similar resin traces.
- Kvaček et al. (2024) reconstruct Cenomanian plant communities from the Peruc–Korycany Formation (Czech Republic), providing evidence of diversification and dominance of flowering plant both in the Bohemian Cretaceous Basin and in Europe in general (particularly in alluvial plains).
- Quirk et al. (2024) study the distribution of extant and fossil ginger plants and dawn redwood, providing evidence of inconsistent climatic niches occupied by the former group through time and more consistent climatic niche of the latter one, and interpret dawn redwood as more appropriate for paleoclimatic reconstructions than ginger plants.
- Evidence of changes of composition of plant communities from northeastern Montana during the Cretaceous-Paleogene transition is presented by Wilson Deibel, Wilson Mantilla & Strömberg (2024).
- Rossetto-Harris & Wilf (2024) revise the diversity of the assemblage of Eocene leaves from the Río Pichileufú locality (Argentina) and report the presence of 82 valid leaf morphotypes.
- Kim et al. (2024) revise the Miocene flora from the Hamjin Formation (North Korea) and interpret it as indicative of warm and temperate climate.
- Atkins et al. (2024) describe macrofossil remains of plants from a new Quaternary assemblage from Robertson Cave in the Naracoorte region of South Australia.
- Evidence from lake sediments from Tengchong Qinghai Lake (Yunnan, China), interpreted as indicative of a shift from dense forest dominated by C_{3} plants to a more open forest environment with mixed C_{3} and C_{4} plants on the southeastern margin of the Tibetan Plateau that happened between 78,600 and 58,600 years before present and coincided with the occupation history of Homo sapiens in southern China, is presented by Chen et al. (2024).
- Evidence of the presence of fragmented tropical humid forests among connected savanna in Amazonia during the Last Glacial Maximum is presented by Kelley et al. (2024), who interpret their findings as indicating that distinct forest fragments were connected by areas with taller, dense woodland/tropical savanna that could sustain both Amazonian and Cerrado species.
- Mariani et al. (2024) study changes of shrub cover in southeastern Australia since the Last Interglacial, and report evidence of reduction in shrub cover during the Holocene, related to Indigenous Australian population expansion and cultural fire use.
- Review of the fossil record of photosynthetic microbes and plants from Ukraine, and of the impact of the Russian invasion of Ukraine on the study of this fossil record, is published by Shevchuk et al. (2024).

== Deaths ==
- Estella Leopold, paleobotanist and conservation paleontologist passes on February 25, 2024, at 97. Leopold's work as a conservationist included taking legal action to help save the Florissant Fossil Beds in Colorado, and fighting pollution. She was the daughter of Aldo Leopold.
