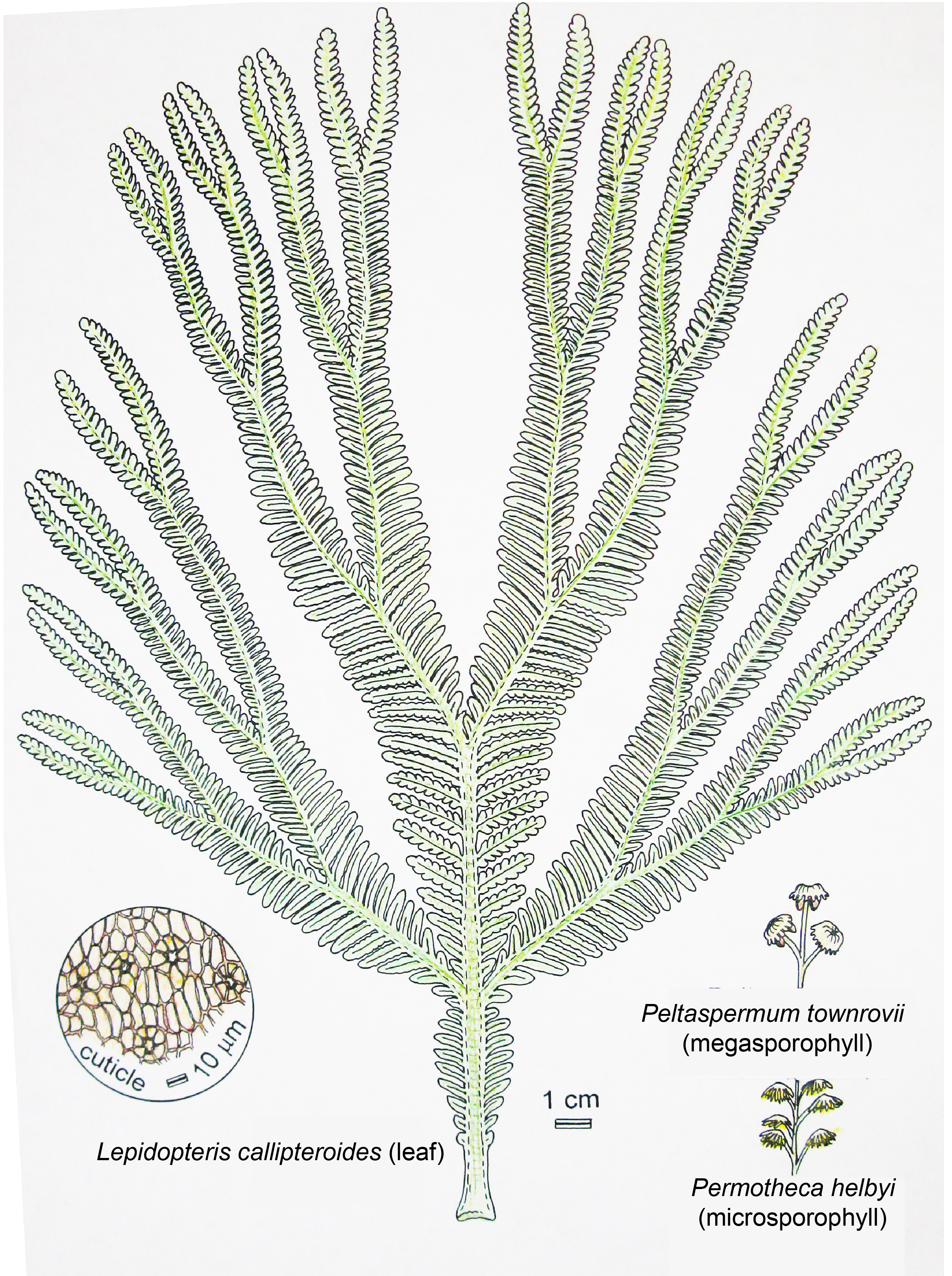
- Reconstruction of Lepidopteris callipteroides leaf, and its reproductive organs Peltaspermum townrovii and Permotheca helbyi from the latest Permian Coal Cliff Sandstone of Oakdale Colliery, NSW.

Scientific classification
- Kingdom: Plantae
- Clade: Tracheophytes
- Order: †Peltaspermales
- Family: †Peltaspermaceae
- Genus: †Lepidopteris
- Species: †L. callipteroides

Binomial name
- †Lepidopteris callipteroides (Carpentier) Retallack 2002

= Lepidopteris callipteroides =

Lepidopteris callipteroides Temporal range: Late Permian–Early Triassic

Species

Lepidopteris callipteroides is a form species for leaves of Late Permian Pteridospermatophyta, or seed ferns, which lived from around 252 million years ago in what is now Australia, and Madagascar. Lepidopteris callipteroides was an immediate survivor of the largest Permian-Triassic extinction event, migrating southward with the post-apocalyptic greenhouse spike.

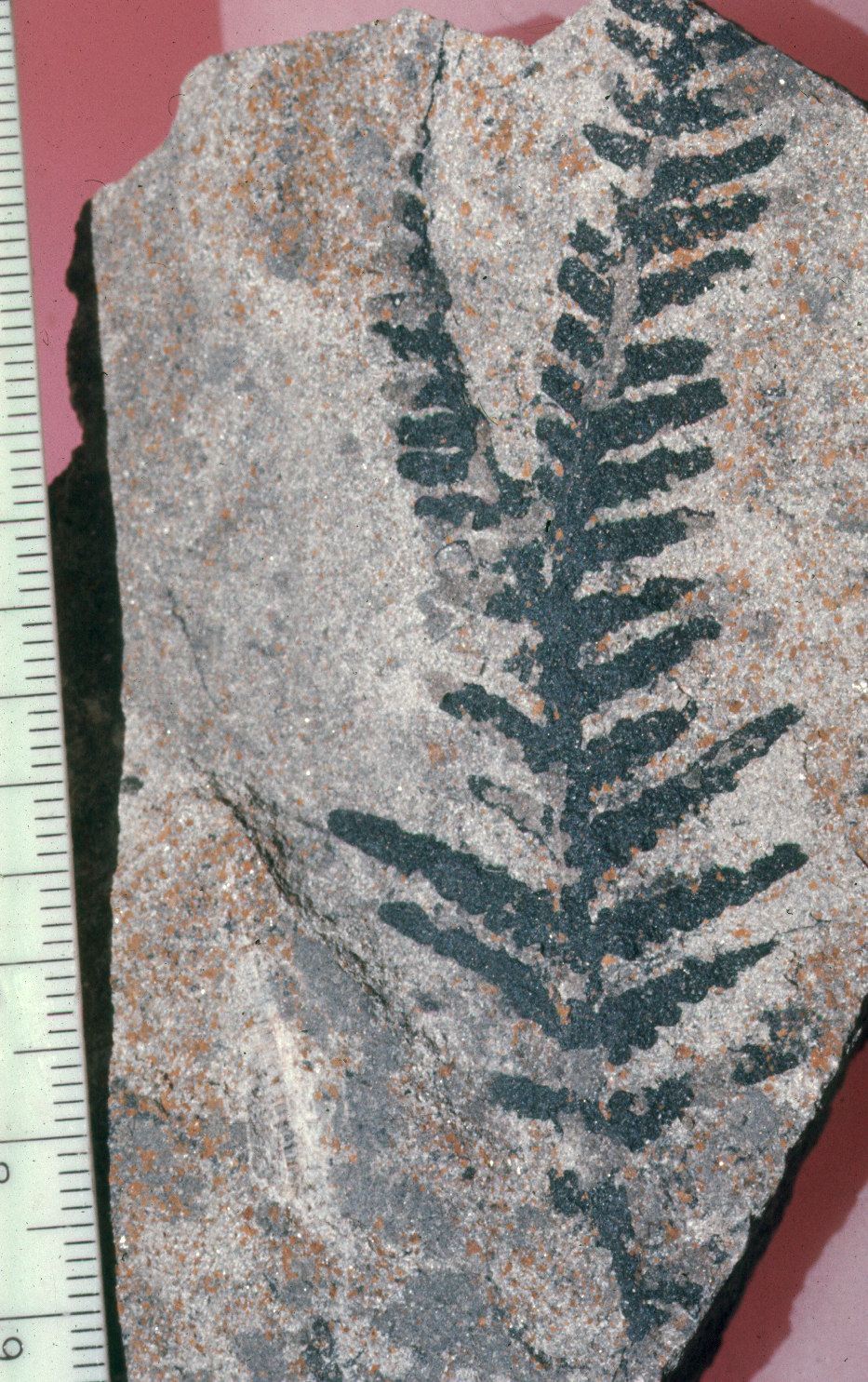
Lepidopteris callipteroides leaf from latest Permian Coal Cliff Sandstone of Oakdale Colliery, NSW

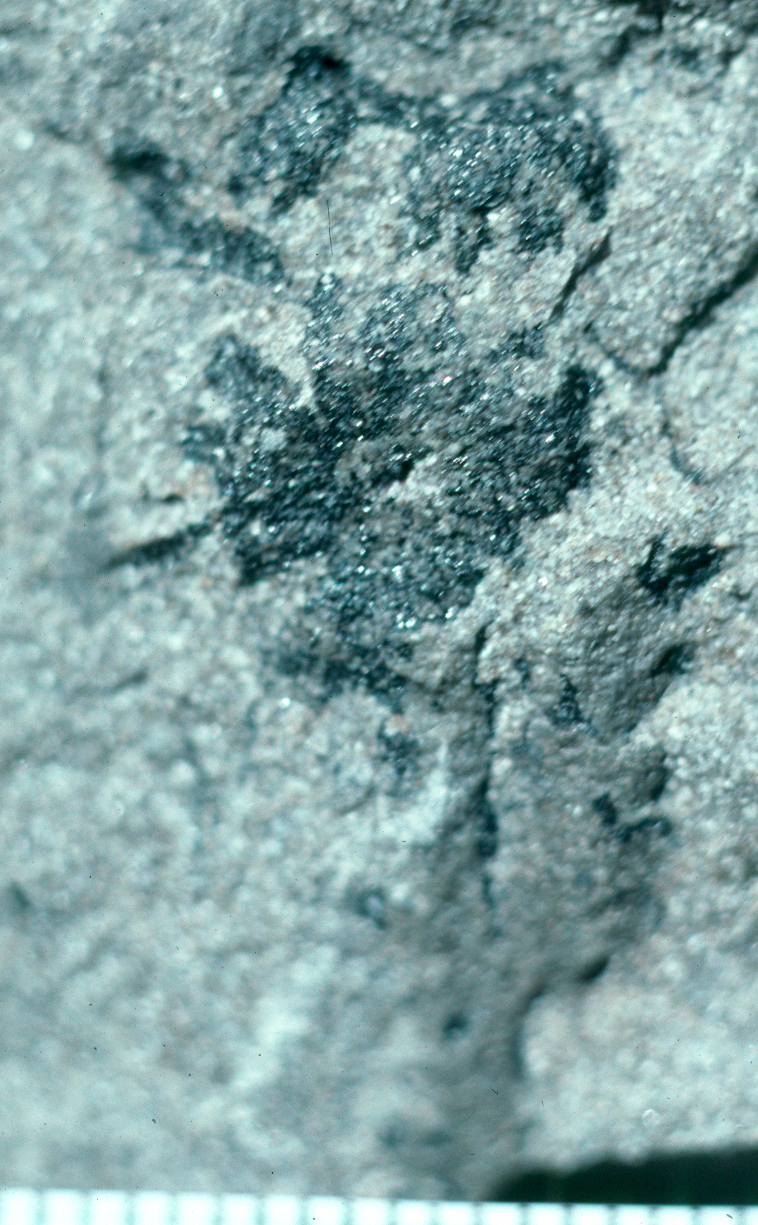
Ovulate structure Peltaspermum townrovii from latest Permian Coal Cliff Sandstone of Oakdale Colliery, NSW

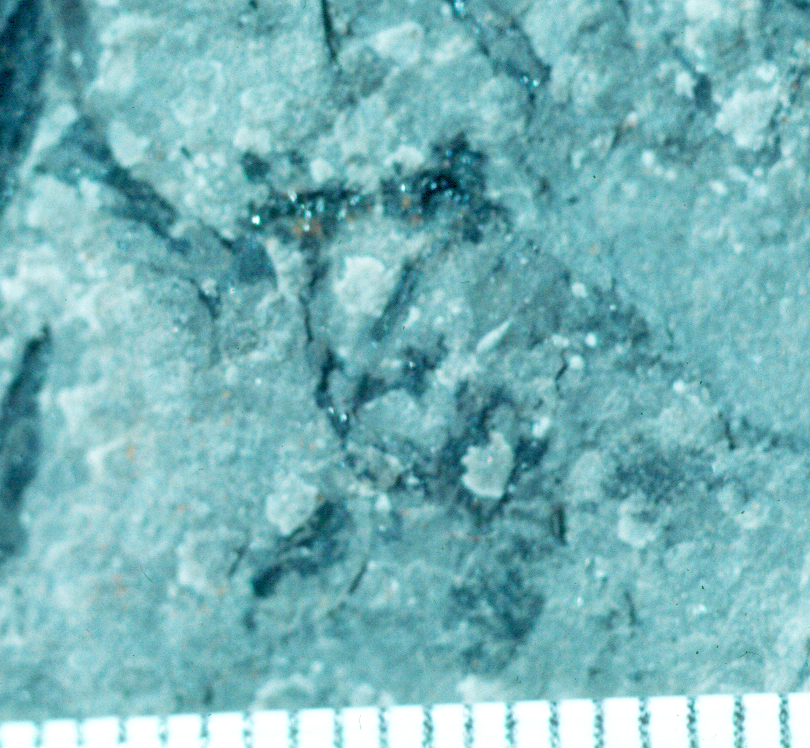
Pollen organ Permothteca helbyi from latest Permian Coal Cliff Sandstone of Oakdale Colliery, NSW

== Description ==
In the form generic system of paleobotany Lepidopteris is used only for leaves, which in Lepidopteris callipteroides is palmate with multiple dichotomies of the rachis. The cuticle of the leaves is thick and has distinctive cuticular structure with stomatal opening overhung by papillae, used to link the fossil leaves with well preserved ovulate structures of Peltaspermum townrovii and pollen organs of Permotheca helbyi in the same deposits

== Atmospheric carbon dioxide paleobarometer ==
The cuticular structure of Lepidopteris callipteroides is comparable to that of modern Ginkgo, and has been used to estimate past atmospheric carbon dioxide of an astounding 7832 ppm from its stomatal index immediately following the largest Permian-Triassic extinction event.
