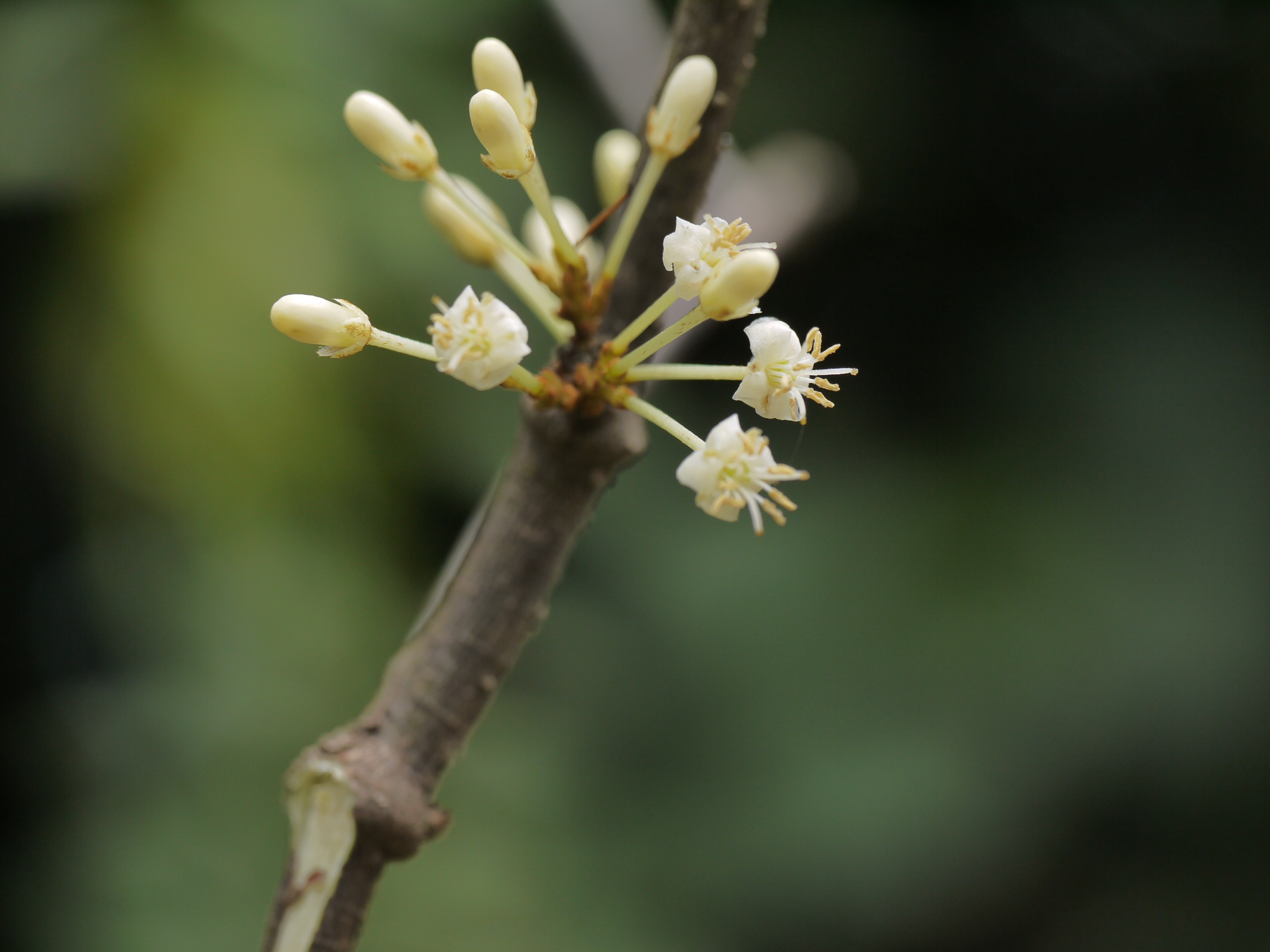
- Aspidopterys canarensis

Scientific classification
- Kingdom: Plantae
- Clade: Tracheophytes
- Clade: Angiosperms
- Clade: Eudicots
- Clade: Rosids
- Order: Malpighiales
- Family: Malpighiaceae
- Genus: Aspidopterys
- Species: A. canarensis

Binomial name
- Aspidopterys canarensis Dalzell

= Aspidopterys canarensis =

Species of plant

Aspidopterys canarensis commonly known as the Kanara climber is a liana species endemic to the Western Ghats of India, belonging to the family Malpighiaceae. The species has a restricted natural distribution, occurring only in a few pockets of semi-evergreen forests in Kerala and Karnataka.

== Description ==
Leaves are hairless, ovate to elliptic-lance shaped and long-pointed. Flowers are clustered in slender stalks, borne in leaf axils or leafscars. Bracts and sepals are velvety. Petals are yellow. Samara is nearly circular and papery.

== Phenology ==
Flowering: February-May.
