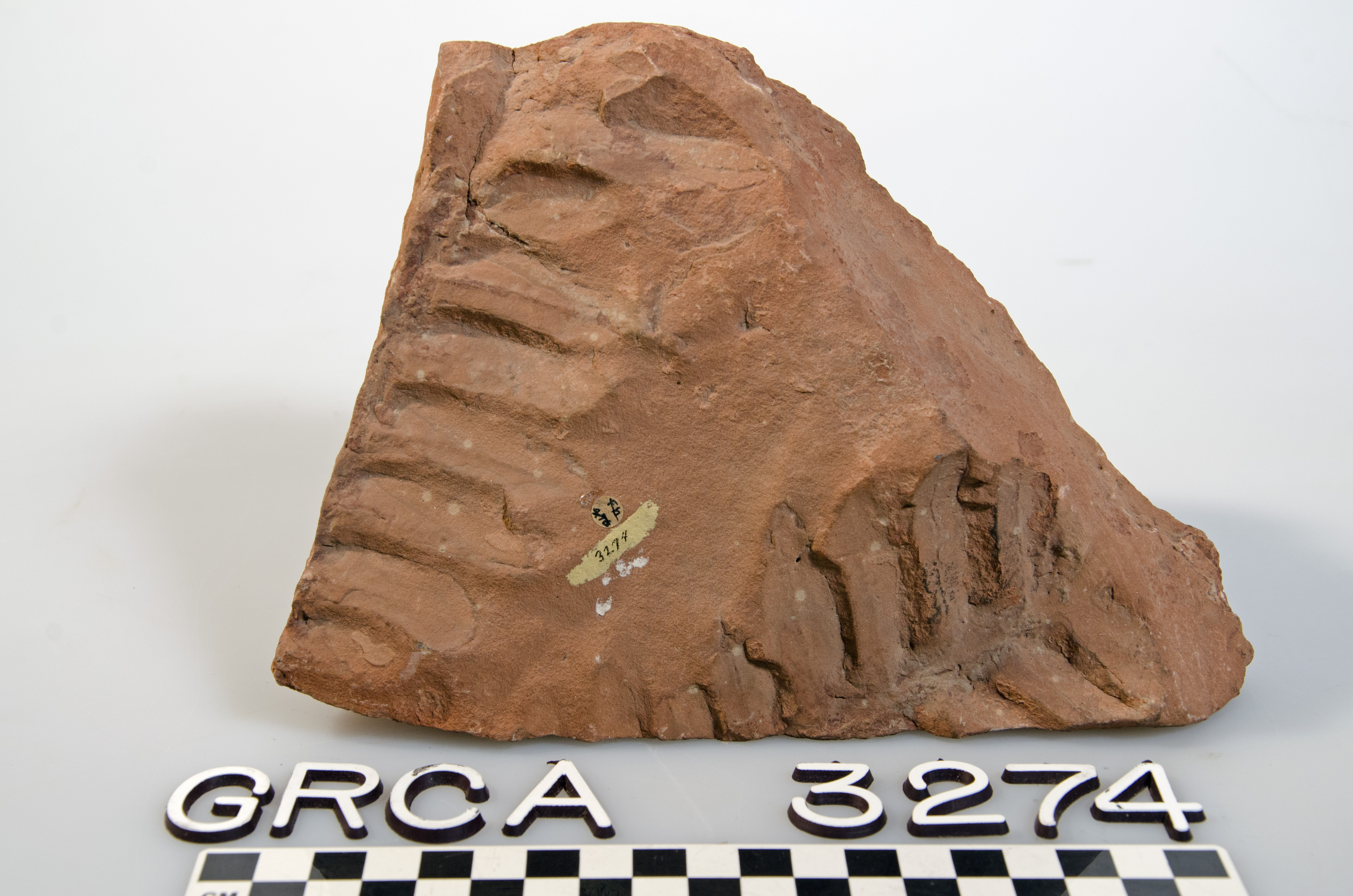
- Supaia sturdevanti

Scientific classification
- Kingdom: Plantae
- Clade: Embryophytes
- Clade: Tracheophytes
- Order: †Peltaspermales (?)
- Genus: †Supaia; C.D.White

Species
- Supaia sturdevanti C.D.White; Supaia thinnfeldioides C.D.White

= Supaia =

Supaia Temporal range: Permian ~Permian

Extinct genus of fern-like plant

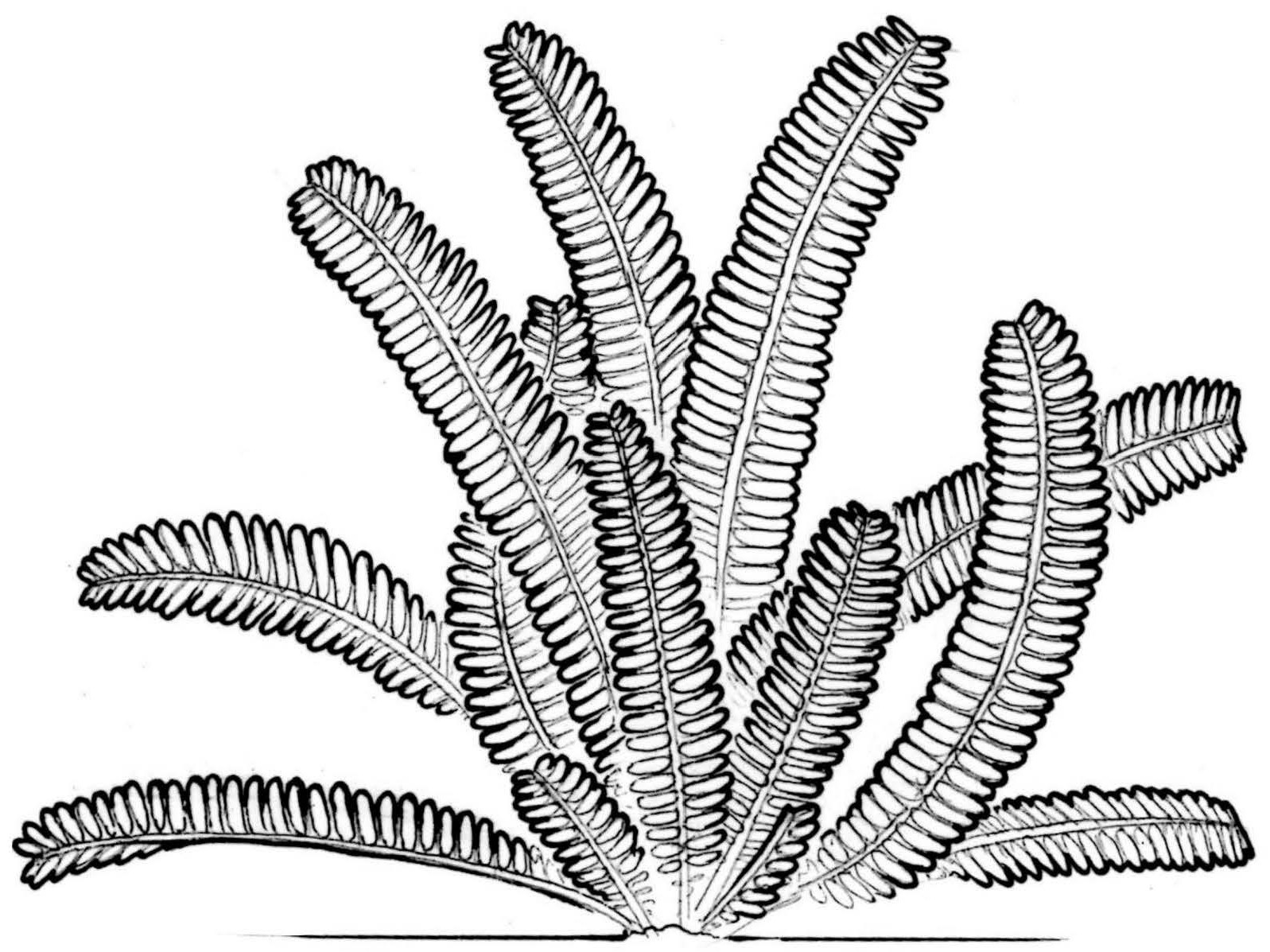
Life restoration

Supaia is an extinct genus of fern-like plants, possibly seed ferns. Species belonging to the genus lived during the Permian in North America, east Asia, and Madagascar. The leaves were adapted to minimize water loss, and the genus is thought to have grown as small trees (up to 4 meters (13 ft) in height) in a mudflat environment subject to frequent drought.
