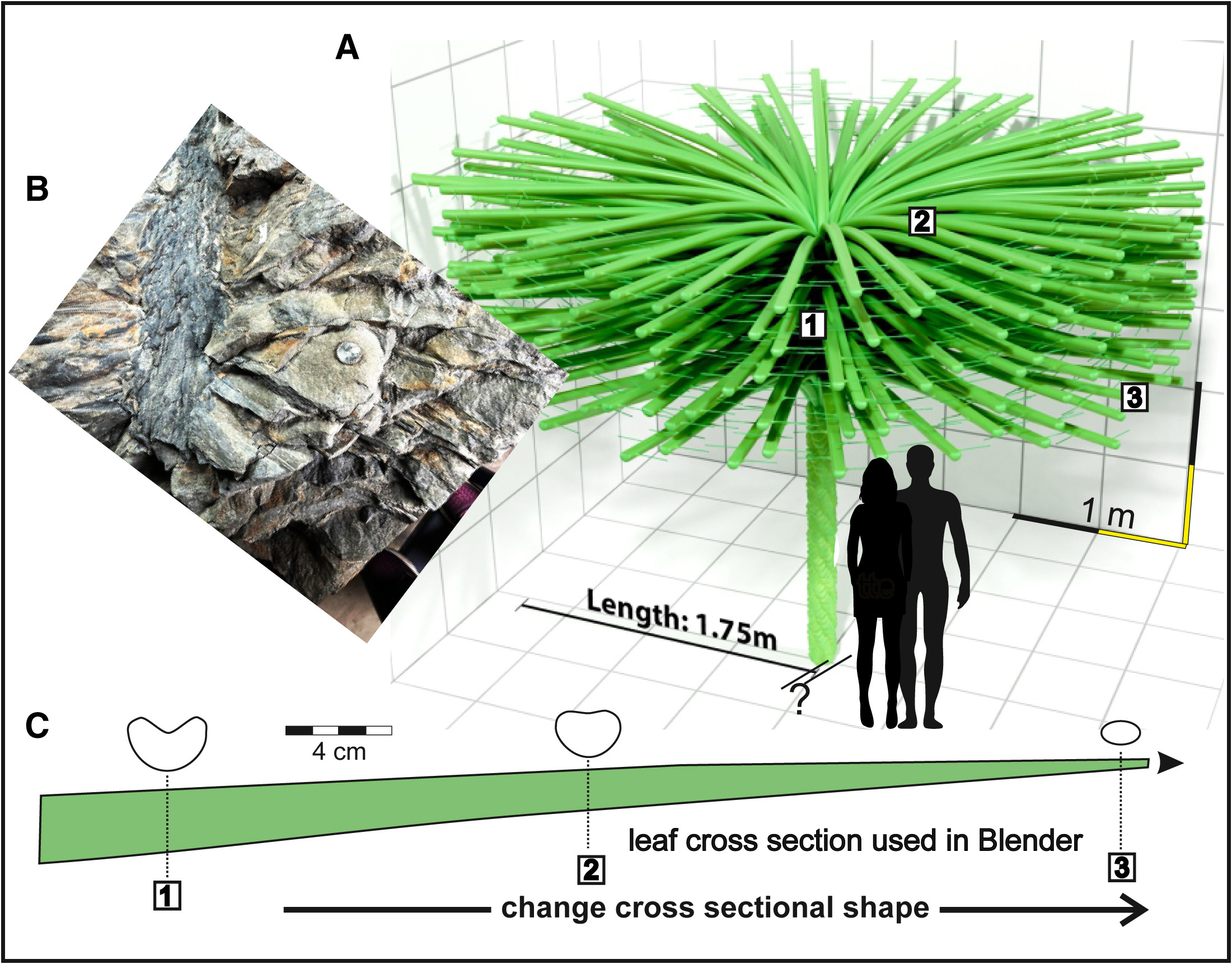
- A reconstruction of Sanfordiacaulis

Scientific classification
- Kingdom: Plantae
- Clade: Tracheophytes
- Order: incertae sedis
- Genus: †Sanfordiacaulis; Gastaldo et al., 2024
- Species: †S. densifolia

Binomial name
- †Sanfordiacaulis densifolia Gastaldo et al., 2024

= Sanfordiacaulis =

Sanfordiacaulis Temporal range: Tournaisian

Extinct genus of Carboniferous plant

Sanfordiacaulis is an enigmatic genus of early Carboniferous plant from New Brunswick, Canada, described in 2024, distinguished by its unusual crown morphology and known from five specimens. It was discovered in 2017 near Norton, now part of Valley Waters. This genus contains one species, Sanfordiacaulis densifolia.

== Description ==
Sanfordiacaulis is an indeterminate vascular plant, roughly 2 m (6 ft 7 in) in height, with a non-woody stem 16 cm (6.3 in) wide and a crown width of 5 to 6 m (16 to 20 ft). Its leaves are arranged in a tightly packed, non-Fibonacci spiral, with the portion of the trunk bearing leaves estimated to have had over 200 laterals based on petiole distribution. The trunk is covered in elliptical leaf bases (not visible on the upper portion due to the leaves obscuring them), with no evidence of a downward-facing leaf skirt like in palm trees. The bases of the petioles are decurrent (extend down the stem) and extend upwards for around 7 cm (2.8 in) before changing their direction further outwards, with the angle becoming sharper towards the tip down to around 20°. On the adaxial (towards the growth axis) surface a large groove is present, decreasing in size towards the tip which changes the cross-section from cordate (heart-shaped) to triangular/oval. These petioles decrease from around 3 cm (1.2 in) across at the trunk to 1.5 cm (0.59 in) at the tip, with the petioles at roughly a 90° angle from the trunk. Secondary laterals start around 50 cm (20 in) from the petiole base, each around 3-4 mm wide and at least 3 to 4 cm (1.2 to 1.6 in) long. The lack of preserved reproductive structures unfortunately means no classification finer than a vascular plant can be determined.

== Etymology ==
Sanfordiacaulis's genus name is derived from the quarry containing the specimens and its owner, Laurie Sanford, whereas its specific name, densifolia is derived from the dense arrangement of leaves.
