= Othniophyton =

Othniophyton Temporal range: Eocene, ~47.33 Ma

Scientific classification
- Kingdom: Plantae
- Clade: Tracheophytes
- Clade: Angiosperms
- Clade: Eudicots
- Clade: Superasterids
- Genus: †Othniophyton; Manchester, Judd & Correa-Narvaez, 2024
- Species: †O. elongatum

Binomial name
- †Othniophyton elongatum Manchester, Judd & Correa-Narvaez, 2024

Synonyms
- Apocynophyllum wilcoxense Berry, 1929; Celastrophyllum lesquereuxii? Berry, 1929; Oreopanax elongatum MacGinitie, 1969; Ternstroemites viridifluminis Berry, 1929

Genus of prehistoric plant

Othniophyton (meaning "strange plant") is an extinct genus of superasterid plant of possible caryophyllalean affinity from the Eocene Green River Formation of Colorado and Utah in the United States. The type species is Othniophyton elongatum, which was initially classified as a species of Oreopanax.

== Discovery and naming ==
The earliest-discovered specimens now identified as belonging to Othniophyton were previously named as Apocynophyllum wilcoxense, Celastrophyllum lesquereuxii, and Ternstroemites viridifluminis in 1929.

The holotype (specimen UCMP 20666) and the paratype (specimen UCMP 20673), which are both single leaves, were identified and described in 1969. The specimens were collected at the Wardell Ranch locality in Colorado, where the Parachute Creek Member of the Green River Formation can be found. The specimens were named by MacGinitie (1969) as Oreopanax elongatum.

Several more specimens were later discovered near the ghost town of Watson, Utah and included isolated leaves alongside specimen UCMP PB 02016-254974, which preserves branches with attached leaves and reproductive organs.

== Classification ==
Othniophyton elongatum was initially placed within the genus Oreopanax within the Arialiaceae by MacGintie (1969). However, after the discovery of more complete specimens, Manchester, Judd & Correa-Narvaez (2024) classified it as a superasterid of possible caryophyllalean affinity.
