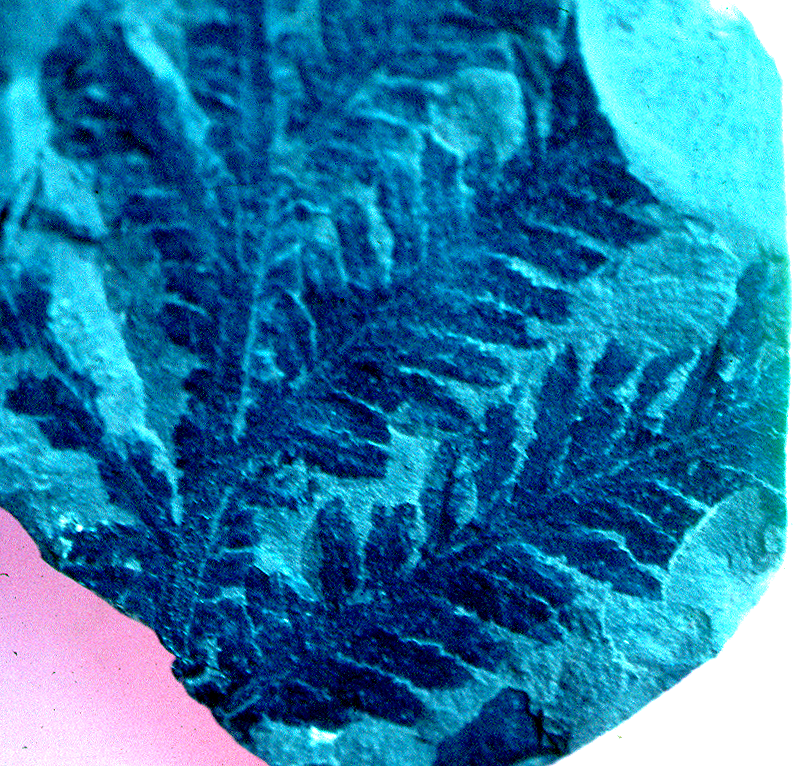
- Lepidopteris madagascariensis leaf, Early Triassic Newport Formation, Bungan Head, New South Wales, Australia.

Scientific classification
- Kingdom: Plantae
- Clade: Tracheophytes
- Order: †Peltaspermales
- Family: †Peltaspermaceae
- Genus: †Lepidopteris; Schimper 1869

Species
- Lepidopteris stuttgardiensis (Jaeger) Schimper 1869 (type); Lepidopteris callipteroides (Carpentier) Retallack 2002; Lepidopteris haizeri Dobruskina 1980; Lepidopteris heterolateralis Dobruskina 1980; Lepidopteris martinsii (Kurtze)Townrow 1960; Lepidopteris microcellularis Dobruskina 1980; Lepidopteris madagascariensis Carpentier 1935; Lepidopteris ottonis (Goeppert) Schimper 1869; Lepidopteris remota (Goeppert) Dobruskina 1980; Lepidopteris scassoi Elgorriaga, Escapa & Cúneo 2019; Lepidopteris stormbergensis (Seward) Townrow 1956

= Lepidopteris =

Lepidopteris Temporal range: Middle Permian–Early Jurassic

Extinct genus of seed ferns

Lepidopteris ("scaly fern") is a form genus for leaves of Peltaspermaceae, an extinct family of seed plants, which lived from around 260 to 190 million years ago, from the Late Permian to Early Jurassic. Fossils of the genus have been found across both hemispheres. Nine species are currently recognized.Lepidopteris was a common and widespread seed fern, which survived the Permian-Triassic extinction event but was largely wiped out by the Triassic-Jurassic extinction event. Lepidopteris callipteroides is especially common between the first two episodes of the Permian-Triassic extinction event, and L. ottonis forms a comparable acme zone immediately before the Triassic-Jurassic extinction event. Lepidopteris would persist into the Early Jurassic in Patagonia, represented by the species Lepidopteris scassoi.

== Description ==
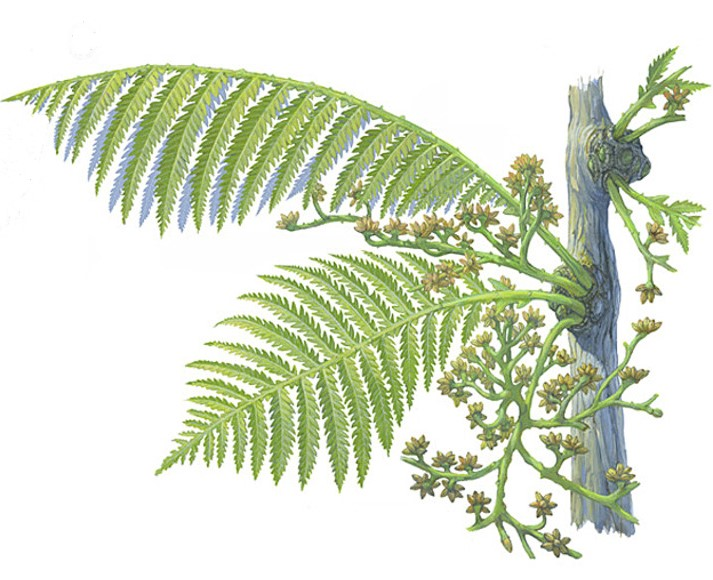
Whole plant reconstruction of Lepidopteris ottonis with Antevsia zeilleri pollen organs, from the Late Triassic of Europe

In the form generic system of paleobotany Lepidopteris is used only for leaves, which are fern-like with pinnules attached to the rachis as well as the pinnae. The cuticle of the leaves is thick and has a distinctive cuticular structure with stomatal opening overhung by papillae. This structure has been used to link the fossil leaves with well-preserved reproductive structures in the same deposits. The ovules are commonly arranged in peltate structures which have been used to assign Lepidopteris to the Order Peltaspermales. Not all leaf species are associated with reproductive material, but well-established associations include the following.

- Lepidopteris ottonis (leaves), Peltaspermum rotula (ovulate structures) and Antevsia zeilleri (pollen organ).
- Lepidopteris stormbergensis (leaves), Peltaspermum thomasii (ovulate structures) and Antevsia extans (pollen organ).
- Lepidopteris callipteroides (leaves), Peltaspermum townrovii (ovulate structures) and Permotheca helbyi (pollen organ).

== Distribution and species ==
Lepidopteris was geographically widespread and ranged from Late Permian to Late Triassic but individual species had more restricted geographic extent and shorter stratigraphic ranges, as seen in the list below in stratigraphic order

- Lepidopteris martinsii from Late Permian of Germany, England and Italy.
- Lepidopteris callipteroides from Late Permian of Madagascar and Australia.
- Lepidopteris madagascariensis from Early Triassic of Madagascar and Australia.
- Lepidopteris stormbergensis from Middle-Late Triassic of South Africa, India, South America and Australia.
- Lepidopteris remota from Middle Triassic of Russia.
- Lepidopteris haizeri from Middle to Late Triassic of Russia
- Lepidopteris heterolateralis from Middle to Late Triassic of Russia.
- Lepidopteris microcellularis from Middle to Late Triassic of Russia.
- Lepidopteris ottonis from Late Triassic of Greenland, Germany, Poland, China and Vietnam.
- Lepidopteris scassoi Early Jurassic of Argentina.

== Atmospheric carbon dioxide paleobarometer ==
The cuticular structure of Lepidopteris is comparable to that of modern Ginkgo, which has been used to estimate past atmospheric carbon dioxide from its stomatal index. Because Lepidopteris and Ginkgo leaves in the same South African fossil quarries have the same stomatal index, the calibration for modern Ginkgo has been used to calculate carbon dioxide levels from Late Permian and Triassic Lepidopteris leaves.
