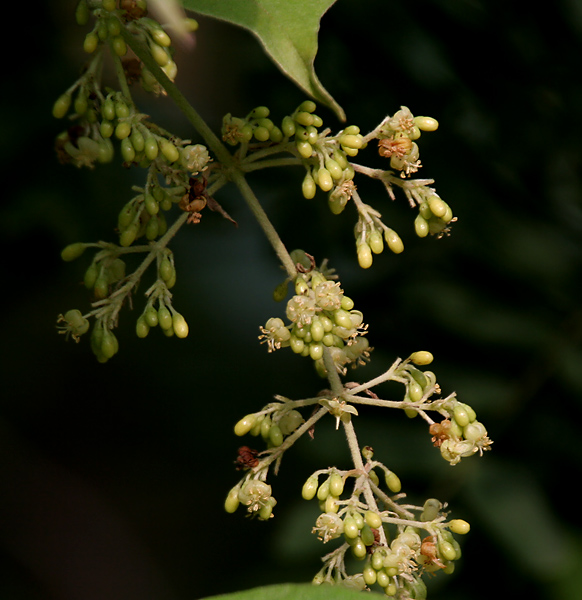
- Aspidopterys cordata (Wall.) A.Juss.

Scientific classification
- Kingdom: Plantae
- Clade: Tracheophytes
- Clade: Angiosperms
- Clade: Eudicots
- Clade: Rosids
- Order: Malpighiales
- Family: Malpighiaceae
- Genus: Aspidopterys; A.Juss.

Species
- ca. 15 species

= Aspidopterys =

Genus of plants

Aspidopterys is a genus of Malpighiaceae, a family of about 75 genera of flowering plants in the order Malpighiales. Aspidopterys comprises approximately 15 species of vine native to Asia.

== Species ==
There are 24 species in this genus according to POWO:

- Aspidopterys albomarginata Hance
- Aspidopterys balakrishnanii R.C.Srivast.
- Aspidopterys canarensis Dalzell
- Aspidopterys cavaleriei H.Lév.
- Aspidopterys celebensis Arènes
- Aspidopterys concava (Wall.) A.Juss.
- Aspidopterys cordata (B.Heyne ex Wall.) A.Juss.
- Aspidopterys elliptica (Blume) A.Juss.
- Aspidopterys esquirolii H.Lév.
- Aspidopterys glabrifolia Arènes
- Aspidopterys glabriuscula A.Juss.
- Aspidopterys harmandiana Pierre
- Aspidopterys henryi Hutch.
- Aspidopterys hirsuta (Wall.) A.Juss.
- Aspidopterys indica (Willd.) W.Theob.
- Aspidopterys jainii R.C.Srivast.
- Aspidopterys microcarpa H.W.Li ex S.K.Chen
- Aspidopterys nutans (Roxb. ex DC.) A.Juss.
- Aspidopterys oligoneura Merr.
- Aspidopterys orbiculata (Roxb. ex Wall.) Nied.
- Aspidopterys oxyphylla A.Juss.
- Aspidopterys thorelii Dop
- Aspidopterys tomentosa (Blume) A.Juss.
- Aspidopterys wallichii Hook.f.
