= Xenofructus =

Xenofructus Temporal range: Middle Jurassic

Scientific classification
- Kingdom: Plantae
- Clade: Tracheophytes
- Clade: Spermatophytes
- Clade: Angiosperms (?)
- Genus: †Xenofructus; Fu et al., 2024
- Species: †X. dabuensis

Binomial name
- †Xenofructus dabuensis Fu et al., 2024

Extinct genus of plants

Xenofructus is an extinct genus of plant known from the Middle Jurassic of China. It may have been an early angiosperm. There is only one species assigned to the genus, Xenofructus dabuensis which was discovered in the Dabu Formation.

== Description ==
Xenofructus is distinguished by a fruit or ovary borne on a short stalk, exhibiting a straight abaxial surface and a convex adaxial surface. A pronounced ridge is present along the abaxial side. The placenta is not attached to either the abaxial or adaxial margins of the fruit or ovary. Ovules are enclosed within the fruit or ovary, occurring in clustered arrangements and possessing a sickle-like shape.
