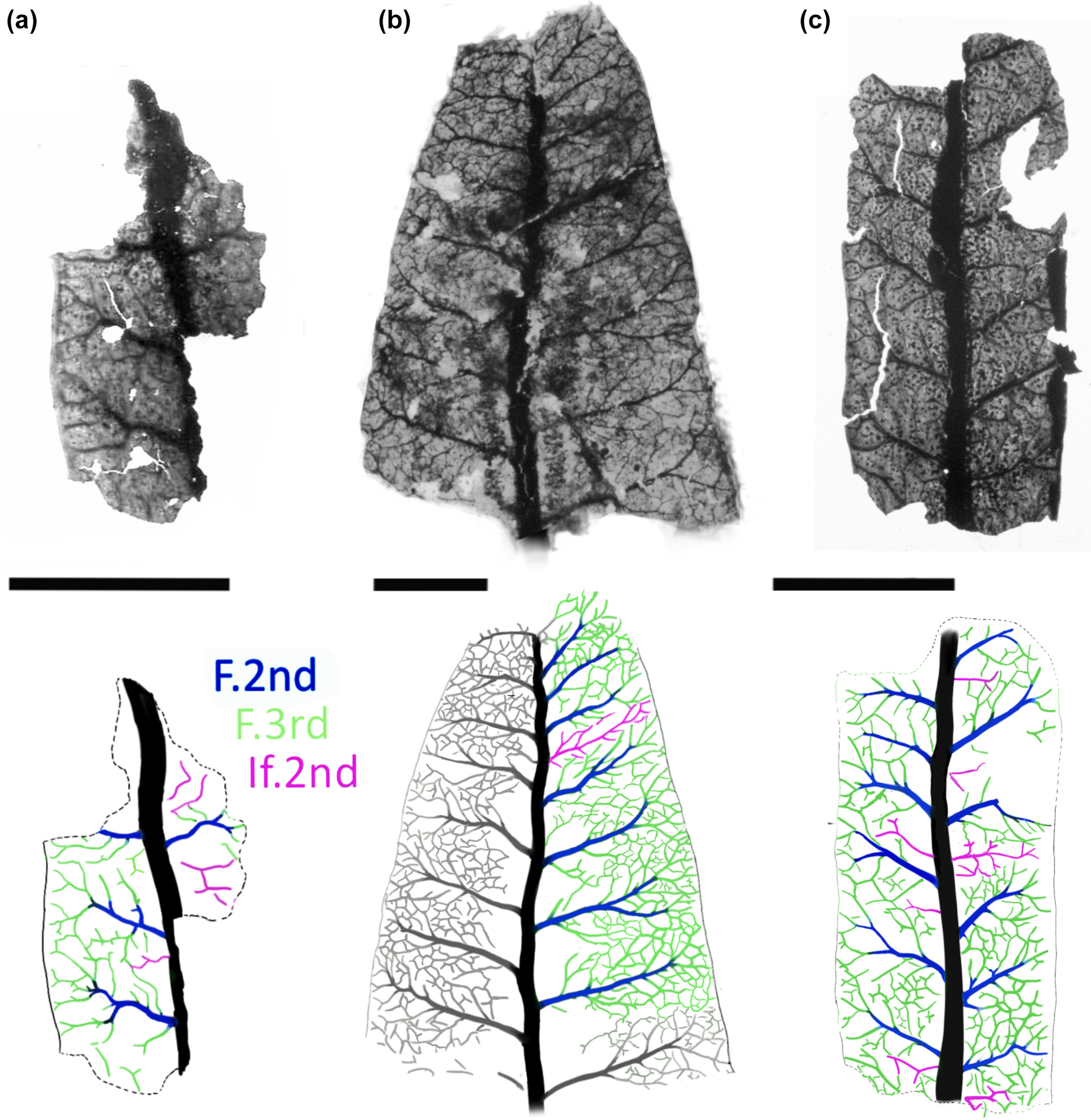
- Venation plus diagrams interpreting the venation of Furcula

Scientific classification
- Kingdom: Plantae
- Clade: Tracheophytes
- Order: †Peltaspermales
- Genus: †Furcula; Harris, 1932
- Species: †F. granulifer

Binomial name
- †Furcula granulifer Harris, 1932

= Furcula granulifer =

Furcula granulifer Temporal range: Late Triassic (Rhaetian), 201 Ma

Extinct genus of plants

Furcula is a genus of extinct plant from Late Triassic Greenland. It contains one species, F. granulifer. The leaves of Furcula have complex net-like veins like those of angiosperms (flowering plants); because of this, it was long considered a possible stem-group angiosperm. However, a recent reinvestigation suggests it is a peltasperm (a type of "seed fern") that convergently evolved angiosperm-like veins.

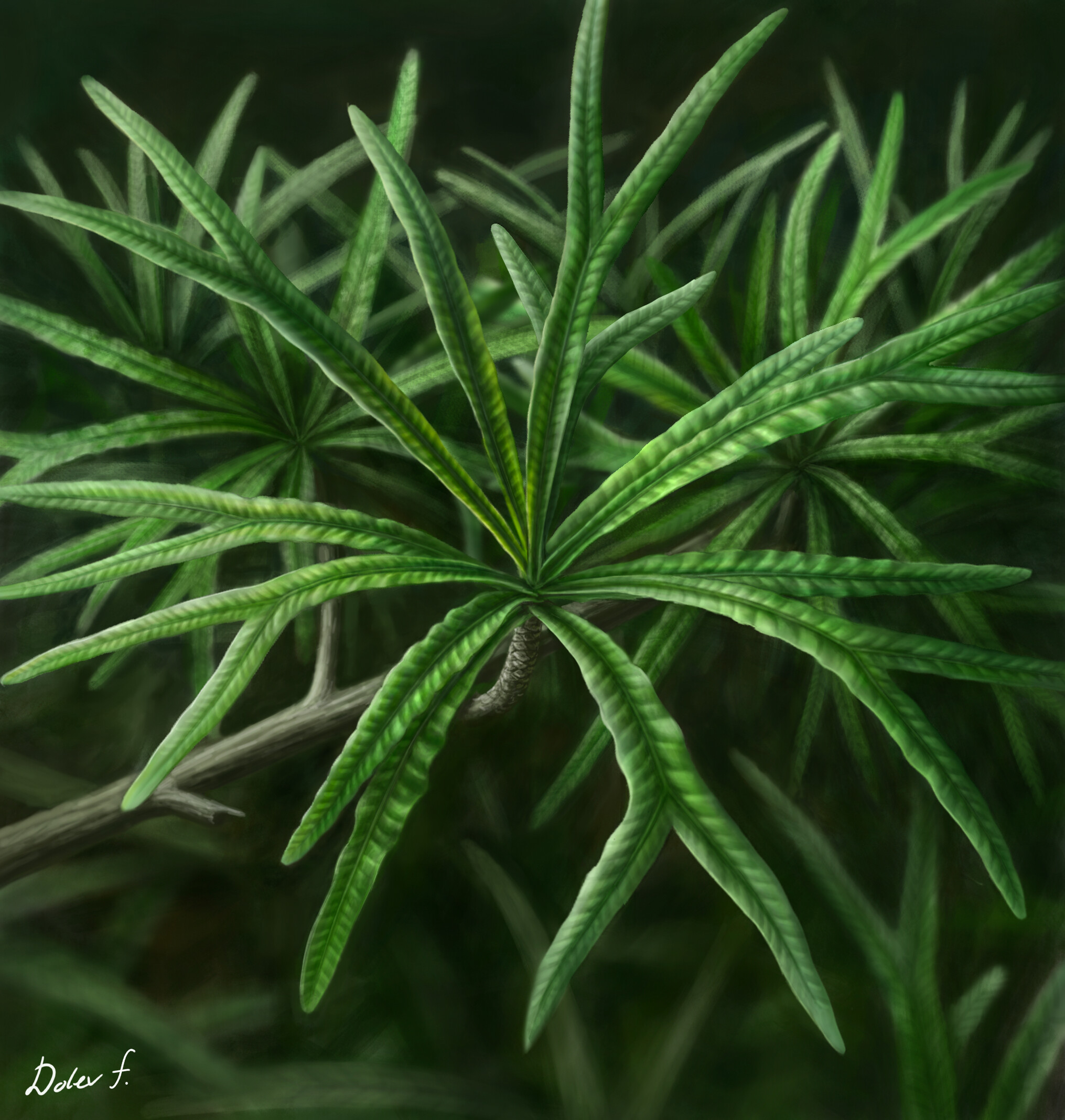
Artistic reconstruction of the Furcula granulifer plant
