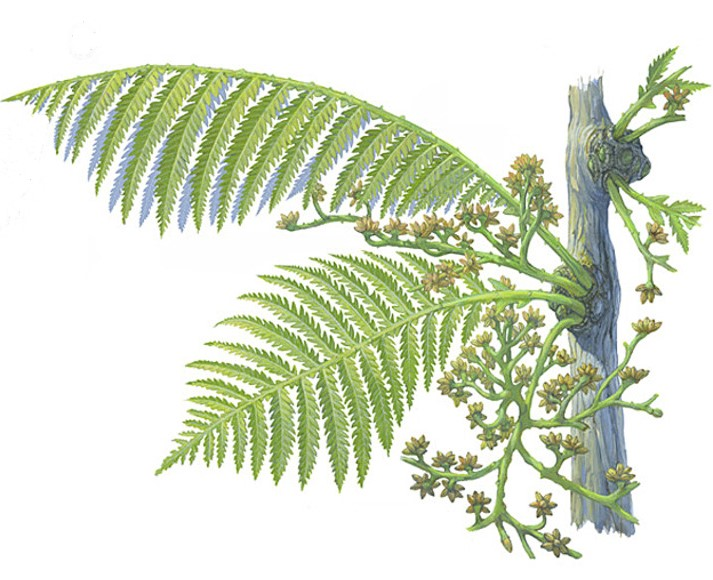
- Life restoration of the Lepidopteris plant, with Lepidopteris ottonis foliage and Antevsia zeilleri pollen-producing microsporophylls, from the Late Triassic of Europe
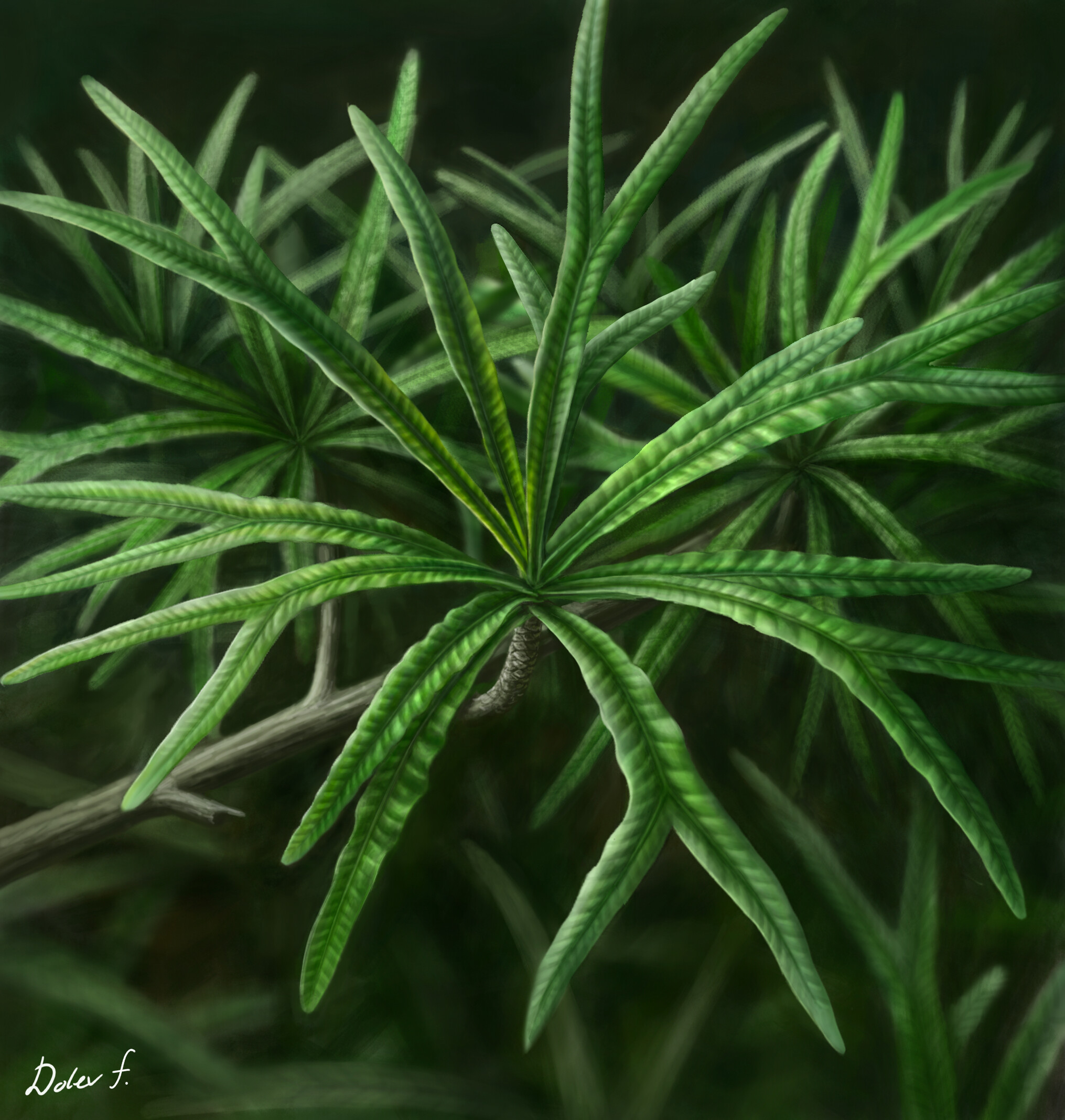
- Life restoration of Furcula granulifer from the Late Triassic of Greenland

Scientific classification
- Kingdom: Plantae
- Clade: Tracheophytes
- Clade: Spermatophytes
- Order: †Peltaspermales; Delevoryas 1979

Families and genera
- See text

= Peltaspermales =

Peltaspermales Temporal range: Late Carboniferous–Early Jurassic Some specimens From the Jurassic-Cretaceous boundary of Australia may belong to the Group

Extinct order of seed ferns

The Peltaspermales are an extinct order of seed plants, often considered "seed ferns". They span from the Late Carboniferous to the Early Jurassic or the Jurassic-Cretaceous Boundary. It includes at least one valid family, Peltaspermaceae, which spans from the Permian to Early Jurassic, which is typified by a group of plants with Lepidopteris leaves, Antevsia pollen-organs, and Peltaspermum ovulate organs, though the family now also includes other genera like Peltaspermopsis, Meyenopteris and Scytophyllum. Along with these, two informal groups (the "Supaioids" and the "Comioids") of uncertain taxonomic affinities exist, each centered around a specific genus; Supaia and Comia, known from the Early Permian of the Northern Hemisphere, especially of North America. Both the "Comioids" and the "Supaioids" are associated with the peltaspermacean ovulate organ Autunia (also known as Sandrewia). The Late Triassic-Middle Jurassic genus Pachydermophyllum may also have affinities to the peltasperms.

The morphology of peltasperm leaves is highly variable, ranging from dissected pinnate (fern-like) to forked and simple morphologies. The leaves of many peltasperms have "monocyclic stomata with wedge-shaped subsidiaries ending in a beak-like papilla overarching the guard cells", something which is found among other seed plant groups. The seed-bearing organs are generally fan-shaped or peltate.

It is unclear whether the broad grouping of peltasperms as a whole is monophyletic. Some authors have suggested that some peltasperms may have close affinities to corystosperms, another group of extinct "seed ferns". Meyen (1987) argued that Peltaspermales were ancestral to Ginkgoales, due to similarities between certain peltasperm form genera (Tatarina, Kirjamkenia, Stiphorus, Antevsia) and the extinct ginkgo Glossophyllum, and grouped peltasperms with Ginkgoales as part of Ginkgoopsida. Later authors have considered the position of Peltaspermales within seed plants to be uncertain.

It is suggested that at least some peltasperms may have been insect pollinated, with Pemian members of the long-probiscis scorpionfly family Protomeropidae from Russia associated with peltasperm pollen. The insects are suggested to have fed on pollination drops produced by peltasperm reproductive organs.

== Evolutionary history ==
During the late Paleozoic, peltasperms are primarily known from the Northern Hemisphere, with Lepidopteris first appearing in the region during the Late Permian. During the Triassic, Lepidopteris became globally distributed and was abundant, especially during the Late Triassic. Lepidopteris populations collapsed during the end-Triassic mass extinction, with small populations persisting in Patagonia into the Early Jurassic. The genus Pachydermophyllum, along specimens referred as Lepidopteris? from the Battle Camp Formation of Clack Island, of latest Jurassic or earliest Cretaceous age may indicate an even longer survival in Gondwana.

== Families, genera, and other groupings ==
- Family Peltaspermaceae
  - Lepidopteris (leaves)
  - Antevsia (pollen organs)
  - Peltaspermum (ovulate organ)
  - Peltaspermopsis (ovulate organ)
  - Meyenopteris (ovulate organ)
  - Kirjamkenia (leaves)
  - Scytophyllum (leaves)
  - Tatarina (leaves)
- "Supaioids"
  - Supaia (leaves)
  - Glenopteris (leaves)
  - Compsopteris (leaves)
  - Brongniartites (leaves)
- "Comioids"
  - Comia (leaves)
  - Auritifolia (leaves)
- Autunia (ovulate organ, formerly Sandrewia)
- Autuniopsis (ovulate organ)
- Lopadiangium (ovulate organ)
- Navipelta (ovulate organ)
- Permoxylocarpus (ovulate organ)
- Sporophyllites (ovulate organ)
- Stiphorus (ovulate organ)
- Tinsleya (ovulate organ)
- Pachydermophyllum? (leaves)
- Vittaephyllum (leaves)
- Taimyria (ovulate organ)
- Furcula (leaves)
- Matatiellaceae? (Other authors consider this family to be incertae sedis within seed plants)
  - Dejerseya (leaves)
  - Matatiella (ovulate organ)
