= 2014 in paleobotany =

This article records new taxa of plants that were described during the year 2014, as well as other significant discoveries and events related to paleobotany that occurred in the year 2014.

== Chlorophytes ==
Name	Novelty	Status	Authors	Age	Unit	Location	Notes	Images
Andreiella	Gen. et sp. nov	Valid	Bucur	Early Cretaceous (Barremian–?Aptian)		Romania	A dasycladalean alga belonging to the family Triploporellaceae. Genus includes new species A. rajkae.	
Belzungia barattoloi	Sp. nov	Valid	Radoičić & Özgen-Erdem	Early Eocene		Turkey	A dasycladalean alga belonging to the family Thyrsoporellaceae.	
Boueina iberica	Sp. nov	Valid	Schlagintweit & Wilmsen	Late Cretaceous (Cenomanian)	Altamira Formation	Spain	A dasycladalean alga belonging to the family Udoteaceae.	
Clypeina tibanai	Sp. nov	Valid	Granier, Dias-Brito & Bucur	Cretaceous (Albian–Cenomanian)	Ponta do Mel Formation	Brazil	A dasycladalean alga belonging to the family Polyphysaceae.	
Diplopora obliguspora	Sp. nov	Valid	Senowbari-Daryan	Late Triassic (Norian-Rhaetian)		Greece	A dasycladalean alga belonging to the family Diploporellaceae.	
Probolocupsis sarmeikensis	Sp. nov	Valid	Senowbari-Daryan	Late Triassic (Norian-Rhaetian)		Greece	A dasycladalean alga belonging to the family Triploporellaceae. Originally described as a species of Probolocupsis; Senowbari-Daryan (2018) transferred this species to the genus Naybandoporella.	
Probolocuspis? tenuiparia	Sp. nov	Valid	Senowbari-Daryan	Late Triassic (Norian-Rhaetian)		Greece	A dasycladalean alga belonging to the family Triploporellaceae.	
Russoella parthica	Sp. nov	Valid	Barattolo, Taherpour Khalil Abad & Ashrafi	Late Cretaceous (Maastrichtian)		Afghanistan	A dasycladalean alga.	

== Ferns ==
Name	Novelty	Status	Authors	Age	Unit	Location	Notes	Images
Arcellites punctatus	Sp. nov	Valid	Friis, Pedersen & Marone	Early Cretaceous (late Barremian–early Aptian)	Almargem Formation	Portugal	A member of Salviniales of uncertain phylogenetic placement, a species of Arcellites.	
Ashicaulis plumites	Sp. nov	Valid	Tian & Wang in Tian et al.	Middle Jurassic	Tiaojishan Formation	China	A member of Osmundaceae. Originally described as a species of Ashicaulis; transferred to the genus Claytosmunda by Bomfleur, Grimm & McLoughlin (2017).	
Ashicaulis wangii	Sp. nov	Valid	Tian et al.	Middle Jurassic	Tiaojishan Formation	China	A member of Osmundaceae. Originally described as a species of Ashicaulis; transferred to the genus Claytosmunda by Bomfleur, Grimm & McLoughlin (2017).	
Chiropteris monteagnellii	Sp. nov	Valid	Kustatscher, Dellantonio & Van Konijnenburg-Van Cittert	Middle Triassic (Ladinian)		Italy	A pteridophyte of uncertain phylogenetic placement, a species of Chiropteris.	
Cladophlebis ladinica	Sp. nov	Valid	Kustatscher, Dellantonio & Van Konijnenburg-Van Cittert	Middle Triassic (Ladinian)		Italy	A pteridophyte of uncertain phylogenetic placement, a species of Cladophlebis.	
Elaphoglossum miocenicum	Sp. nov	Valid	Lóriga et al.	Miocene		Dominican Republic	A member of Dryopteridaceae found in Dominican amber, a species of Elaphoglossum.	
Flabellariopteris	Gen. et sp. nov	Valid	Sun in Sun et al.	Late Triassic	Yangcaogou Formation	China	A member of Marsileaceae. The type species is Flabellariopteris mii.	
Lugiomarsiglia	Gen. et sp. nov	Valid	Hermsen, Gandolfo & Cúneo	Late Cretaceous (Campanian–Maastrichtian)	La Colonia Formation	Argentina	A member of the family Marsileaceae. Genus includes new species L. aquatica.	
Marattiopsis vodrazkae	Sp. nov.	Valid	Kvaček	Late Cretaceous (Campanian)	Hidden Lake Formation	Antarctica (James Ross Island)	A member of Marattiaceae, a species of Marattiopsis.	
Marsilea patnii	Sp. nov	Valid	Patil, Kapgate & Zilpe	Late Cretaceous	Deccan Intertrappean Beds	India	A species of Marsilea.	
Mirasolita	Gen. et sp. nov	Valid	Hermsen, Gandolfo & Cúneo	Late Cretaceous (Campanian–Maastrichtian)	La Colonia Formation	Argentina	A member of the family Marsileaceae. Genus includes new species M. irupensis.	
Phlebopteris fiemmensis	Sp. nov	Valid	Kustatscher, Dellantonio & Van Konijnenburg-Van Cittert	Middle Triassic (Ladinian)		Italy	A member of Matoniaceae, a species of Phlebopteris.	
Phlebopteris hickeyi	Sp. nov	Valid	Hu & Taylor	Early Cretaceous (Albian)	Jarash Formation	Jordan	A member of Matoniaceae, a species of Phlebopteris.	
Pseudobornia schweitzeri	Sp. nov	Valid	Jurina & Orlova in Orlova & Jurina	Late Devonian		Russia	A species of Pseudobornia.	
Salvinia hainanensis	Sp. nov	Valid	Jin & Wang in Wang, Xu & Jin	Eocene		China	A species of Salvinia.	
Tiania	Gen. et comb. nov	Valid	Wang et al.	Late Permian	Xuanwei Formation	China	A member of Guaireaceae (extinct family belonging to the order Osmundales); a new genus for "Palaeosmunda" yunnanense Tian & Chang (1995).	
Zhongmingella	Gen. et comb. nov	Valid	Wang et al.	Late Permian	Wangjiazhai Formation	China	A member of Guaireaceae (extinct family belonging to the order Osmundales); a new genus for "Palaeosmunda" plenasioides Li (1983).	

== Ginkgophyta ==
=== Ginkgophytes ===
Name	Novelty	Status	Authors	Age	Unit	Location	Notes	Images
Flabellosemen	Gen. et sp. nov	Valid	Tsymbal	Permian		Russia	A Psygmophyllaceae Ginkgoales. The type species is F. riparium.	
Ginkgo chlonoviae	Sp. nov	Valid	Nosova & Golovneva	Early Cretaceous (Albian)	Kiya Formation	Russia	A species of Ginkgo.	
Ginkgo sertensis	Sp. nov	Valid	Nosova & Golovneva	Early Cretaceous (Albian)	Kiya Formation	Russia	A species of Ginkgo.	
Ginkgoxylpropinquus saxonicum	Sp. nov	Valid	Süss & Müller	Early Oligocene		Germany	A member of Ginkgoales, a species of Ginkgoxylpropinquus.	

== Conifers ==
=== Pinales ===
Name	Novelty	Status	Authors	Age	Unit	Location	Notes	Images
Agathis zamunerae	Sp. nov	Valid	Wilf et al.	Eocene	Ligorio Márquez Formation	Argentina	A member of Araucariaceae, a species of Agathis.	
Araucarites ochotensis	Sp. nov	Valid	Golovneva & Shczepetov in Shczepetov & Golovneva	Late Cretaceous		Russia	A member of Araucariaceae, a species of Araucarites.	
Athrotaxites yumenensis	Sp. nov	Valid	Dong et al.	Early Cretaceous	Zhonggou Formation	China	A member of Cupressaceae, a species of Athrotaxites.	
Elatides zhoui	Sp. nov	Valid	Shi et al.	Early Cretaceous		Mongolia	A member of Cupressaceae, a species of Elatides.	
Elatocladus andhrensis	Sp. nov	Valid	Chinnappa, Rajanikanth & Rao	Early Cretaceous	Gangapur Formation	India	A member of Coniferales, a species of Elatocladus.	
Hubbardiastrobus	Gen. et sp. nov	Valid	Atkinson, Rothwell & Stockey	Early Cretaceous (Valanginian)		Canada	A member of Cupressaceae. The type species is Hubbardiastrobus cunninghamioides.	
Hughmillerites vancouverensis	Sp. nov	Valid	Atkinson, Rothwell & Stockey	Early Cretaceous		Canada	A member of Cupressaceae, a species of Hughmillerites.	
Pararaucaria collinsonae	Sp. nov	Valid	Steart, Spencer, Kenrick, Needham & Hilton in Steart et al.	Late Jurassic (Tithonian)	Lulworth Formation	United Kingdom	A member of Cheirolepidiaceae, a species of Pararaucaria.	
Phyllocladoxylon pooleae	Sp.nov	Valid	Pujana, Santillana & Marenssi	Eocene	La Meseta Formation	Antarctica	A member of Podocarpaceae, a species of Phyllocladoxylon.	
Platycladus yunnanensis	Sp. nov	Valid	Wu in Wu et al.	Late Miocene	Nanlin Formation	China	A member of Cupressaceae, a species of Platycladus.	
Podocarpoxylon radiciforme	Sp. nov	Valid	Süss & Müller	Early Oligocene		Germany	A conifer, a species of Podocarpoxylon.	
Protophyllocladoxylon francisiae	Sp.nov	Valid	Pujana, Santillana & Marenssi	Eocene	La Meseta Formation	Antarctica	A member of Podocarpaceae, a species of Protophyllocladoxylon.	

=== Other conifers ===
Name	Novelty	Status	Authors	Age	Unit	Location	Notes	Images
Cordaites barthelii	Sp. nov	Valid	Šimůnek	Carboniferous (Stephanian)		Czech Republic	A species of Cordaites.	
Giblingodendron	Gen. et 2 sp.nov	Valid	Falcon-Lang, Kurzawe & Lucas	Carboniferous (Kasimovian) to Permian (Sakmarian)	Atrasado Formation; Community Pit Formation	United States	A member of Coniferopsida of uncertain phylogenetic placement, might be a member of Voltziales, Cordaitales or Dicranophyllales. The type species is Giblingodendron nudifolia; genus also includes Giblingodendron aridus.	
Macdonaldodendron	Gen. et sp.nov	Valid	Falcon-Lang, Kurzawe & Lucas	Carboniferous (Kasimovian) to Permian (Sakmarian)	Atrasado Formation; Community Pit Formation	United States	A member of Voltziales. The type species is Macdonaldodendron giganticus.	
Manifera	Gen. et sp. nov	Valid	Looy & Stevenson	Permian (Kungurian to Roadian)	Flowerpot Shale Member of the San Angelo Formation	United States	A member of Voltziales belonging to the family Majonicaceae. The type species is Manifera talaris.	
Septomedullopitys szei	Sp. nov	Valid	Wan, Yang & Wang	Late Permian (early Wuchiapingian)	Wutonggou Formation	China	A member of Coniferopsida, a species of Septomedullopitys.	
Shimakuroxylon	Gen. et comb. nov	Valid	Philippe et al.	Jurassic and Cretaceous		Cambodia; China; Indonesia; Japan; Thailand; Vietnam	A gymnosperm described on the basis of fossil wood, possibly a member of Pinophyta. A new genus for "Dadoxylon" japonicum Shimakura (1936).	

== Angiosperms ==
=== Magnoliids ===
Name	Novelty	Status	Authors	Age	Unit	Location	Notes	Images
Annona eocenica	Sp. nov	Valid	Prasad, Singh & Singh	Early Eocene	Cambay Shale Formation	India	A member of Annonaceae, a species of Annona.	
Annona vastanensis	Sp. nov	Valid	Prasad, Singh & Singh	Early Eocene	Cambay Shale Formation	India	A member of Annonaceae, a species of Annona.	
Cinnamomum palaeobejolghota	Sp. nov	Valid	Khan & Bera	Middle to late Miocene	Dafla Formation	India	A member of Lauraceae, a species of Cinnamomum.	
Hexagyne philippiana	Gen. et sp. nov	Valid	Coiffard, Mohr & Bernardes-de-Oliveira	Early Cretaceous (Aptian)	Crato Formation	Brazil	A member of Piperales, probably related to Aristolochiaceae. The type species is Hexagyne philippiana.	
Laurophyllum cinnamomoides	Sp. nov	Valid	Shi, Xie & Li	Oligocene	Ningming Formation	China	A member of Lauraceae described on the basis of fossil leaves.	
Laurophyllum gengjiaoae	Sp. nov	Valid	Shi, Xie & Li	Oligocene	Ningming Formation	China	A member of Lauraceae described on the basis of fossil leaves.	
Laurophyllum grandifolia	Sp. nov	Valid	Shi, Xie & Li	Oligocene	Ningming Formation	China	A member of Lauraceae described on the basis of fossil leaves.	
Laurophyllum huashanense	Sp. nov	Valid	Shi, Xie & Li	Oligocene	Ningming Formation	China	A member of Lauraceae described on the basis of fossil leaves.	
Laurophyllum mingjiangense	Sp. nov	Valid	Shi, Xie & Li	Oligocene	Ningming Formation	China	A member of Lauraceae described on the basis of fossil leaves.	
Laurophyllum ningmingense	Sp. nov	Valid	Shi, Xie & Li	Oligocene	Ningming Formation	China	A member of Lauraceae described on the basis of fossil leaves.	
Laurophyllum papillatum	Sp. nov	Valid	Shi, Xie & Li	Oligocene	Ningming Formation	China	A member of Lauraceae described on the basis of fossil leaves.	
Laurophyllum trichophorum	Sp. nov	Valid	Shi, Xie & Li	Oligocene	Ningming Formation	China	A member of Lauraceae described on the basis of fossil leaves.	
Lindera neobifaria	Sp. nov	Valid	Khan & Bera	Pliocene	Subansiri Formation	India	A member of Lauraceae, a species of Lindera.	
Microlaurus	Gen. et sp. nov	Valid	Takahashi et al.	Late Cretaceous (early Coniacian)	Ashizawa Formation	Japan	A member of Lauraceae. The type species is Microlaurus perigynus.	
Persea mioparviflora	Sp. nov	Valid	Khan & Bera	Pliocene	Subansiri Formation	India	A member of Lauraceae. Described by Khan & Bera (2014) as a species of Persea, considered by the authors to be most similar to the species Persea parviflora Spreng.	
Persea preglaucescens	Sp. nov	Valid	Khan & Bera	Pliocene	Subansiri Formation	India	A member of Lauraceae. Described by Khan & Bera (2014) as a species of Persea, though the authors consider it most similar to the species Persea glaucescens (Nees) D.G. Long, assigned by other authors to the genus Machilus.	

=== Monocots ===
Name	Novelty	Status	Authors	Age	Unit	Location	Notes	Images
Aquaephyllum	Gen. et sp. nov	Valid	Gallego et al.	Late Cretaceous (Maastrichtian)	La Colonia Formation	Argentina	A member of Araceae. The type species is Aquaephyllum auriculatum.	
Cocos binoriensis	Sp. nov	Valid	Srivastava & Srivastava	Late Cretaceous or Paleocene (Maastrichtian-Danian)	Deccan Intertrappean Beds	India	A member of Arecaceae, a relative of the coconut tree.	
Cratosmilax	Gen. et sp. nov	Valid	De Lima et al.	Early Cretaceous (Aptian-Albian)	Crato Formation	Brazil	A member of Smilacaceae. The type species is Cratosmilax jacksoni.	
Liliacidites contortus	Sp. nov	Valid	Mildenhall & Bannister in Conran et al.	Latest Oligocene to earliest Miocene		New Zealand	A morphospecies described on the basis of pollen recovered from a Luzuriaga-like flower.	
Luzuriaga peterbannisteri	Sp. nov	Valid	Conran, Bannister, Mildenhall & Lee in Conran et al.	Latest Oligocene to earliest Miocene		New Zealand	A species of Luzuriaga.	
Palmoxylon romeroi	Sp. nov	Valid	Franco, Brea & Herbst	Late Miocene	Chiquimil Formation	Argentina	A palm tree, a species of Palmoxylon.	
Ripogonum americanum	Sp. nov	Valid	Carpenter et al.	Early Eocene	Laguna del Hunco Formation	Argentina	A member of Liliales, a species of Ripogonum.	
Sabalites dindoriensis	Sp. nov	Valid	Srivastava, Srivastava & Dilcher	Late Cretaceous (Maastrichtian) to early Paleocene (Danian)	Deccan Intertrappean Beds	India	A palm tree belonging to the subfamily Coryphoideae, a species of Sabalites.	

=== Basal eudicots ===
==== Proteales ====
Name	Novelty	Status	Authors	Age	Unit	Location	Notes	Images
Ambiplatanus	Gen. et sp. nov	Valid	Mindell, Karafit & Stockey	Late Cretaceous (Coniacian)		Canada	A member of Platanaceae. The type species is Ambiplatanus washingtonensis.	
Macginitiea nascens	Sp. nov	Valid	Peppe & Hickey	Paleocene	Fort Union Formation	United States	A member of Platanaceae, a species of Macginitiea.	
Meliosma thriviensis	Sp. nov	Valid	Peppe & Hickey	Paleocene	Fort Union Formation	United States	A member of Sabiaceae, a species of Meliosma.	
Meliosma vandaelium	Sp. nov	Valid	Peppe & Hickey	Paleocene	Fort Union Formation	United States	A member of Sabiaceae, a species of Meliosma.	

==== Ranunculales ====
Name	Novelty	Status	Authors	Age	Unit	Location	Notes	Images
Kajanthus	Gen. et sp. nov	Valid	Mendes et al.	Early Cretaceous (late Aptian–early Albian)	Figueira da Foz Formation	Portugal	A member of Lardizabalaceae. The type species is Kajanthus lusitanicus.	
Menispermites lebedevii	Sp. nov	Valid	Moiseeva	Late Cretaceous (Santonian–Campanian)	Emuneret Formation	Russia	A flowering plant described on the basis of fossil leaves.	

=== Superasterids ===
Name	Novelty	Status	Authors	Age	Unit	Location	Notes	Images
Alangium enspelense	Sp. nov	Valid	Köhler in Köhler & Uhl	Late Oligocene		Germany	A species of Alangium.	
Ruprechtioxylon	Gen. et sp. nov	Valid	Cevallos-Ferriz, Martínez-Cabrera & Calvillo-Canadell	Early Miocene	El Cien Formation	Mexico	A member of Polygonaceae described on the basis of fossil wood. Genus includes new species R. multiseptatus.	
Schimoxylon benderi	Sp. nov	Valid	Licht, Boura & De Franceschi in Licht et al.	Eocene	Pondaung Formation	Myanmar	A member of Theaceae, a species of Schimoxylon.	
Ternstromites paucimissouriensis	Sp. nov	Valid	Peppe & Hickey	Paleocene	Fort Union Formation	United States	A member of Theaceae, a species of Ternstromites.	

=== Superrosids ===
==== Saxifragales ====
Name	Novelty	Status	Authors	Age	Unit	Location	Notes	Images
Trochodendroides deminii	Sp. nov	Valid	Yudova & Golovneva	Late Cretaceous (Coniacian)	Chingandzha Formation	Russia	A member of Cercidiphyllaceae.	
Trochodendroides tumanensis	Sp. nov	Valid	Yudova in Yudova & Golovneva	Late Cretaceous (Coniacian)	Chingandzha Formation	Russia	A member of Cercidiphyllaceae.	

==== Fabids ====
Name	Novelty	Status	Authors	Age	Unit	Location	Notes	Images
Bridelia makumensis	Sp. nov	Valid	Srivastava & Mehrotra	Oligocene (Chattian)	Tikak Parbat Formation	India	A member of Phyllanthaceae, a species of Bridelia.	
Caesalpinia veraechinataformis	Sp. nov	Valid	Bernardes-de-Oliveira et al.	Eocene-Oligocene	Entre-Córregos Formation	Brazil	A species of Caesalpinia.	
Cascadiacarpa exilis	Sp. nov	Valid	Mindell, Stockey & Beard	Eocene		Canada	A member of Fagaceae, a species of Cascadiacarpa.	
Castanopsis presclerophylla	Sp. nov	Valid	Wu et al.	Late Pliocene		China	A member of Fagaceae, a species of Castanopsis.	
Cucurbitaciphyllum	Gen. et comb. nov.	Valid	Manchester	Paleocene		United States	A cucurbitacean genus. A new genus for "Aralia" lobata Knowlton (1924).	
Ficoxylon mogaungense	Sp. nov	Valid	Licht, Boura & De Franceschi in Licht et al.	Eocene	Pondaung Formation	Myanmar	A member of Moraceae, a species of Ficoxylon.	
Machaerium aiuruoquense	Sp. nov	Valid	Bernardes-de-Oliveira et al.	Eocene-Oligocene	Entre-Córregos Formation	Brazil	A species of Machaerium.	
Machaerium paleogenum	Sp. nov	Valid	Bernardes-de-Oliveira et al.	Eocene-Oligocene	Entre-Córregos Formation	Brazil	A species of Machaerium.	
Paliurus microcarpa	Sp. nov	Valid	Li in Li et al.	Middle or late Miocene	Shengxian Formation	China	A member of Rhamnaceae, a species of Paliurus.	
Paraalbizioxylon caccavariae	Sp. nov	Valid	Martínez	Late Miocene	Chiquimil Formation	Argentina	A member of Mimosoideae described on the basis of fossil wood.	
Quercus tenuipilosa	Sp. nov	Valid	Hu & Zhou in Hu et al.	Late Pliocene	Ciying Formation	China	An oak.	
Quercus yangyiensis	Sp. nov	Valid	He, Li & Sun in He et al.	Late Pliocene	Yangyi Formation	China	An oak.	
Ticodendron palaios	Sp. nov	Valid	Chambers & Poinar	Eocene or Miocene		Dominican Republic	A species of Ticodendron known from Dominican amber.	
Ulmoidicarpum	Gen. et sp. nov	Valid	Herrera & Manchester in Herrera et al.	Paleocene	Cerrejón Formation	Colombia	An ulmaceous fruit morphogenus. The type species includes U. tupperi.	

==== Malvids ====
Name	Novelty	Status	Authors	Age	Unit	Location	Notes	Images
Aerofructus	Gen. et sp. nov	Valid	Herrera & Manchester in Herrera et al.	Paleocene	Cerrejón Formation	Colombia	A member of Malvaceae described on the basis of fossil fruit. Genus includes new species A. dillhoffii.	
Bombacoxylon pondaungense	Sp. nov	Valid	Licht, Boura & De Franceschi in Licht et al.	Eocene	Pondaung Formation	Myanmar	A member of Malvaceae, a species of Bombacoxylon.	
Eucalyptoxylon	Gen. et 2 sp. nov	Valid	Shukla, Mehrotra & Guleria	Paleocene–Eocene	Marh Formation; Vagadkhol Formation	India	A myrtacean wood morphogenus. Genus includes E. vagadkholensis and E. eocenicus.	
Kleinhovia bikanerensis	Sp. nov	Valid	Shukla, Mehrotra & Guleria	Early Eocene	Marh Formation	India	A species of Kleinhovia.	
Sapindoxylon burmense	Sp. nov	Valid	Licht, Boura & De Franceschi in Licht et al.	Eocene	Pondaung Formation	Myanmar	A member of Sapindaceae, a species of Sapindoxylon.	
Shoreoxylon panganense	Sp. nov	Valid	Licht, Boura & De Franceschi in Licht et al.	Eocene	Pondaung Formation	Myanmar	A member of Dipterocarpaceae, a species of Shoreoxylon.	

=== Other angiosperms ===
Name	Novelty	Status	Authors	Age	Unit	Location	Notes	Images
Anemocardium	Gen. et sp. nov	Valid	Herrera & Manchester in Herrera et al.	Paleocene	Bogotá Formation	Colombia	A fossil fruit of uncertain affinity. Type species A. margaritae.	
Antarctoxylon mixai	Sp. nov	Valid	Sakala in Sakala & Vodrážka	Late Cretaceous (Coniacian)	Hidden Lake Formation	Antarctica (James Ross Island)	An angiosperm of uncertain phylogenetic placement, a species of Antarctoxylon.	
Chachlovia	Gen. et sp. et comb. nov	Valid	Alekseev & Herman in Alekseev, Herman & Shchepetov	Late Cretaceous		Russia	An angiosperm of uncertain phylogenetic placement. The type species is C. kiyensis; genus also contains C. dombeyopsoida	
Cissites reticulatus	Sp. nov	Valid	Moiseeva	Late Cretaceous (Santonian–Campanian)	Emuneret Formation	Russia	A flowering plant morphospecies of uncertain affinity described from fossil leaves.	
Dicotylophyllum hansonium	Sp. nov	Valid	Peppe & Hickey	Paleocene	Fort Union Formation	United States	An angiosperm of uncertain phylogenetic placement, a species of Dicotylophyllum.	
Dicotylophyllum horsecreekium	Sp. nov	Valid	Peppe & Hickey	Paleocene	Fort Union Formation	United States	An angiosperm of uncertain phylogenetic placement, a species of Dicotylophyllum.	
Dicotylophyllum stipulare	Sp. nov	Valid	Moiseeva	Late Cretaceous (Santonian–Campanian)	Emuneret Formation	Russia	A flowering plant described on the basis of fossil leaves.	
Hickeycarpum	Gen. et sp. nov	Valid	Herrera & Manchester in Herrera et al.	Paleocene	Bogotá Formation	Colombia	A fossil samara of uncertain affinity. Type species H. peltatum.	
Platimeliphyllum reznikoviorum	Sp. nov	Valid	Maslova in Maslova et al.	Paleogene	Ashut Formation	Kazakhstan	An angiosperm of uncertain phylogenetic placement, a species of Platimeliphyllum.	
Soninia	Gen. et 2 sp. nov	Valid	Herman & Shczepetov in Alekseev, Herman & Shchepetov	Late Cretaceous		Russia	An angiosperm of uncertain phylogenetic placement. The type species is S. integerrima Herman & Shczepetov; genus also contains S. asiatica Alekseev.	
Viburniphyllum emuneretum	Sp. nov	Valid	Moiseeva	Late Cretaceous (Santonian–Campanian)	Emuneret Formation	Russia	A flowering plant described on the basis of fossil leaves.	

== Other seed plants ==
Name	Novelty	Status	Authors	Age	Unit	Location	Notes	Images
Bicatia	Gen. et 3 sp. nov	Valid	Friis, Pedersen & Crane	Early Cretaceous (late Aptian to middle Albian)		Portugal; United States	A Welwitschia-like seed plant. The type species is Bicatia costata; genus also contains Bicatia juncalensis and Bicatia rugosa.	
Cosmosperma	Gen. et sp. nov	Valid	Wang et al.	Late Devonian (Famennian)	Wutong Formation	China	A member of Lagenospermopsida of uncertain phylogenetic placement. The type species is Cosmosperma polyloba.	
Cycas fushunensis	Sp. nov	Valid	Su, Quan & Liu	Eocene (Lutetian)	Jijuntun Formation	China	A cycad, a species of Cycas.	
Nilssoniopteris binggouensis	Sp. nov	Valid	Na et al.	Early Cretaceous	Binggou Formation	China	A member of Bennettitales, a species of Nilssoniopteris.	
Nilssoniopteris corrugata	Sp. nov	Valid	Ray, Rothwell & Stockey	Early Cretaceous (Valanginian)		Canada	A member of Bennettitales, a species of Nilssoniopteris.	
Peltaspermum morovii	Sp. nov	Valid	Naugolnykh	Permian (Kazanian)		Russia	A member of Peltaspermaceae.	
Permocallipteris	Gen. et comb. nov	Valid	Naugolnykh	Permian (Artinskian to Wordian)		China; Mongolia; Russia	A seed fern belonging to the family Peltaspermaceae. Genus includes "Callipteris" adzvensis Zalessky (1927), "Callipteris" retensoria Zalessky (1939), "Odontopteris" artipinnata Zalessky (1937), "Neuropteris" wangenheimii Fischer von Waldheim (1840), "Callipteris" zeilleri Zalessky ex Neuburg (1948), "Callipteris" acutifolia Radczenko (1955), "Callipteris" altaica Zalessky ex Neuburg (1948), "Callipteris" angustata Zalessky (1939), "Callipteris" bardensis Zalessky (1939), "Callipteris" bella Zalessky (1939), "Callipteris" bexellii Durante (1992), "Callipteris" confluens Neuburg (1957), "Callipteris" cuspidata Zalessky (1939), "Callipteris" elegans Fefilova (1973), "Callipteris" ivancevia Gorelova (1960), "Callipteris" karskiana Tschirkova & Zalessky (1939), "Callipteris" lobatus Gorelova & Drjagina (1988), "Callipteris" lobulata Fefilova (1973), "Callipteris" mongoliensis Neuburg (1957), "Callipteris" oranetzensis Zalessky (1934), "Callipteris" orientalis Zalessky (1929), "Callipteris" patula Zalessky (1939), "Callipteris" plumosa Zalessky (1939), "Callipteris" polyneura Zalessky (1937), "Callipteris" pubescens Zalessky (1939), "Callipteris" rarinervis Zalessky (1934), "Callipteris" sahnii Zalessky (1929), "Callipteris" tatianaeana Zalessky (1934), "Callipteris" uralensis Zalessky (1914) and "Callipteris" vuktylensis Zalessky (1934).	
Phoenicopsis (Culgoweria) ordosensis	Sp. nov	Valid	Li et al.	Middle Jurassic	Yan'an Formation	China	A member of Czekanowskiales, a species of Phoenicopsis.	
Phoenicopsis (Phoenicopsis) neimengensis	Sp. nov	Valid	Wang, Yang & Sun	Early Cretaceous	Huolinhe Formation	China	A member of Czekanowskiales, a species of Phoenicopsis.	
Rudixylon	Gen. et sp. nov	Valid	Bomfleur et al.	Middle or early Late Triassic	Fremouw Formation	Antarctica	A member of Petriellales (an order of seed plants of uncertain phylogenetic placement). The type species is Rudixylon serbetianum.	
Rugaspermum stipitatus	Sp. nov	Valid	Bhowmik, Parveen & Das	Middle Triassic		India	A possible member of Gnetales, a species of Rugaspermum.	
Weltrichia antonii	Sp. nov	Valid	Popa	Early Jurassic (Sinemurian)	Steierdorf Formation	Romania	A member of Bennettitales.	
Weltrichia johannae	Sp. nov	Valid	Popa	Early Jurassic (Sinemurian)	Steierdorf Formation	Romania	A member of Bennettitales.	
Weltrichia steierdorfensis	Sp. nov	Valid	Popa	Early Jurassic (Hettangian-Sinemurian)	Steierdorf Formation	Romania	A member of Bennettitales.	
Xinjiangoxylon	Gen. et sp. nov	Valid	Shi et al.	Late Permian (Changhsingian)	Guodikeng Formation	China	A gymnosperm. The type species is Xinjiangoxylon turpanense.	

== Other plants ==
Name	Novelty	Status	Authors	Age	Unit	Location	Notes	Images
Baikalophyton	Gen. et sp. nov	Valid	Naugolnykh & Minina	Devonian		Russia	A terrestrial plant similar to Sciadophyton. The type species is Baikalophyton ruzhentsevii.	
Calymperites burmensis	Sp. nov	Valid	Heinrichs et al.	Cretaceous (Albian or Cenomanian)	Burmese amber	Myanmar	A moss belonging to the group Dicranales (sensu lato).	
Ceratolejeunea antiqua	Sp. nov	Valid	Heinrichs & Schäfer-Verwimp in Heinrichs et al.	Early to middle Miocene	Mexican amber	Mexico	A liverwort belonging to the family Lejeuneaceae, a species of Ceratolejeunea.	
Changxingia	Gen. et sp. nov	Valid	Wang et al.	Late Devonian	Wutong Formation	China	A lycopsid. The type species is Changxingia longifolia.	
Gackstroemia cretacea	Sp. nov	Valid	Heinrichs et al.	Early Cretaceous (late Albian)		Myanmar	A liverwort belonging to the group Jungermanniopsida and the family Lepidolaenaceae, a species of Gackstroemia.	
Lepidodendron bellii	Sp. nov	Valid	Álvarez-Vázquez & Wagner	Carboniferous (middle Pennsylvanian, i.e. early Westphalian)		Canada	A species of Lepidodendron.	
Lycopodites baikalensis	Sp. nov	Valid	Frolov in Frolov & Mashchuk	Middle Jurassic	Prisayan Formation	Russia	A member of Lycopodiales, a species of Lycopodites.	
Lycopodites subulifolius	Sp. nov	Valid	Frolov & Mashchuk	Middle Jurassic	Prisayan Formation	Russia	A member of Lycopodiales, a species of Lycopodites.	
Marchantites huolinhensis	Sp. nov	Valid	Li et al.	Early Cretaceous	Huolinhe Formation	China	A liverwort belonging to the group Marchantiales, a species of Marchantites.	
Ningchengia	Gen. et sp. nov	Valid	Heinrichs et al.	Jurassic	Jiulongshan Formation	China	A moss. Genus includes new species N. jurassica.	
Pantiathallites	Gen. et sp. nov	Valid	Banerjee & Dutta	Early Permian		India	A metzgeriinean bryophyte. The type species is Pantiathallites gondwanensis.	
Planatophyton	Gen. et sp. nov	Valid	Gerrienne et al.	Early or Middle Devonian	Hujiersite Formation	China	An euphyllophyte. The type species is Planatophyton hujiersitense.	
Rhizomnium dentatum	Sp nov	valid	Heinrichs et al., 2014	Middle Eocene	Baltic amber	Europe	A Mniaceae moss	
Ufadendron	Gen. et sp. nov	Valid	Naugolnykh	Permian (Kungurian)	Koshelevsk Formation	Russia	A lycopsid. The type species is Ufadendron ufaensis.	
Vetiplanaxis espinosus	Sp. nov	Valid	Hedenäs, Heinrichs & Schmidt	Cretaceous (Albian or Cenomanian)	Burmese amber	Myanmar	A moss belonging to the class Bryopsida and the order Hypnodendrales.	
Vetiplanaxis longiacuminatus	Sp. nov	Valid	Hedenäs, Heinrichs & Schmidt	Cretaceous (Albian or Cenomanian)	Burmese amber	Myanmar	A moss belonging to the class Bryopsida and the order Hypnodendrales.	
Vetiplanaxis oblongus	Sp. nov	Valid	Hedenäs, Heinrichs & Schmidt	Cretaceous (Albian or Cenomanian)	Burmese amber	Myanmar	A moss belonging to the class Bryopsida and the order Hypnodendrales.	
