= Palaeocymopolia =

Palaeocymopolia Temporal range: Ludfordian

Scientific classification
- Kingdom: Plantae
- Division: Chlorophyta
- Class: Ulvophyceae
- Order: Dasycladales
- Family: †Triploporellaceae
- Genus: †Palaeocymopolia; LoDuca, Melchin & Verbruggen
- Species: †P. nunavutensis

Binomial name
- †Palaeocymopolia nunavutensis LoDuca, Melchin & Verbruggen

Extinct genus of algae

Palaeocymopolia is an extinct genus of seaweed in the order Dasycladales, which existed in what is now Cornwallis Island, Nunavut, Northern Canada, during the Ludfordian age (Silurian period). It was described from the Cape Phillips Formation by Steven T. LoDuca, Michael J. Melchin and Heroen Verbruggen in 2011, and the type species is P. nunavutensis.

== Etymology ==
Steven T. LoDuca, Michael J. Melchin and Heroen Verbruggen first described the type species Palaeocymopolia nunavutensis in 2011. The generic name combines "paleo" (Ancient Greek: "old") and "Cymopolia" (an extant genus of algae in the order Dasycladales), and referring both to the age of the material, and to its similarities to Cymopolia (the authors specified the species C. barbata). The species epithet refers to Nunavut, the Canadian territory from which the species was described.

== Description ==
The holotype specimen (ROM 59918) of Palaeocymopolia nunavutensis, also the largest specimen, was 72 millimetres in length and bent towards the base.
