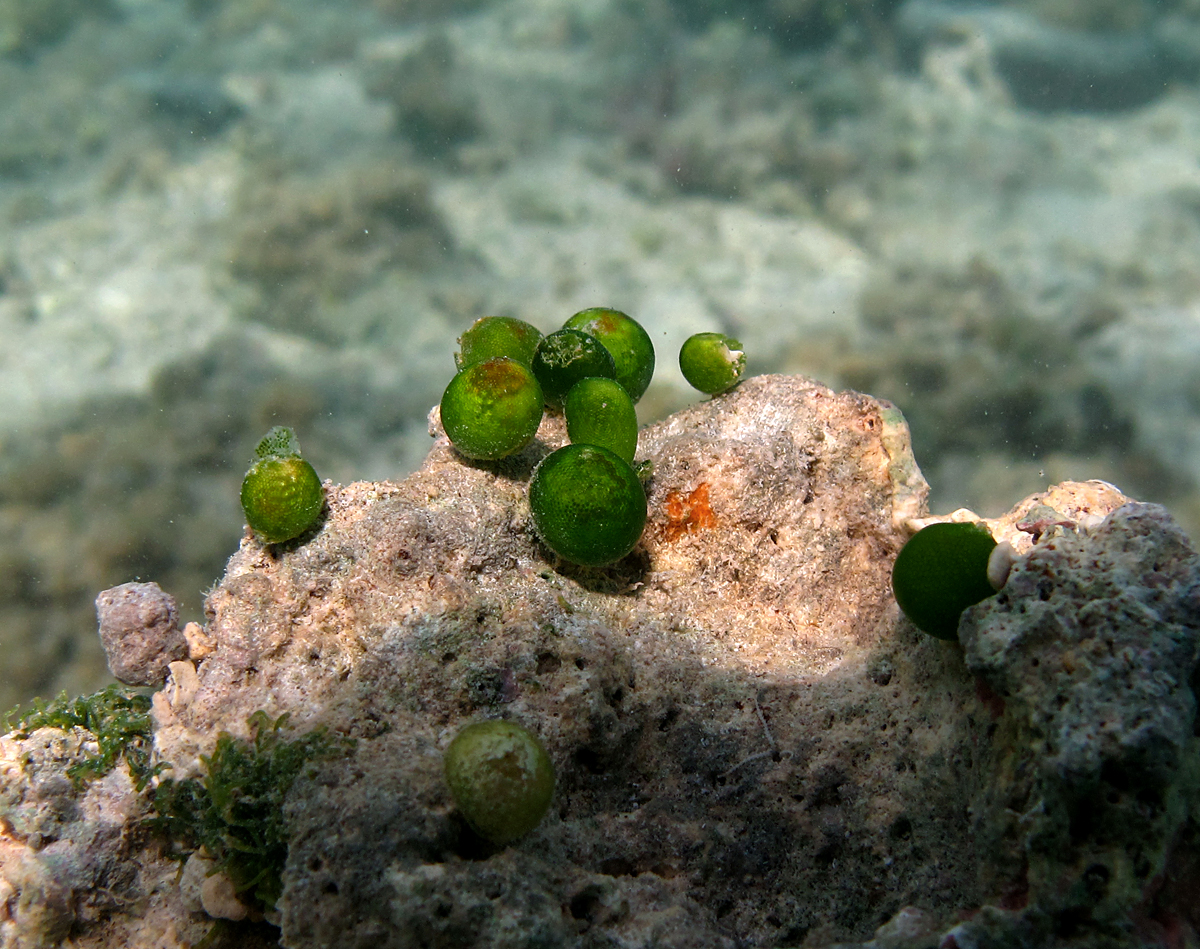
- In Réunion

Scientific classification
- Kingdom: Plantae
- Division: Chlorophyta
- Class: Ulvophyceae
- Order: Dasycladales
- Family: Dasycladaceae
- Genus: Bornetella
- Species: B. sphaerica

Binomial name
- Bornetella sphaerica (Zanardini) Solms-Laubach 1892

= Bornetella sphaerica =

Species of alga

Bornetella sphaerica, commonly known as the spherical turtle shell, is a species of marine alga in the Dasycladaceae family. It is found in the tropical Indo-Pacific region, the type-location being Sorong, Irian Jaya, Indonesia.

== Description ==
The thallus of Bornetella sphaerica is attached to the substrate by a disc-shaped holdfast. The slender cylindrical stipe is continuous with the central vein that extends halfway along the thallus. The vein bears whorls of fine lateral filaments and terminates in a whorl of threadlike branches with neatly-arranged inflated hexagonal ends. The whole thallus is rolled into a spherical mass with a diameter of about 5 to 10 mm (0.2 to 0.4 in).

== Distribution and habitat ==
Bornetella sphaerica is found in the Indo-Pacific region, its range extending from East Africa and Madagascar to Japan, the Philippines, Hawaii and northern Australia. It grows on reefs, on rocks and dead coral heads, at depths from the low intertidal zone down to about 65 m (200 ft).
