= 1928 in paleontology =

Paleontology or palaeontology is the study of prehistoric life forms on Earth through the examination of plant and animal fossils. This includes the study of body fossils, tracks (ichnites), burrows, cast-off parts, fossilised feces (coprolites), palynomorphs and chemical residues. Because humans have encountered fossils for millennia, paleontology has a long history both before and after becoming formalized as a science. This article records significant discoveries and events related to paleontology that occurred or were published in the year 1928.

== Plants ==
=== Angiosperms ===
==== Superrosids - Fabids ====
Name	Novelty	Status	Authors	Age	Unit	Location	Synonymized taxa	Notes	Images
Paliurus hesperius	Sp nov	valid?	Berry	Miocene; Langhian	Latah Formation; Grand Coulee florule	USA; Washington		A Paliurus species Synonymized into Paliurus favonii (2008); But contested in 2014	

== Archosauromorphs ==
=== Dinosaurs ===
Taxon	Novelty	Status	Author(s)	Age	Unit	Location	Notes	Images
Edmontonia longiceps	Gen. et sp. nov.	Valid	Sternberg	Maastrichtian	Horseshoe Canyon Formation	Alberta	A nodosaurid	
Polacanthoides ponderosus	Gen. et sp. nov.	Nomen dubium	Nopcsa	Early Cretaceous		England	A chimera of Hylaeosaurus and Polacanthus.	
Scolosaurus cutleri	Gen. et sp. nov.	Valid	Nopcsa	Campanian	Dinosaur Park Formation	Alberta	An ankylosaurid	
Teinurosaurus	Gen. nov.	Nomen dubium	Nopcsa	Tithonian	Mont-Lambert Formation	France	Lacking a type species until material named Caudocoelus sauvagei	

=== Pterosaurs ===
Name	Novelty	Status	Authors	Age	Unit	Location	Synonymized taxa	Notes	Images
Campylognathoides	Gen nov	Valid	Strand	Jurassic; Toarcian	Sachrang Formation; Posidonia Shale	Germany; Baden-Württemberg		A campylognathoidid pterosaur	Campylognathoides

=== Field work ===
Charles Gilmore returned to prospect for fossils in the Two Medicine Formation. He would return yet again in 1935.

== Synapsids ==
=== Therapsids ===
Name	Novelty	Status	Authors	Age	Unit	Location	Synonymized taxa	Notes	Images
Chalepotherium	Gen nov		Simpson						
Gomphodontosuchus	Gen et sp nov		Huene	Triassic; Carnian		Brazil		A Plant-Eating Cynodont. The type species is G. brasiliensis	
Taurocephalus	Gen et sp nov		Broom			South Africa			
