= Diplopora oregonensis =

Diplopora oregonensis Temporal range: Late Triassic

Scientific classification
- Kingdom: Plantae
- Division: Chlorophyta
- Class: Ulvophyceae
- Order: Dasycladales
- Family: †Diploporaceae
- Genus: †Diplopora
- Species: †D. oregonensis

Binomial name
- †Diplopora oregonensis E. Flügel et al.

Extinct species of alga

Diplopora oregonensis is a species of algae in the genus Diplopora in the family Diploporaceae. It is a unique species of marine dasycladacean algae from the Triassic period. It was discovered by George Stanley of the University of Montana, with findings published in the 1980s. It was obtained from sands and shales of the Wallowa volcanic archipelago, more specifically the Hurwal Formation in eastern Oregon. The strata of this formation developed from geologic processing of limestone deposits. The deposits were produced along the floors of lagoons of an ancient shallow ocean.
