= Bornetella nitida =

Scientific classification
- Clade: Viridiplantae
- Division: Chlorophyta
- Class: Ulvophyceae
- Order: Dasycladales
- Family: Dasycladaceae
- Genus: Bornetella
- Species: B. nitida

Binomial name
- Bornetella nitida Sonder, 1880

Species of alga

Bornetella nitida is a species of marine algae in the Dasycladaceae family. It is found throughout the Pacific Ocean, including Mauritius, Indonesia, Australia, and Japan.
