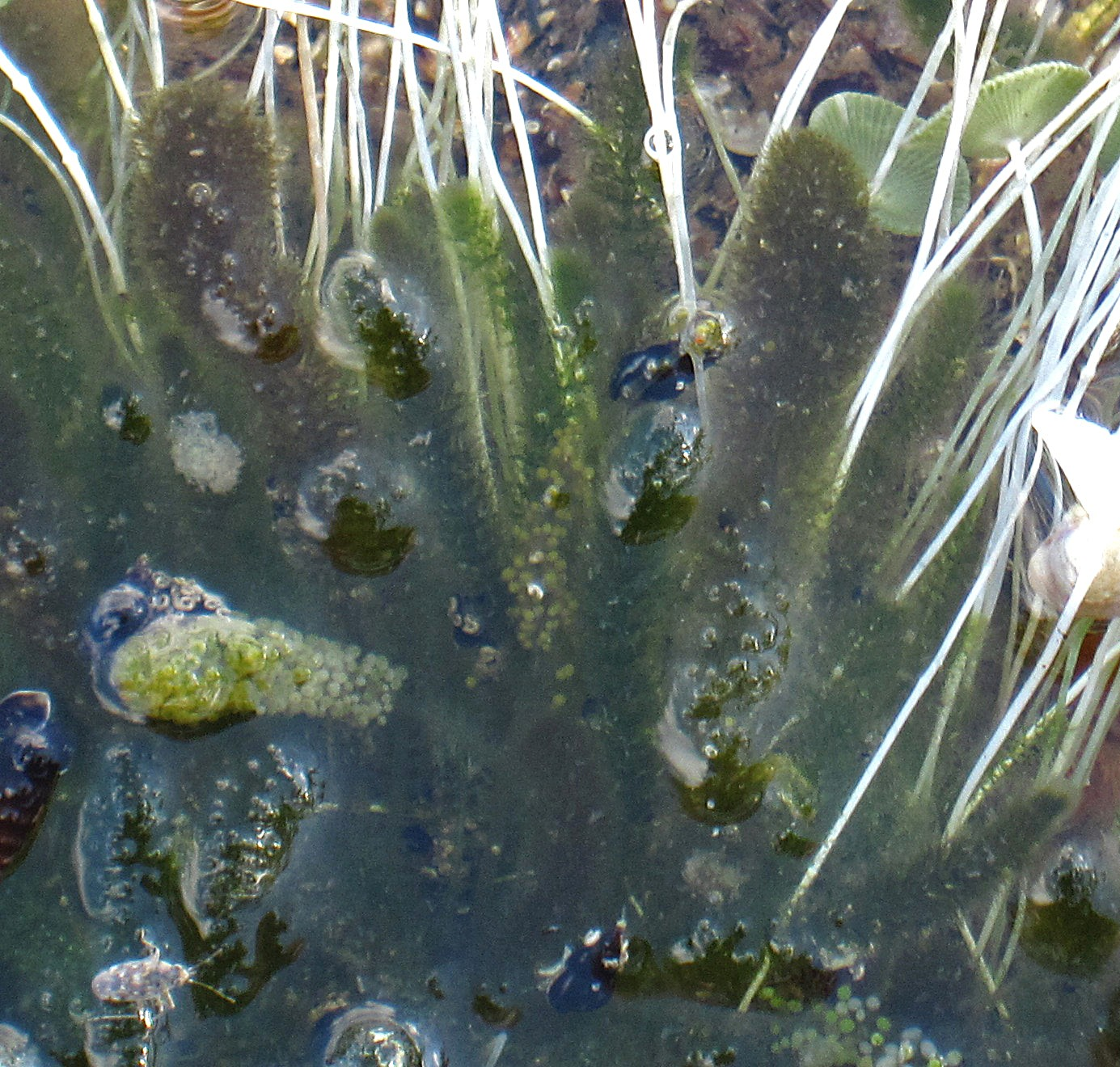
- Batophora oerstedii

Scientific classification
- Kingdom: Plantae
- Division: Chlorophyta
- Class: Ulvophyceae
- Order: Dasycladales
- Family: Dasycladaceae
- Genus: Batophora
- Species: B. oerstedii

Binomial name
- Batophora oerstedii Agardh, 1854

Synonyms
- Dasycladus conquerantii P.L.Crouan & H.M.Crouan 1865; Dasycladus conquerantii P.L.Crouan & H.M.Crouan 1866; Coccocladus occidentalis var. conquerantii (P.L.Crouan & H.M.Crouan) M.A.Howe 1904

= Batophora oerstedii =

Species of alga

Batophora oerstedii is a species of algae in the family Dasycladaceae. It is the type species (holotype) of the genus Batophora.
