= Chaetocladus capitatus =

Chaetocladus capitatus Temporal range: Ludfordian ~426–423 Ma

Scientific classification
- Clade: Viridiplantae
- Division: Chlorophyta
- Class: Ulvophyceae
- Order: Dasycladales
- Family: †Triploporellaceae
- Genus: †Chaetocladus
- Species: †C. capitatus

Binomial name
- †Chaetocladus capitatus Loduca, Melchin & Verbruggen

Synonyms
- Chaetocladus captitatus [misspelling]

Extinct species of alga

Chaetocladus capitatus is an extinct species of green algae in the genus Chaetocladus, which existed in what is now Cornwallis Island, Arctic Canada, during the Ludfordian age (Silurian period). It was described by Steven T. Loduca, Michael J. Melchin and Heroen Verbruggen in 2011 based on fossils found in the Cape Phillips Formation.
