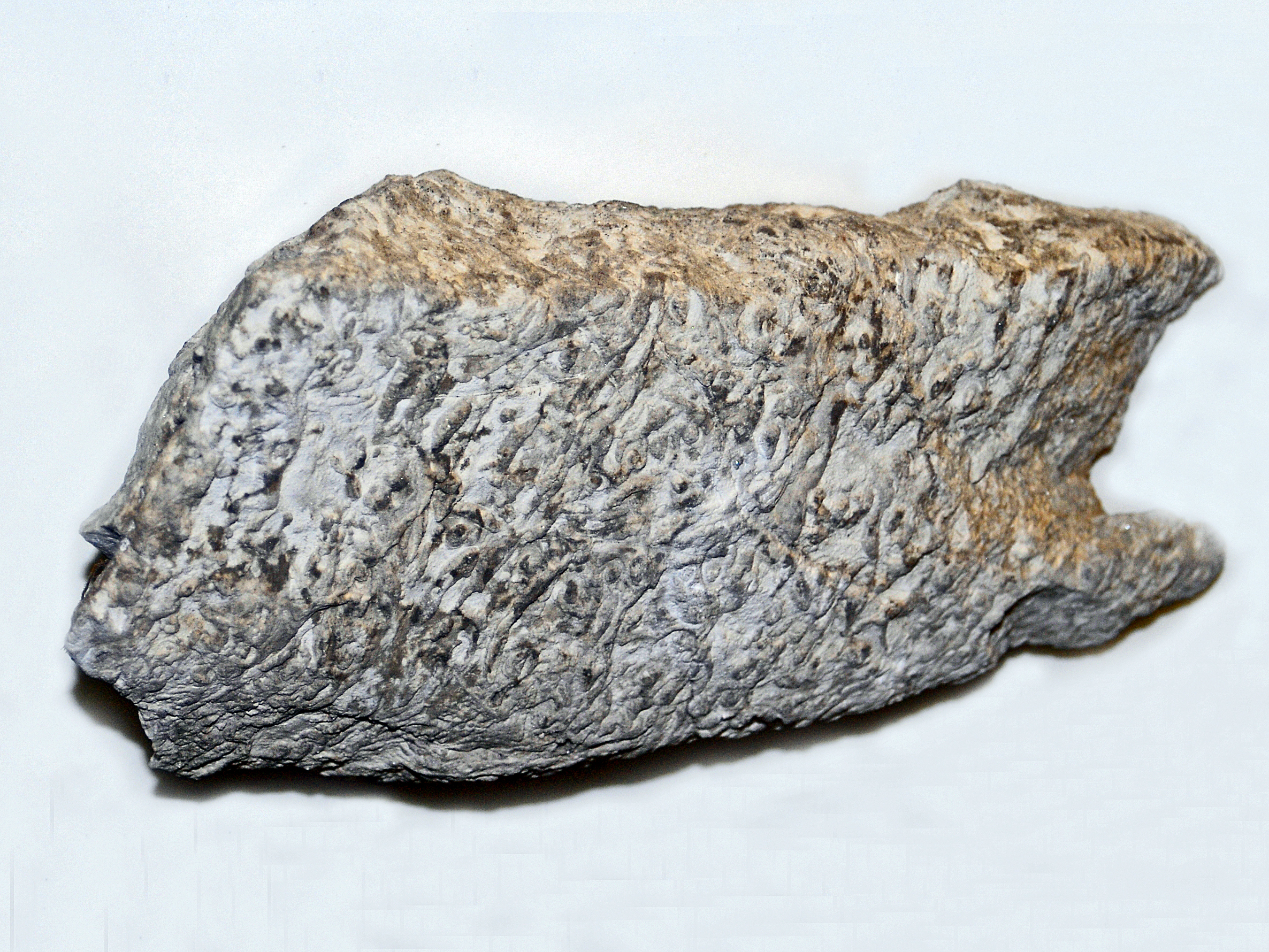
- Fossil Gyroporella from Triassic of Italy

Scientific classification
- Clade: Viridiplantae
- Division: Chlorophyta
- Class: Ulvophyceae
- Order: Dasycladales
- Family: Dasycladaceae (?)
- Genus: Gyroporella; Gümbel 1872

= Gyroporella =

Gyroporella Temporal range: Permian – Triassic 272.5–205.6 Ma

Extinct genus of algae

Gyroporella is an extinct genus of green algae, placed either in the family Dasycladaceae or the family Triploporellaceae.

== Fossil record ==
This genus is known in the fossil record from the Permian to the Triassic (from about 272.5 to 205.6 million years ago). Fossils of species within this genus have been found in Europe, Iran, Afghanistan, China, Malaysia and Tunisia.
