= Amicus (alga) =

Scientific classification
- Kingdom: Plantae
- Division: Chlorophyta
- Class: Ulvophyceae
- Order: Dasycladales
- Family: Dasycladaceae
- Genus: Amicus; Maslov, 1956

Genus of algae

Amicus is a genus of green algae belonging to the family Dasycladaceae.

Species:

- Amicus fortunatus Maslov
- Amicus klekensis Pantić
- Amicus konishii Nakamura
- Amicus orientalis R.Endo
