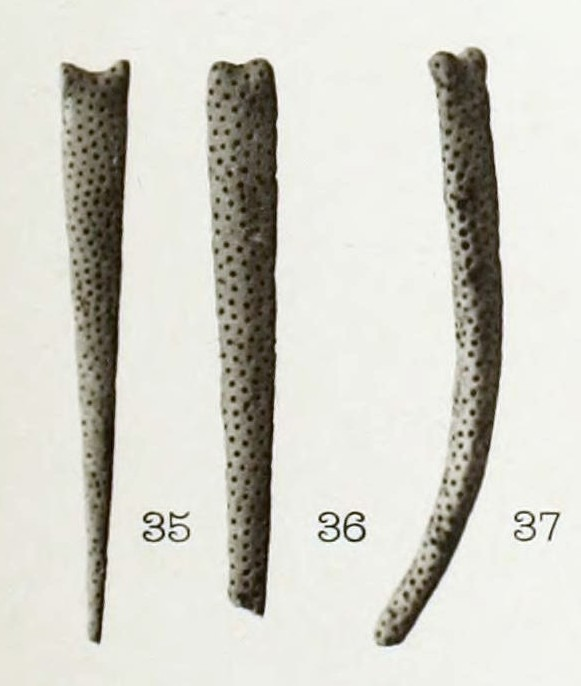

Scientific classification
- Clade: Viridiplantae
- Division: Chlorophyta
- Class: Ulvophyceae
- Order: Dasycladales
- Family: Dasycladaceae
- Genus: †Acicularia d'Archiac, 1843

Species
- Acicularia cornigera L.Morellet & J.Morellet; Acicularia pavantina d'Archiac

= Acicularia =

Extinct genus of algae

Acicularia is an extinct genus of green algae in the family Dasycladaceae.
