= S.M. Bell =

S.M. Bell may refer to:

- Shona M. Bell (1924–2011), American botanist, standard abbreviation S.M. Bell
- S.M. Bell (politician), running mate of William Goodell (abolitionist) in 1852 US Presidential election
