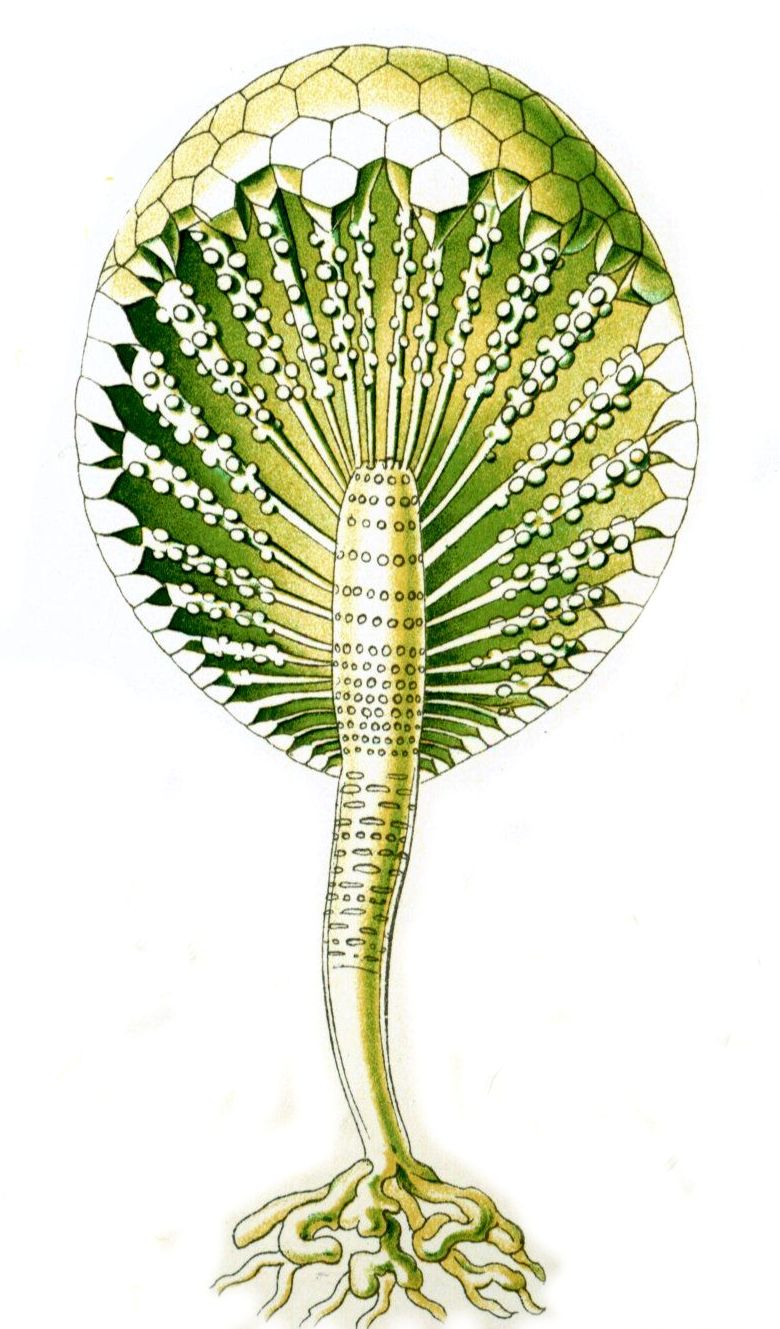
- Bornetella capitata by Ernst Haeckel

Scientific classification
- Kingdom: Plantae
- Division: Chlorophyta
- Class: Ulvophyceae
- Order: Dasycladales
- Family: Dasycladaceae
- Genus: Bornetella; Munier-Chalmas

= Bornetella =

Genus of algae

Bornetella is a genus of green algae in the family Dasycladaceae.

The genus name of Bornetella is in honour of Jean-Baptiste Édouard Bornet (1828–1911), a French botanist and the genus was published in Compt. Rend. Hebd. Seances Acad. Sci. Vol.85 on page 815 in 1877.

== Species ==
The World Register of Marine Species includes the following species in the genus:-

- Bornetella capitata (Harvey ex E.P.Wright) J.Agardh, 1887
- Bornetella clavellina Tanaka, 1956
- Bornetella nitida Munier-Chalmas ex Sonder, 1880
- Bornetella oligospora Solms-Laubach, 1892
- Bornetella sphaerica (Zanardini) Solms-Laubach, 1892
- Bornetella vitileviana H.Kasahara, 1998
