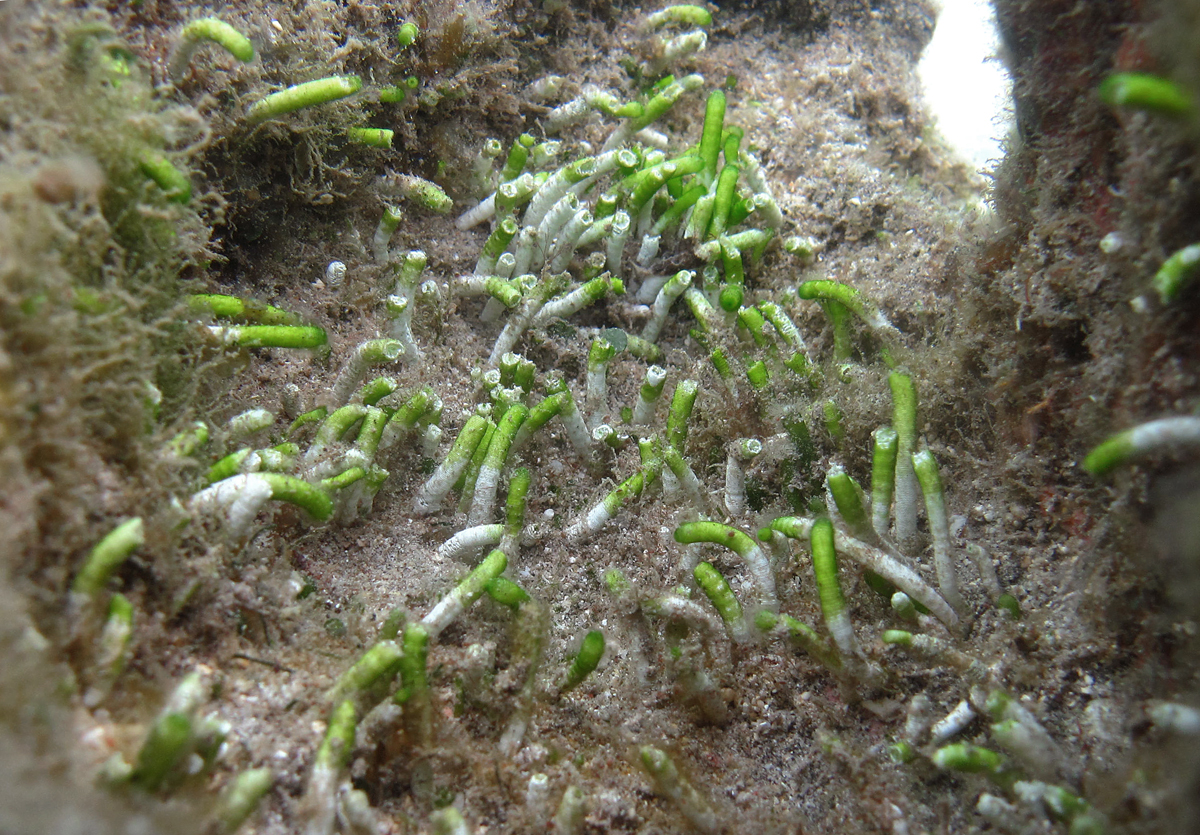
- Neomeris vanbosseae

Scientific classification
- Kingdom: Plantae
- Division: Chlorophyta
- Class: Ulvophyceae
- Order: Dasycladales
- Family: Dasycladaceae
- Genus: Neomeris; J.V.Lamouroux

Species
- Neomeris dumetosa

= Neomeris =

Genus of algae

Neomeris is a genus of green algae in the family Dasycladaceae. It grows attached to surfaces in tropical and subtropical oceans worldwide.

Neomeris consists of club- or worm-shaped thalli. The thallus consists of a single cell that grows up to 2.5 cm tall, with ring-like segmented bands of calcification.
