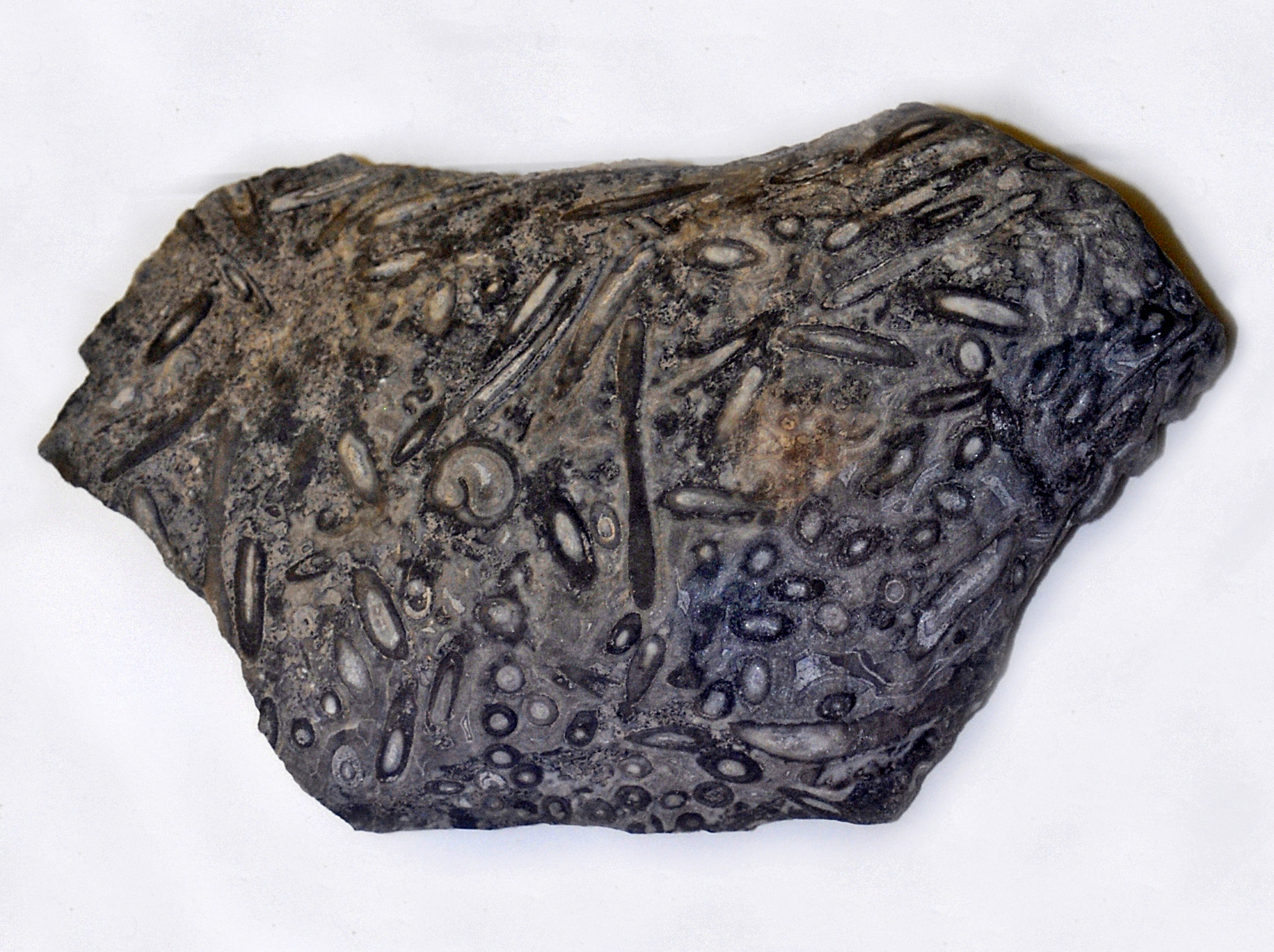
- Fossil of Diplopora annulata from Triassic of Italy

Scientific classification
- Kingdom: Plantae
- Division: Chlorophyta
- Class: Ulvophyceae
- Order: Dasycladales
- Family: †Diploporaceae
- Genus: †Diplopora; K.E. Schafhäutl, 1863

= Diplopora =

Diplopora Temporal range: Silurian – Jurassic 426.2–155.7 Ma

Extinct genus of algae

Diplopora is an extinct genus of marine dasycladacean algae in the family Diploporaceae.

== Fossil records ==
This genus is known in the fossil records from the Silurian to the Jurassic (from about 426.2 to 155.7 million years ago). Fossils of species within this genus have been found in Europe, Iran, Japan, Mexico, Russia, Iraq, and the United States.

== Species ==
Species within this genus include:

- †Diplopora oregonensis E. Flügel et al.
- †Diplopora permica Korde 1965
- †Diplopora annulata Schafhäutl
