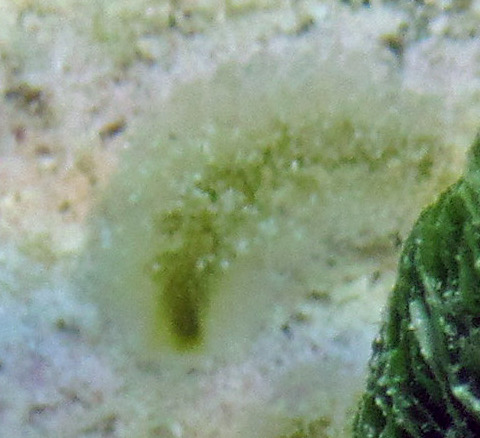
- Batophora sp. off San Salvador Island

Scientific classification
- Kingdom: Plantae
- Division: Chlorophyta
- Class: Ulvophyceae
- Order: Dasycladales
- Family: Dasycladaceae
- Genus: Batophora; J.Agardh, 1854

Type species
- Batophora oerstedii J.Agardh, 1854

Species
- Batophora oerstedii J.Agardh, 1854; Batophora occidentalis (Harvey) S.Berger & Kaever ex M.J.Wynne

= Batophora =

Genus of algae

Batophora is a genus of green algae in the family Dasycladaceae.
