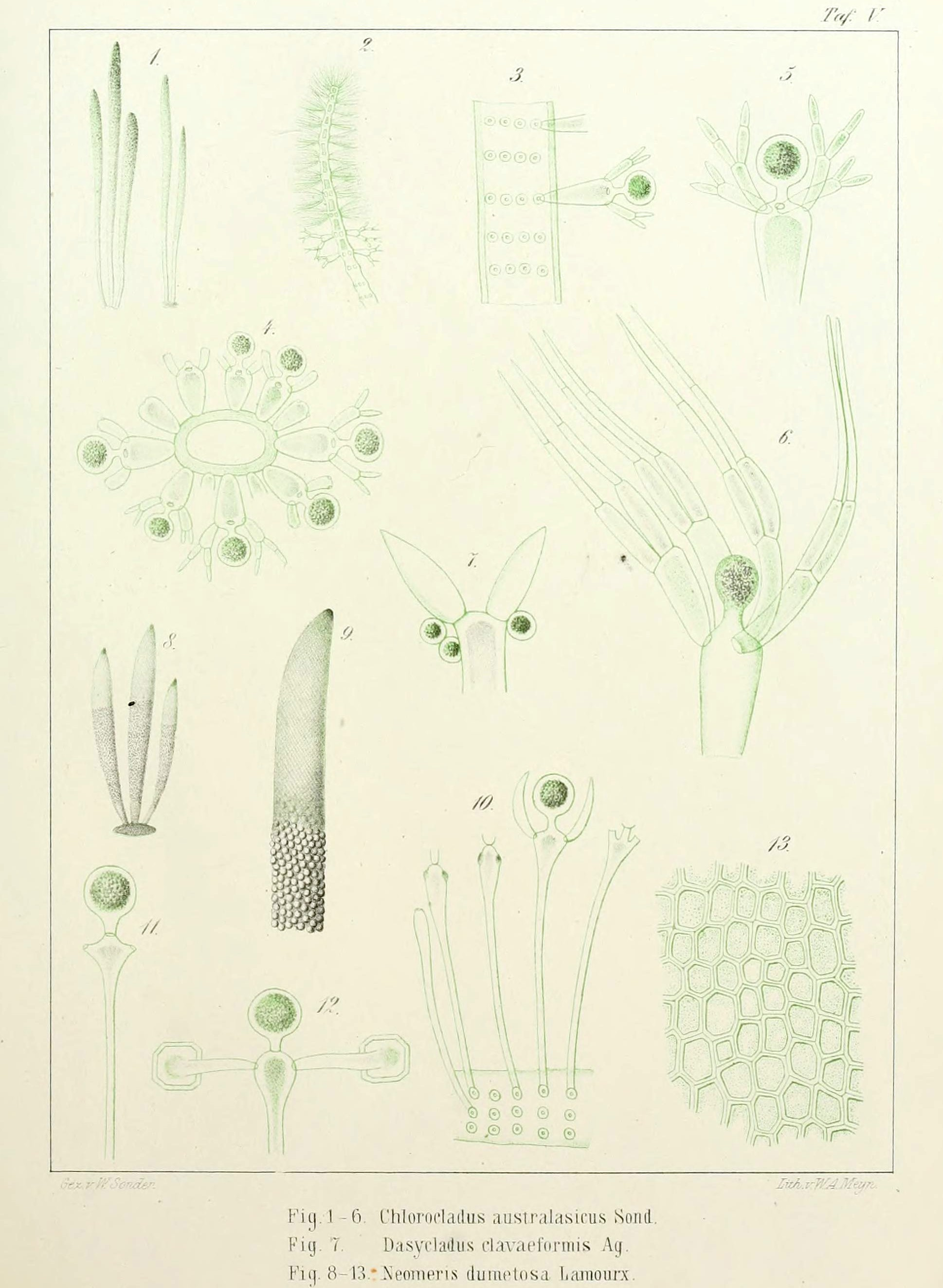
- Chlorocladus

Scientific classification
- Kingdom: Plantae
- Division: Chlorophyta
- Class: Ulvophyceae
- Order: Dasycladales
- Family: Dasycladaceae
- Genus: Chloroclados; Sonder
- Species: C. australasicus

Binomial name
- Chloroclados australasicus Sonder

= Chloroclados =

Genus of algae

Chloroclados is a genus of green algae in the family Dasycladaceae, containing the single accepted species Chloroclados australasicus.
