= Eocladus =

Eocladus Temporal range: Ludfordian

Scientific classification
- Clade: Viridiplantae
- Division: Chlorophyta
- Class: Ulvophyceae
- Order: Dasycladales
- Family: †Triploporellaceae
- Genus: †Eocladus; LoDuca, Melchin & Verbruggen
- Species: †E. xiaoi

Binomial name
- †Eocladus xiaoi LoDuca, Melchin & Verbruggen

Extinct genus of algae

Eocladus xiaoi is an extinct species of seaweed which existed in what is now Cornwallis Island, Northern Canada, during the Ludfordian age (Silurian period). It was described by Steven T. LoDuca, Michael J. Melchin and Heroen Verbruggen in 2011 based on fossils found in the Cape Phillips Formation.
