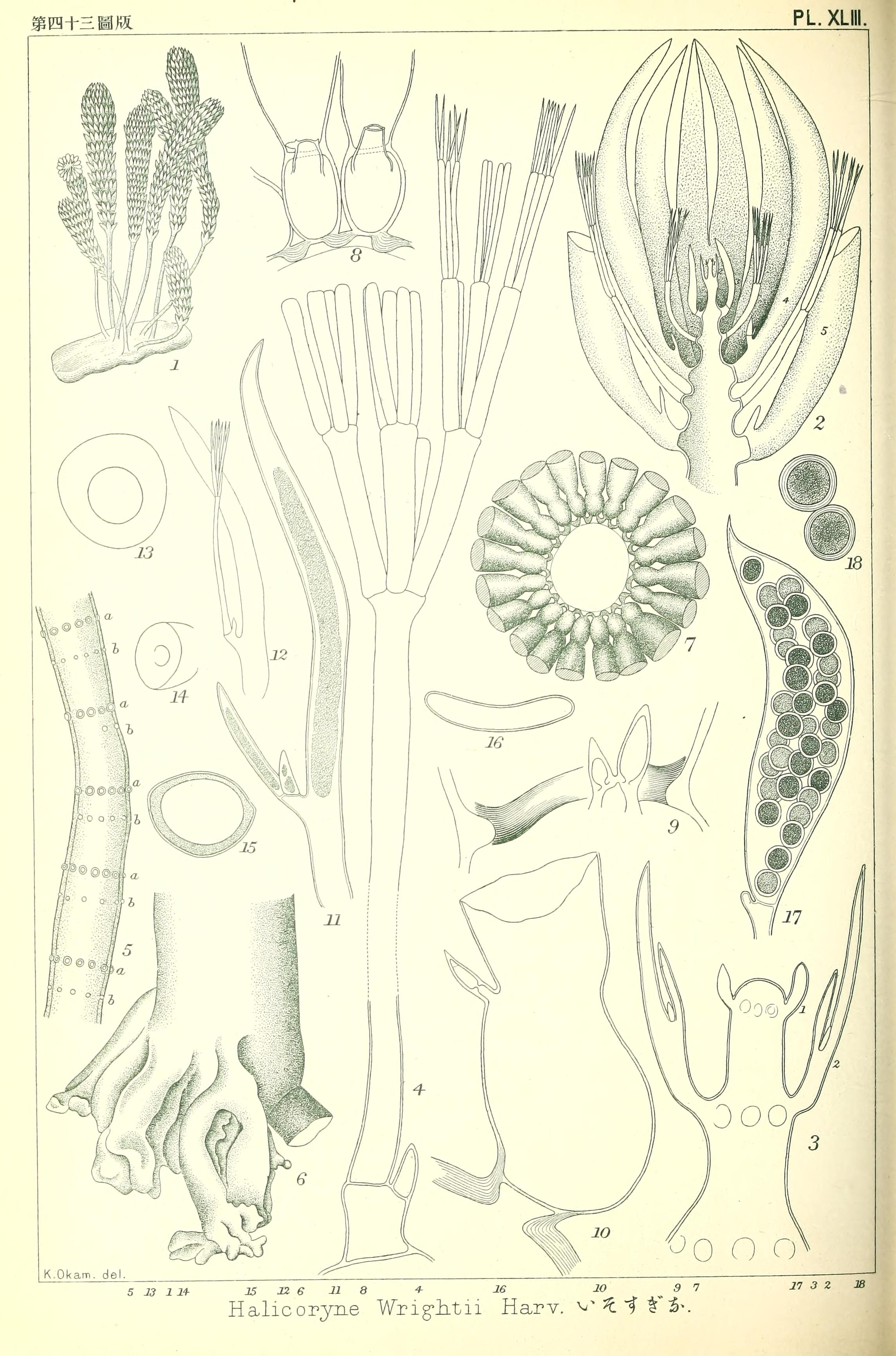
- Halicoryne wrightii

Scientific classification
- Clade: Viridiplantae
- Division: Chlorophyta
- Class: Ulvophyceae
- Order: Dasycladales
- Family: Dasycladaceae
- Genus: Halicoryne; Harvey

Species
- Halicoryne wrightii

= Halicoryne =

Genus of algae

Halicoryne is a genus of green algae in the family Dasycladaceae.
