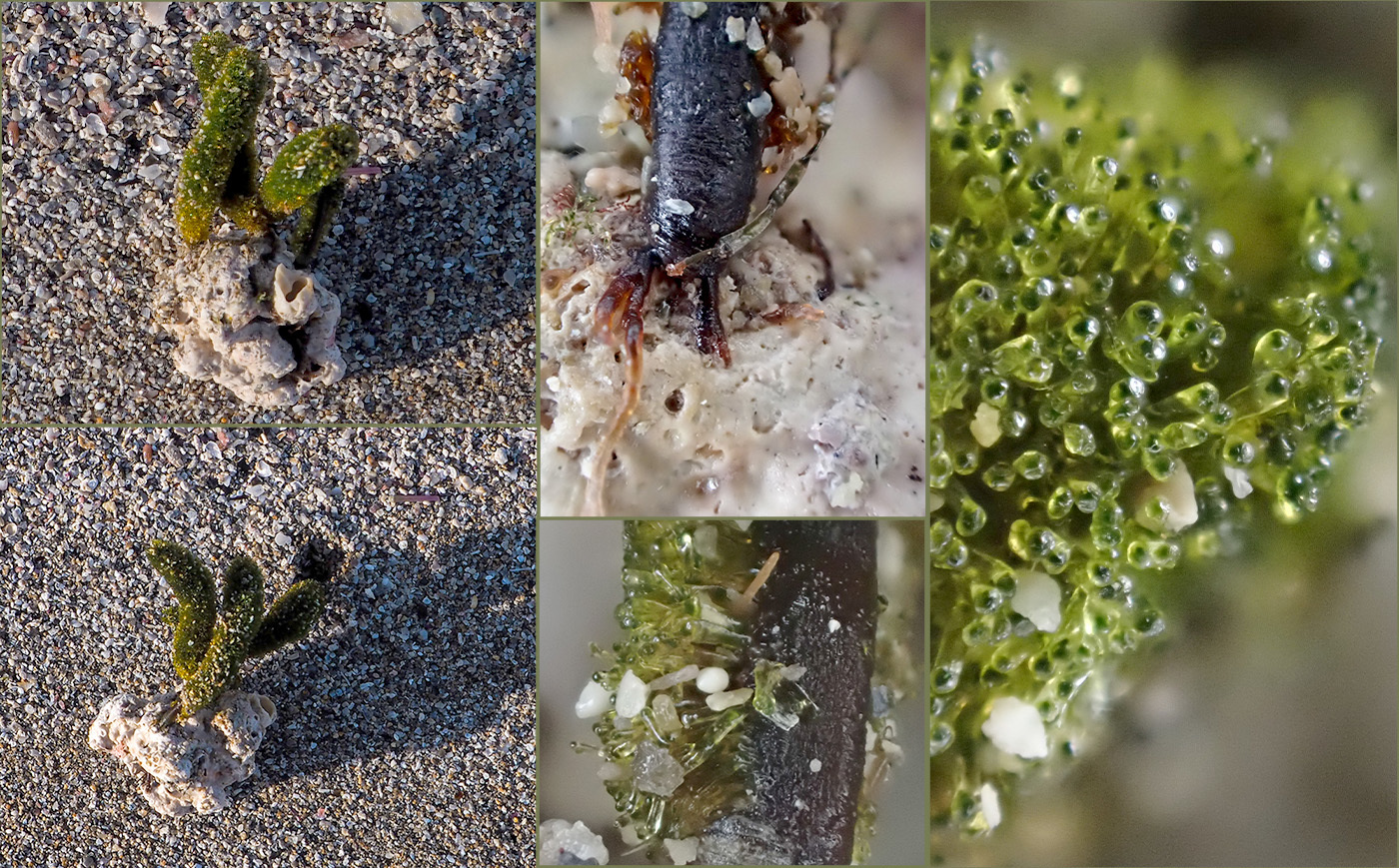
- Dasycladus vermicularis

Scientific classification
- Clade: Viridiplantae
- Division: Chlorophyta
- Class: Ulvophyceae
- Order: Dasycladales
- Family: Dasycladaceae
- Genus: Dasycladus; C.Agardh

Species
- Dasycladus vermicularis

= Dasycladus =

Genus of algae

Dasycladus is a genus of green algae in the family Dasycladaceae. Dasycladus is a marine species.
