= Chaetocladus =

Chaetocladus Temporal range: Middle Ordovician - Devonian
- The holotype of Chaetocladus plumula (USNM 41 137, from LoDuca 1997)

Scientific classification
- Domain: Eukaryota
- Clade: Archaeplastida
- Clade: Viridiplantae
- Division: Chlorophyta
- Class: Ulvophyceae
- Order: Dasycladales
- Family: †Triploporellaceae
- Genus: †Chaetocladus; Whitfield 1894 emend. LoDuca 1997

Species
- See text.

Extinct genus of algae

Chaetocladus is an extinct non-calcifying genus of unicellular green algae known from the Upper Silurian.

== Morphology ==
Chaetocladus thalli range from 2–6 cm in height and average 1 cm in diameter. They comprise a parallel-sided, unbranching axis which is surrounded by leaf-like ramifications.

== Fossil record ==
Chaetocladus is known from upper Silurian konservat lagerstätte, and found in association with other algae, arthropods, and annelid worms. Similar Dasycladean algae are reported from late-Ordovician lagerstatte.

== Classification ==
Due to its morphological similarity to the extant order Dasycladales, Chaetocladus is considered to be an early cousin of this order. Unlike the majority of Dasycladales, Chaetocladus does not form deposit calcite - therefore it required much rarer taphonomic conditions to be preserved. Some genera now recognised as Chaetocladus were originally described as Graptolites.

== Species ==
- C. capitatus Loduca, Melchin & Verbruggen 2011
- C. dubius LoDuca 1997
- C. gracilis Kenrick & Vither 2006
- C. hefteri Krausel and Weyland, 1962
- C. plumula Whitfield 1894
- C. ruedemanni LoDuca 1997
