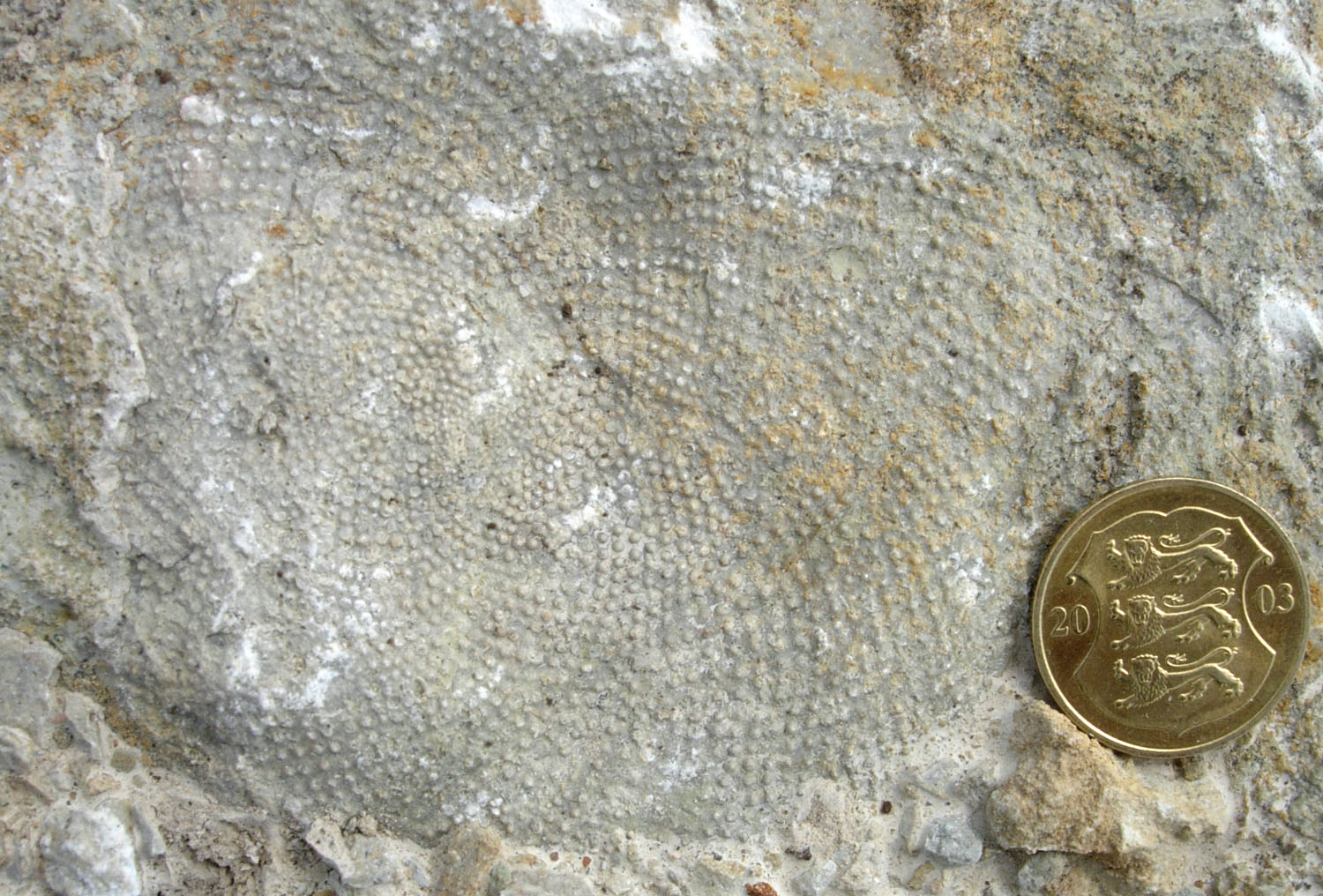
- Receptaculitid from the Ordovician of Estonia.

Scientific classification
- Kingdom: Plantae
- Division: Chlorophyta
- Class: Ulvophyceae
- Order: Dasycladales (?)
- Family: †Receptaculitaceae
- Genus: †Receptaculites; Defrance 1827

Species
- R. arcticus Etheridge; R. biconstrictus E.O.Ulrich; R. maeandriformis A.N.Ivanov; R. monticulatus; R. neptuni Defrance; R. occidentalis

= Receptaculites =

Receptaculites Temporal range: 488–250 Ma

Extinct genus of algae

Receptaculites is the name-bearing genus for an extinct group of conspicuous benthic marine genera, the receptaculitids (formally Receptaculitaceae or Receptaculitidae), that lived from the Early Ordovician through the Permian period, peaking in the Middle Ordovician. The group's phylogenetic origin has long been obscure, with some arguing that they were calcareous algae, probably of the order Dasycladales. Receptaculitids lived in warm, shallow seas, but consensus disagreeing. They have been described from all continents except Antarctica. In some areas they were important reef-formers, and they also occur as isolated specimens.

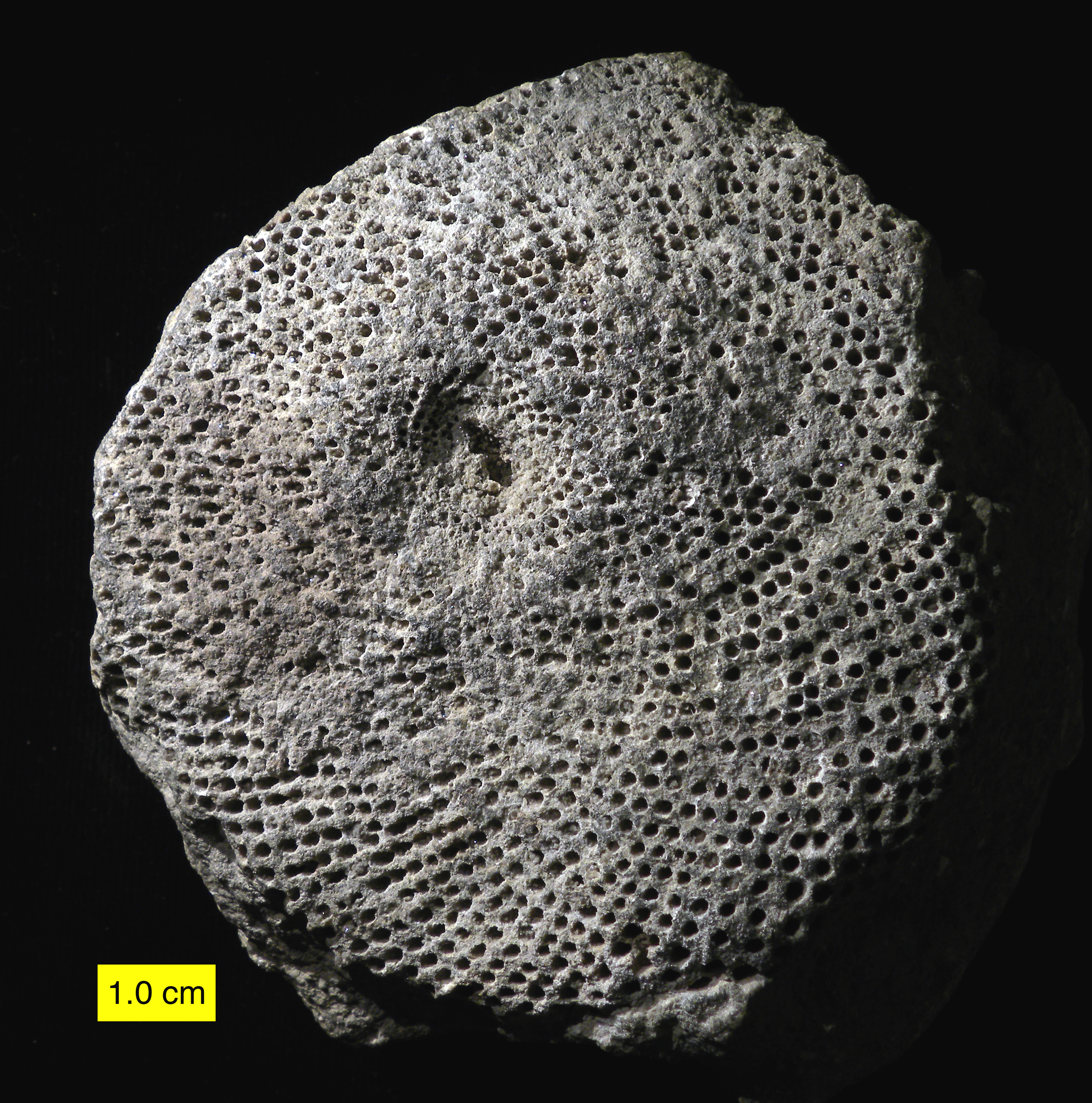
Receptaculitid from the Kimmswick Limestone (Middle Ordovician) near Ozora, Missouri.

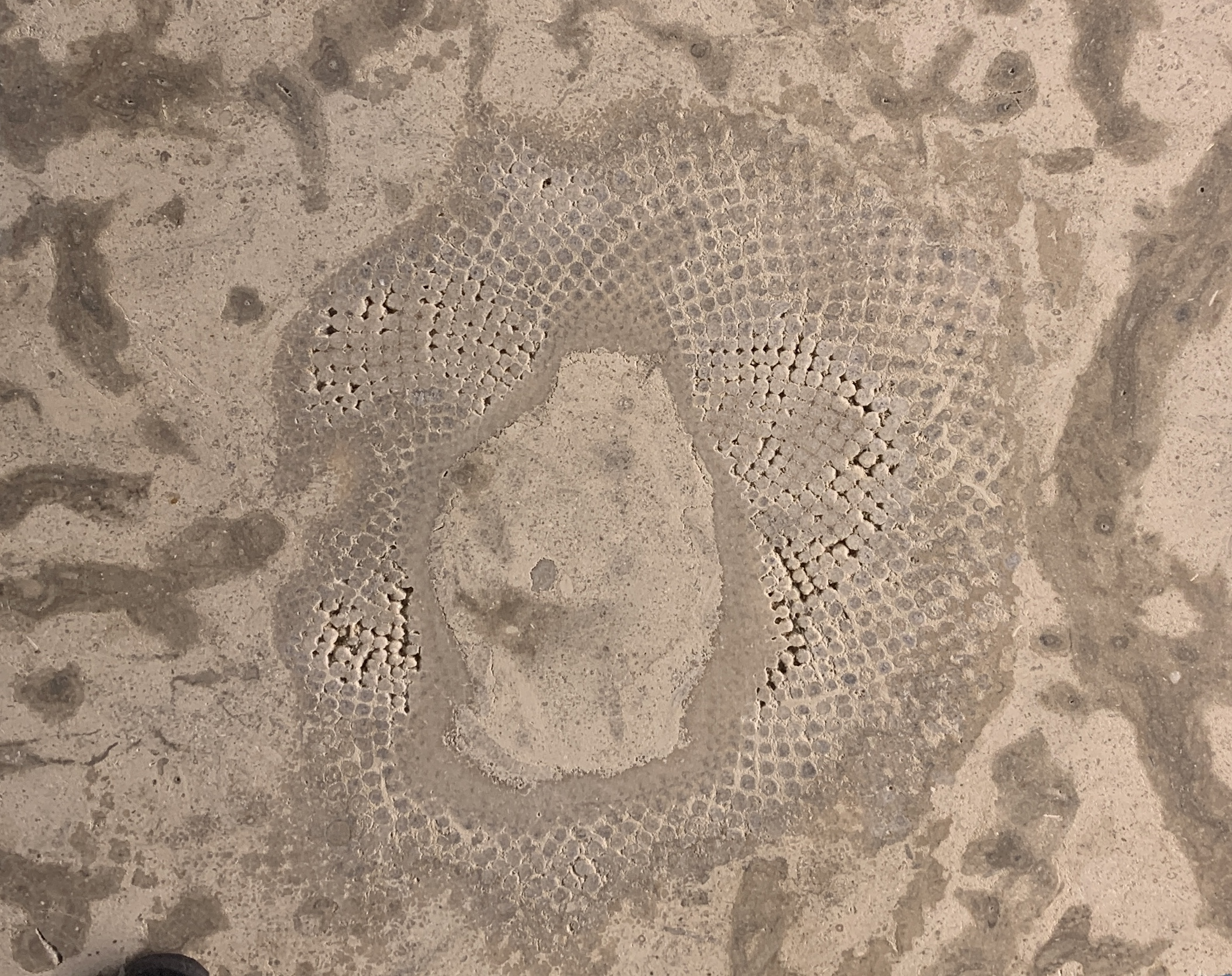
Receptaculites oweni, late Ordovician, Red River Formation, Garson, Manitoba.

Receptaculites and its relatives have a double-spiral, radiating pattern of rhombus-shaped plates supported by spindle-like objects called meroms. Fossils can usually be identified by the intersecting patterns of clockwise and counterclockwise rows of plates or stalk spaces, superficially similar to the arrangement of disk florets on a sunflower—hence the common name "sunflower coral".

Receptaculitids have sometimes been compared to the morphologically similar, but probably distantly related, cyclocrinitids.

Some dolomitic limestone deposits, such as Tyndall stone in Manitoba, Canada, are particularly rich in Receptaculites fossils.
