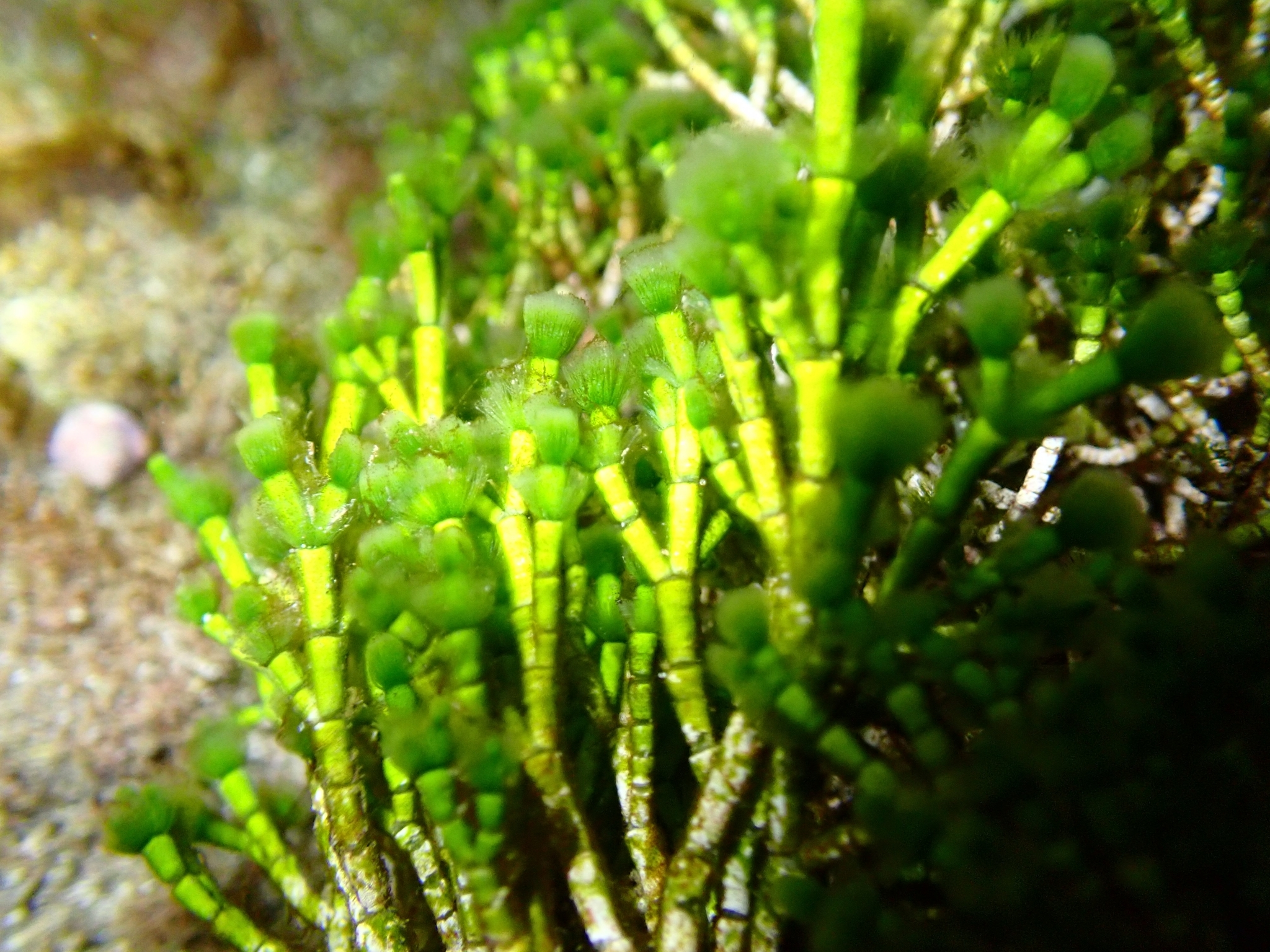
- Cymopolia barbata

Scientific classification
- Kingdom: Plantae
- Division: Chlorophyta
- Class: Ulvophyceae
- Order: Dasycladales
- Family: Dasycladaceae
- Genus: Cymopolia; J.V.Lamouroux

Species
- Cymopolia vanbosseae; Cymopolia barbata

= Cymopolia =

Genus of algae

Cymopolia is a genus of green algae in the family Dasycladaceae.
