= Cyclocrinitids =

Cyclocrinitids Temporal range: Middle Ordovician – Early Silurian

Scientific classification
- Kingdom: Plantae
- Division: Chlorophyta
- Class: Ulvophyceae
- Order: Dasycladales
- Informal group: †Cyclocrinitids

Informal group of green algae

Cyclocrinitids are early (mid-Ordovician–early-Silurian) Dasycladalean algae, resembling but probably not closely related to the Receptaculitids.
