= Shona M. Bell =

New Zealand palaeobotanist (1924–2011)

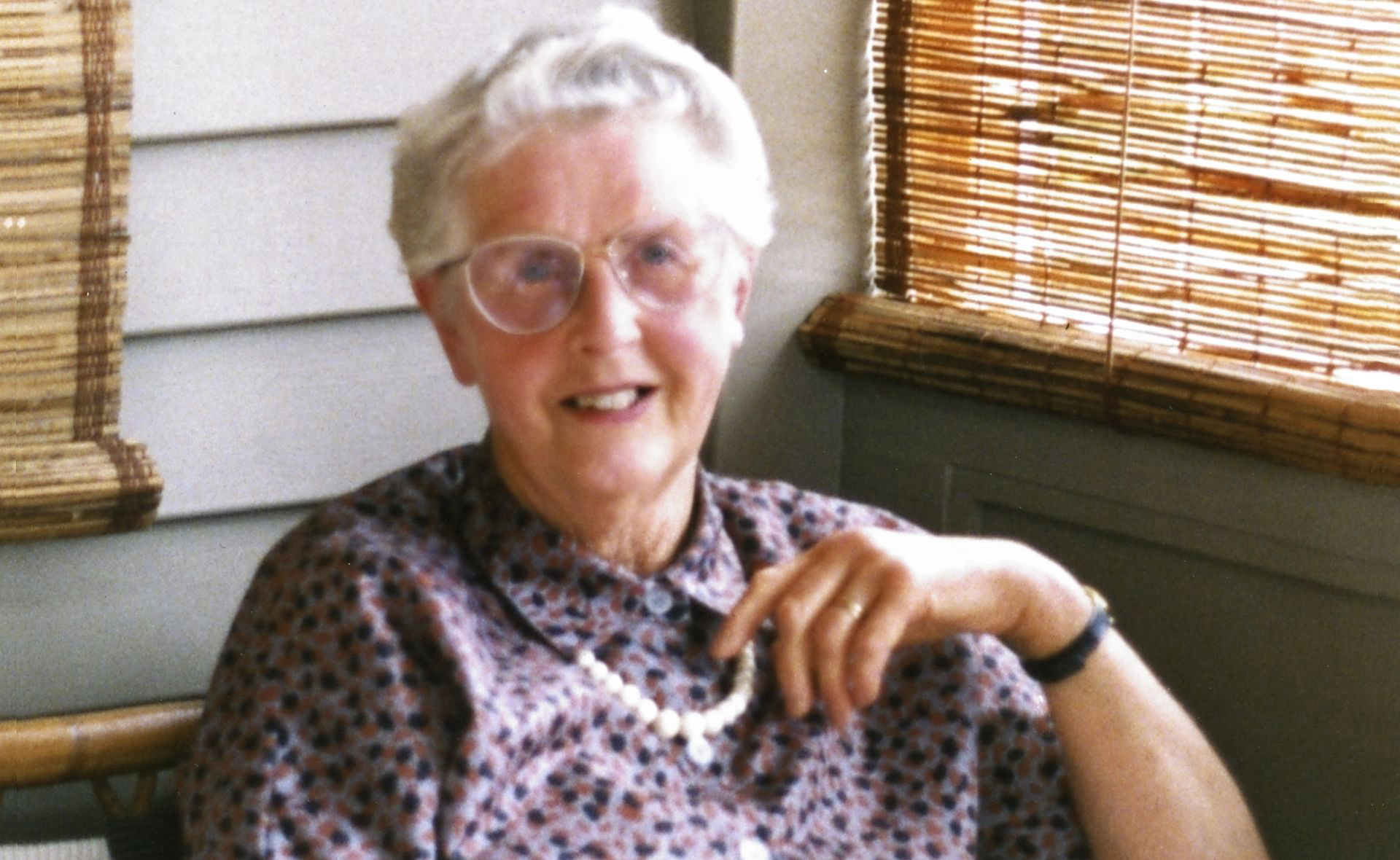
- Shona Grant-Taylor (Bell) 1992
- Born: Shona Margaret Bell; 19 April 1924; Birkenhead, New Zealand
- Died: 4 December 2011 (aged 87); Silverstream, New Zealand
- Education: University of New Zealand
- Spouse: Thomas Ludovic Grant-Taylor
- Children: Six children, Four daughters and two sons
- Parents: Lionel Samuel Fenton Bell (father); Dorothy Barbara Bell (née Ambrose) (mother)
- Scientific career
- Fields: Paleobotany
- Workplaces: Geological Survey of New Zealand
- Author abbrev. (botany): S.M. Bell

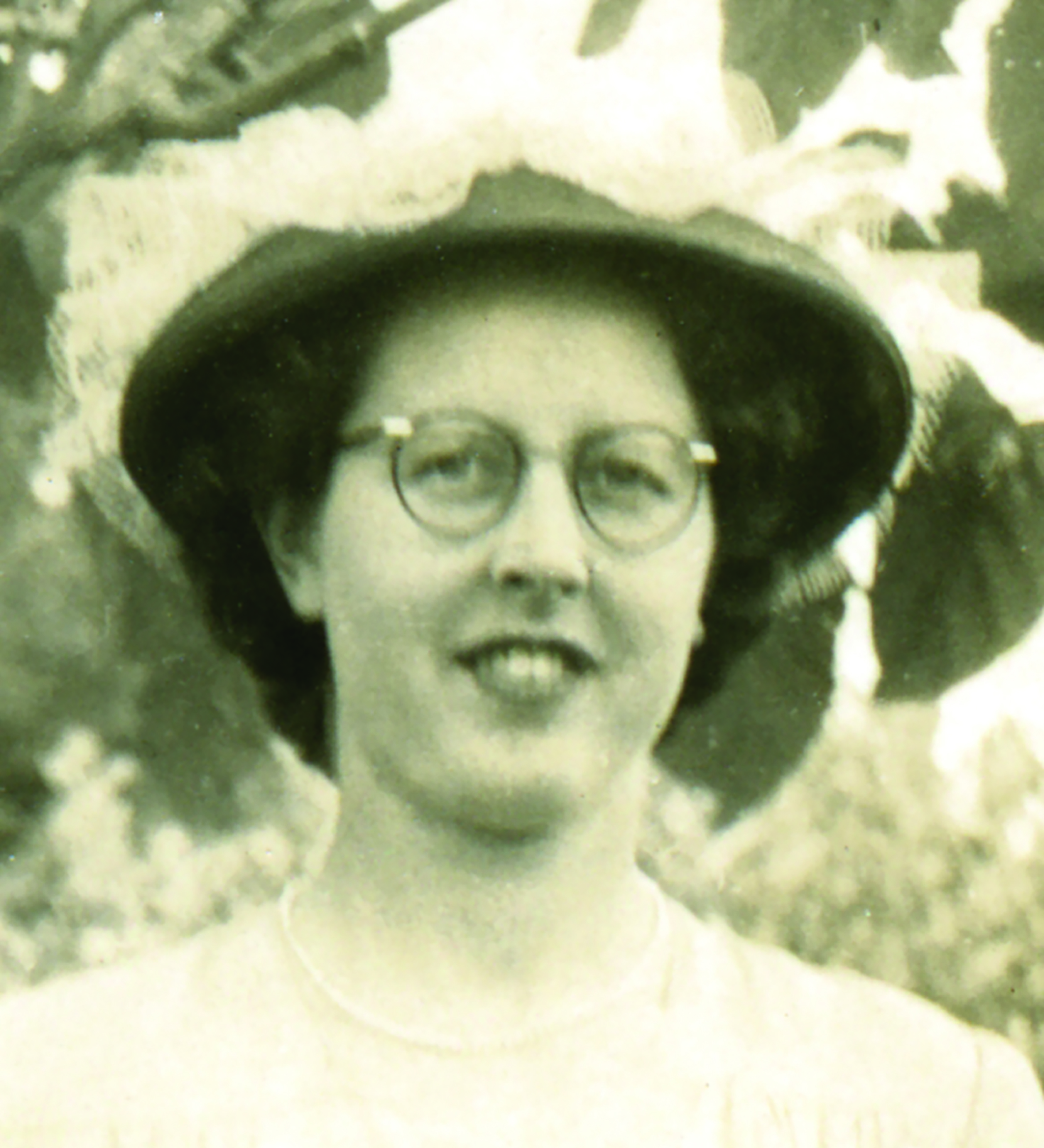
Shona Bell 1949

Shona Margaret Bell (married name Grant-Taylor, 19 April 1924 – 4 December 2011) was a New Zealand palaeontologist and paleobotanist.

== Early life and education ==
Bell was born on 19 April 1924 in the Auckland suburb of Birkenhead. Her parents were Dorothy Barbara Bell (née Ambrose) and Lionel Samuel Fenton Bell, who had married in 1922. Her mother was a school teacher at a commercial school in Christchurch and her father worked for the Union Bank in Auckland. By 1932, the Bell family was living in Waipukurau in the Hawke's Bay Region, where her father was the manager of the Union Bank. Shona Bell was Dux of Waipukurau School. In March 1938, they moved to Wellington, where her father had been appointed Chief Accountant at the Union Bank. When the Union Bank merged with the Bank of Australia he was appointed Chief Accountant but retired soon after.

Bell attended Wellington East Girls school and was elected to the position of Head Girl in her final year. She passed the entrance examination and the medical preliminary in the 1939 University Entrance Examinations for Wellington. She achieved a Bachelor of Science in Geology at the University of New Zealand in 1945.

== Academic career ==
Bell studied the fossils of the Corbies Creek area of North Otago and the Benmore Dam area, where she was the first to describe fossil plants. Among them were three new plant species: Chiropteris biloba, Chiropteris waitakiensis and Linguifolium waitakiense. The 1954 Directory of New Zealand Science records her as an assistant palaeontologist at the Geological Survey of New Zealand, where she worked from 1948 to 1950 on fossil leaf impressions to assist in the dating of late Cretaceous and early Cenozoic coal measures.

In 2011 a newly discovered genus of fossil in the Codiaceae family was named Shonabellia in her honour by Gregory Retallack. The type species Shonabellia verrucosa was found near Benmore Dam.

She was the first woman palaeobotanist in the Southern Hemisphere.

Her author abbreviation used when citing a botanical name is S.M.Bell.

== Personal life ==
Bell married Thomas Grant-Taylor May 1950 and resigned from her career as a paleobotanist, as was expected at the time. Bell's husband died in 1982. She died at the Heretaunga Home in Silverstream, a suburb of Upper Hutt on 4 December 2011.
