= Hidden Lake Formation =

Geologic formation in Antarctica

- Stratigraphic range: Coniacian
- Type: Geological formation
- Unit of: Gustav Group
- Underlies: Santa Marta Formation
- Overlies: Whisky Bay Formation

Lithology
- Primary: Sandstone
- Other: Siltstone

Location
- Coordinates: 63.0°S 57.0°W
- Approximate paleocoordinates: 63.1°S 63.9°W
- Region: James Ross Island, James Ross Island group
- Country: Argentine Antarctica, British Antarctic Territory, Chilean Antarctic Territory

Type section
- Named for: Hidden Lake
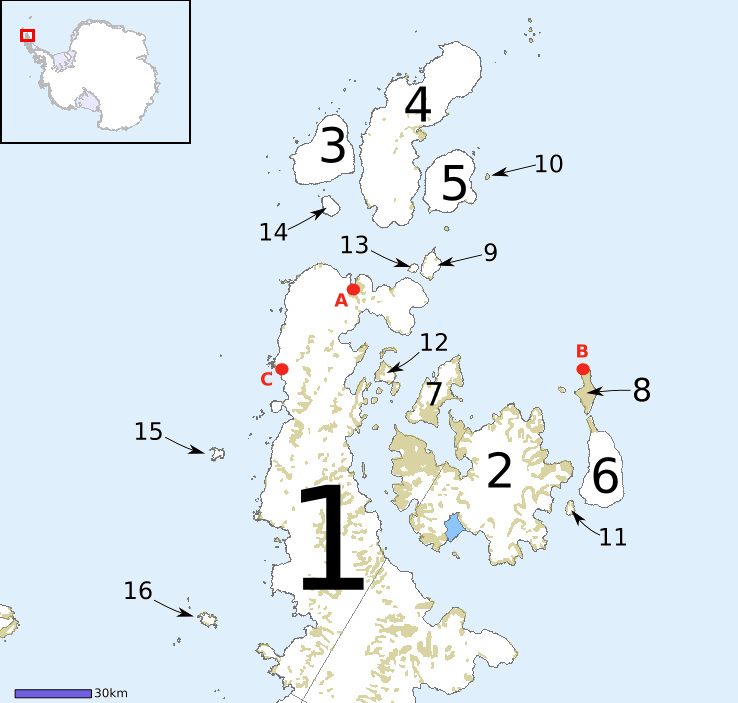
- Map of James Ross Island group James Ross Island is number 2

The Hidden Lake Formation is a Late Cretaceous geologic formation in Antarctica. The sandstones and siltstones of the formation were deposited in a deltaic environment.

Indeterminate megalosaur remains have been recovered from it. Also many plant fossils and ichnofossils of Planolites sp. and Palaeophycus sp. have been found in the formation.

== Paleofauna ==
- Megalosauroidea indet.
- Palaeophycus sp.
- Planolites sp.

== Flora ==
- Antarctoxylon mixai
- Dicotylophyllum
- Elatocladus cf. heterophylla
- Lygodium sp.
- Microphyllopteris sp.

== See also ==
- List of dinosaur-bearing rock formations
  - List of stratigraphic units with indeterminate dinosaur fossils
- List of fossiliferous stratigraphic units in Antarctica
  - Snow Hill Island Formation
