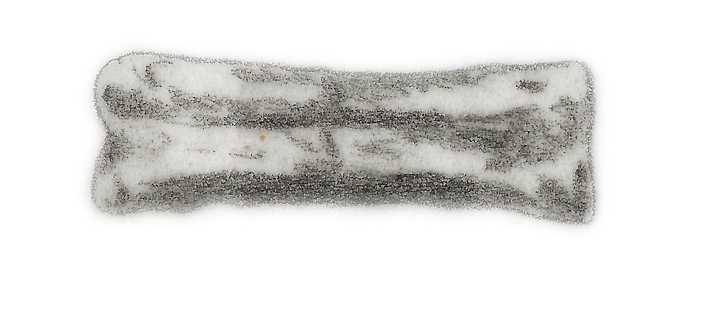
- Vertebra

Scientific classification
- Kingdom: Animalia
- Phylum: Chordata
- Class: Reptilia
- Clade: Dinosauria
- Clade: Saurischia
- Clade: Theropoda
- Genus: †Teinurosaurus; Nopcsa, 1928

Type species
- †Teinurosaurus sauvagei von Huene, 1932

Synonyms
- Caudocelus von Huene, 1932; Cumnoria aff. prestwichi Sauvage, 1897; Teinourosaurus Nopsca, 1924 (informal)

= Teinurosaurus =

Teinurosaurus Temporal range: Late Jurassic, Tithonian

Extinct genus of dinosaurs

Teinurosaurus is a genus of carnivorous theropod dinosaur that lived during the Late Jurassic in what is now France. The type species is Teinurosaurus sauvagei. It has been estimated to be 11.4 m (37 ft) in length and 3.6 t (4.0 short tons) in weight.

== Discovery and taxonomy ==
The holotype was discovered in 1897. Also in 1897, French paleontologist Henri-Émile Sauvage referred a tail vertebra from the Tithonian Mont-Lambert Formation of France, catalogued in the collection of the Musée Géologique du Boulonnais at Boulogne-sur-Mer in France, to Iguanodon prestwichii (now Cumnoria prestwichii), a herbivorous iguanodont.

In 1928 Baron Franz Nopcsa recognised the fossil to be the vertebra of a theropod not an ornithopod. He decided to name it as the genus Teinurosaurus. However, by a mistake of the printer, the footnote in which the new name was mentioned was not placed at the end of the section referring to the fossil but adjacent to a citation of Saurornithoides Osborn 1924, giving the false impression Nopcsa intended to rename the latter genus. After having discovered the typographical error, Nopcsa in 1929 added an addendum to the article, correcting the mistake.

In 1932 German paleontologist Friedrich von Huene again named the fossil, giving it the species name Caudocoelus sauvagei. "Caudocoelus" means "hollow tail" in Latin. The specific epithet honours Sauvage. The name Teinurosaurus was largely forgotten or not even understood to be a synonym of Caudocoelus, until in 1969 John Ostrom revealed its priority. Ostrom also pointed out that Nopcsa had not provided a specific name. In 1978 George Olshevsky was the first to combine the two names, making Teinurosaurus sauvagei (von Huene 1932) Olshevsky 1978 vide Nopcsa 1928 emend. 1929 a valid species name.

The holotype (originally catalogued MGB 500 now BHN2R 240) is a distal caudal vertebra, 152 millimetres long. A number of authors (e.g. Lapparent 1967; Galton 1982) believed that the holotype was destroyed in World War II, but the specimen is still extant, as noted by Buffetaut et al. (1991).

Teinurosaurus was considered by von Huene to be a member Coeluridae, but is now generally seen as a nomen dubium at Averostra incertae sedis.
