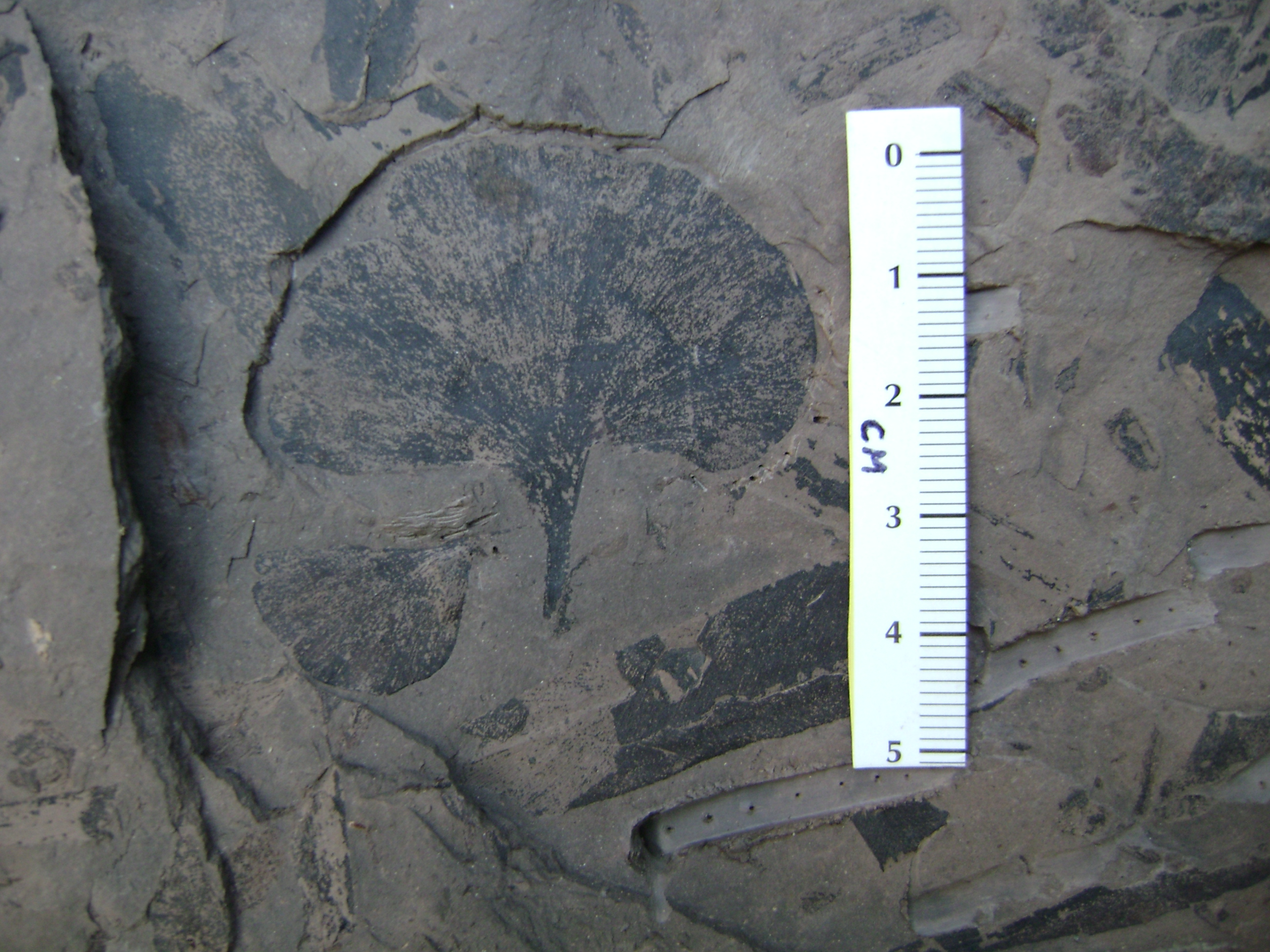

Scientific classification
- Kingdom: Plantae
- Clade: Tracheophytes
- Division: Polypodiophyta
- Class: Polypodiopsida
- Order: Gleicheniales
- Family: Dipteridaceae
- Genus: †Chiropteris

Species
- C. digitata Kurr. 1858 (Type species); C. copiapensis Solms, 1899; C. zeilleri Seward, 1903; C. barrealensis Frenguelli, 1942; C. reniformis Kawasaki, 1925; C. harrisii Archangelsky, 1960

= Chiropteris =

Chiropteris Temporal range: 295–155 Ma

Extinct genus of ferns

Chiropteris is an extinct genus of plants that existed from the Early Permian (Sakmarian stage) to the Late Jurassic (?Oxfordian stage, maybe latter).

It is unknown whether it belongs in the Matoniaceae or the Dipteridaceae.

== Description ==
The genus Chiropteris was named from fragmentary and whole-plant fossils. It was constituted of a short 25cm long petiole and a 16cm diameter circular leaf.

== Location ==
In Brazil, fossil of genus Chiropteris, was located on outcrop in the municipalities of São Jerônimo and Mariana Pimentel. They are in the geopark Paleorrota in Rio Bonito Formation and date from Sakmarian in Permian.
