= Triploporellaceae =

Scientific classification
- Kingdom: Plantae
- Division: Chlorophyta
- Class: Ulvophyceae
- Order: Dasycladales
- Family: †Triploporellaceae; Pia 1912

Genera
- See text

Extinct FAMILY of algae

Triploporellaceae is an extinct family of seaweed in the order Dasycladales.

== Subdivisions ==
Triploporellaceae contains 9 tribes and 57 genera, with a total of 202 valid species.

Selected genera include

- Chaetocladus
- Eocladus
- Palaeocymopolia
