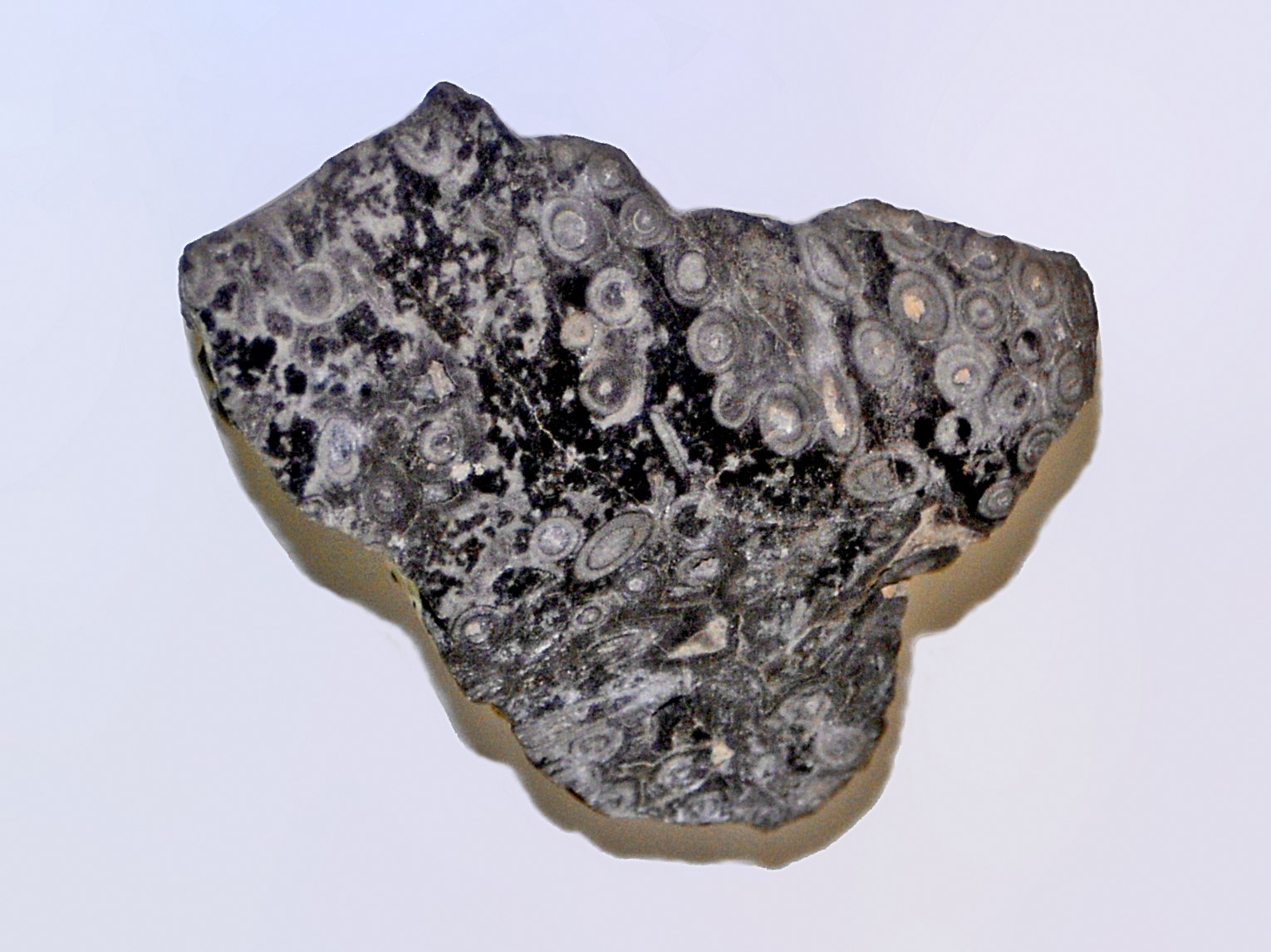
- Fossil Dasycladaceae from Triassic of Italy

Scientific classification
- Kingdom: Plantae
- Division: Chlorophyta
- Class: Ulvophyceae
- Order: Dasycladales
- Family: Dasycladaceae; Kützing, 1843

Genera
- See text

= Dasycladaceae =

Family of algae

The Dasycladaceae is one of the two extant families of green algae of the order Dasycladales. When found in Palaeozoic limestones, they typically indicate depositional depth of less than 5m.

Molecular phylogenetic studies indicate that the family Dasycladaceae is paraphyletic with respect to Polyphysaceae.

== Genera ==
- †Acicularia
- †Acroporella
- Amicus
- Anatolipora
- Andrusoporella
- Anfractuosoporella
- †Anisoporella
- †Anthracoporella
- †Archaeocladus
- †Atractyliopsis
- Batophora
- †Beresella
- Bornetella
- †Chinianella
- Chloroclados
- †Clavapora
- †Clavaporella
- Connexia
- Cylindroporella
- Cymopolia
- Dasycladus
- Dissocladella
- †Dvinella
- †Endoina
- †Eoclypeina
- Eogoniolina
- †Eovelebitella
- †Epimastopora
- †Euteutloporella
- †Favoporella
- †Fourcadella
- †Genotella
- †Goniolinopsis
- †Granieria
- †Gyroporella
- Halicoryne
- Holosporella
- †Imperiella
- †Kantia
- †Kochanskyella
- †Lacrymorphus
- †Macroporella
- †Mizzia
- †Nanjinoporella
- Neomeris
- †Oligoporella
- †Ollaria
- †Pentaporella
- †Permopora
- †Petrascula
- †Placklesia
- †Pseudoactinoporella
- †Salpingoporella
- †Tersella
- †Teutloporella
- †Thailandoporella
- †Uragiella
- †Uragiellopsis
- †Uraloporella
- †Velomorpha
- †Vermiporella
- †Xainzanella
- †Zaporella
