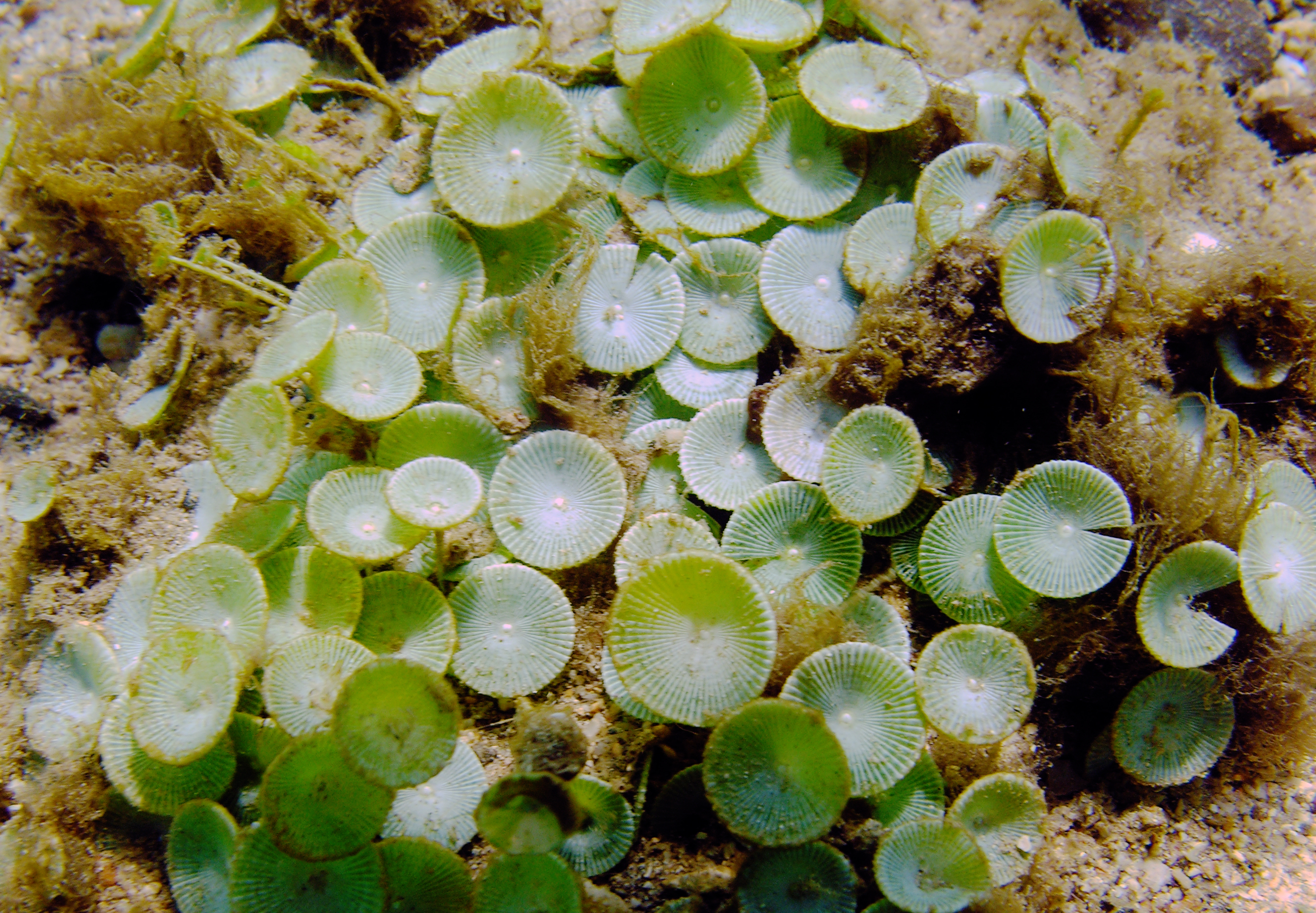

Scientific classification
- Kingdom: Plantae
- Division: Chlorophyta
- Class: Ulvophyceae
- Order: Dasycladales; Pascher 1931

Families
- Dasycladaceae; Polyphysaceae; †Bornetellaceae; †Cyclocrinitaceae; †Diploporaceae; †Koninckoporaceae; †Microcodiaceae; †Receptaculitaceae(?); †Timanellaceae; †Triploporellaceae

= Dasycladales =

Dasycladales Temporal range: Cambrian Stage 3 – Recent Ordovician to present

Order of algae

Dasycladales is an order of large unicellular green algae in the class Ulvophyceae. It contains two extant families, the Dasycladaceae and the Polyphysaceae.

These single celled algae are from 2 mm to 200 mm long. They live on substrates in shallow warm (>20 °C) euhaline tropical marine waters, usually less than 20 meters deep, and protected from waves. They are very large cells. They are able to attain these sizes without numerous internal cell wells because they build calcium carbonate shells around themselves.

They contain only one nucleus in their vegetative stage, which remains in the bottom of the cell in the holdfast at the substrate. Only when they are ready to produce gametes does the nucleus undergo meiosis and then numerous mitoses into many nuclei which then migrate into the gametangia at the top of the alga.

Because the nucleus is safely hidden in the holdfast, the cells easily regenerate if the top portions are broken off.

These algae are notable for having an intracellular network of 10 nm proteinaceous filaments, possibly for the storage and transport of ribonucleoprotein particles.

Because of all these properties, and the fact that they are easy to manipulate they have been favorite organisms in the study of the role of the nucleus vs the unnucleated cytoplasm in the behavior of cells.

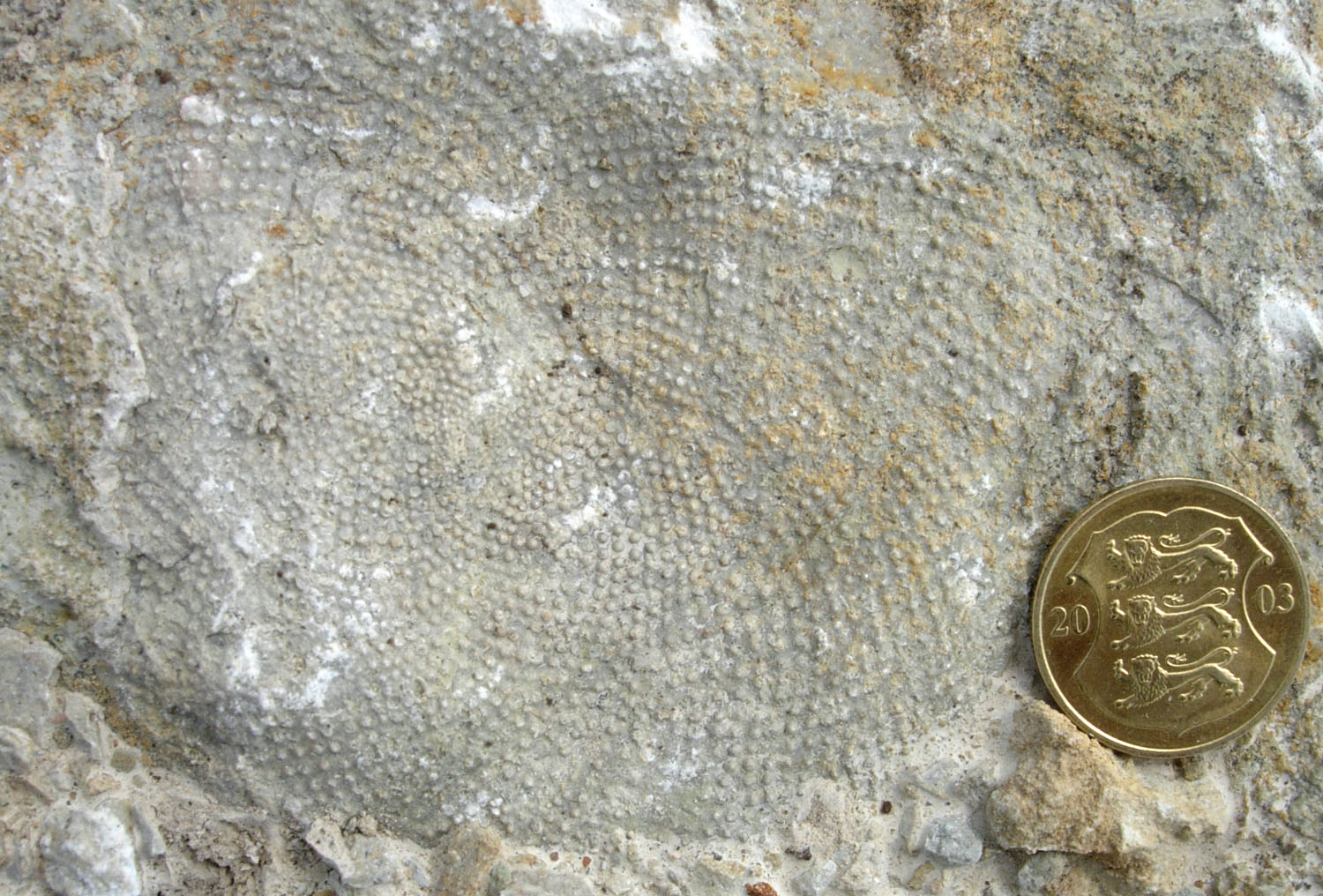
A fossil receptaculitid, considered a member of the Order Dasycladales; Ordovician of Estonia.

== Mineralization ==
Dasyclads mineralize in aragonite or high-magnesium calcite (never both in the same species); some extant examples also contain extracellular secretions of weddellite (calcium oxalate, CaC_{2}O_{4}), secreted in the mucilage layer. Calcification can occur in (i) cell walls, potentially continuing into cell lumina; (ii), vacuoles, before transport to cell walls or mucilage; (iii) within cell lumens; (iv) the mucilage layer, (v) externally to the mucilage layer; typically without biological mediation.

The calcium carbonate typically forms needle-like crystals, sometimes forming layers with different orientations corresponding to later stages of mineralization, but idiosyncratic microstructures characterize specific taxa.

== Fossil record ==
Because they deposit calcium carbonate around themselves, dasycladalean algae are well-represented in the fossil record. Cyclocrinitids are among their earliest fossil representatives.

Proposed Cambrian representatives (questionable) include: - Cambroporella - Amgaella - Yakutina - Seletonella - Mejerella
