= 2018 in paleobotany =

This article records new taxa of plants described during the year 2018, as well as other significant discoveries and events related to paleobotany that occurred in 2018.

== Flowering plants ==
Name	Novelty	Status	Authors	Age	Unit	Location	Notes	Images
Alloberberis axelrodii	Sp. nov	Valid	Doweld	Miocene		United States (Nevada)	A member of the family Berberidaceae; a replacement name for the previously invalidly published Mahonia sinuata Axelrod (1985), lacking holotype designation when published.	
Alloberberis caeruleomontana	Nom. nov	Valid	Doweld	Miocene		United States (Oregon)	A member of the family Berberidaceae; a replacement name for Ilex sinuata Chaney & Axelrod (1959).	
Anacolosidites eosenonicus	Sp. nov	Valid	Arai & Dias-Brito	Late Cretaceous (Santonian)	São Carlos Formation	Brazil	A pollen taxon, possibly a member of the family Loranthaceae.	
Aniba caucasica	Nom. nov	Valid	Doweld	Pliocene		Abkhazia	A species of Aniba; a replacement name for Aniba longifolia Kolakovsky & Schakryl (1958).	
Anisodromum upchurchii	Sp. nov	Valid	Wang & Dilcher	Early Cretaceous (Albian)	Dakota Formation	United States (Kansas)	A rosid described on the basis of fossil leaves.	
Annona nepalensis	Sp. nov	Valid	Prasad et al.	Miocene	Churia Formation	Nepal	A species of Annona.	
Araliaephyllum popovii	Sp. nov	Valid	Golovneva	Early Cretaceous (Albian)		Russia	A member of Laurales described on the basis of fossil leaves.	
Archeampelos betulifolia	Sp. nov	Valid	Moiseeva, Kodrul & Herman	Paleocene	Zeya–Bureya Basin	Russia	A flowering plant described on the basis of fossil leaves, similar to leaves of members of the family Betulaceae.	
Austrovideira	Gen. et sp. nov	Valid	Rozefelds & Pace	Early Oligocene		Australia	A member of Vitaceae. Genus includes new species A. dettmannae.	
Berberis miopannonica	Nom. nov	Valid	Doweld	Miocene		Romania	A species of Berberis; a replacement name for Berberis lanceolata Givulescu (1985).	
Berberis notata	Nom. nov	Valid	Doweld	Miocene		Austria	A species of Berberis; a replacement name for Ilex ambigua Unger (1847) and Berberis ambigua Kovar-Eder & Kvaček (2004).	
Berryoxylon	Gen. et sp. nov	Valid	Awasthi, Mehrotra & Shukla	Late Miocene–early Pliocene	Cuddalore Sandstone Formation	India	A fossil wood showing affinities with members of the genus Berrya. Genus includes new species B. cuddalorensis.	
Bignonioxylon	Gen. et sp. nov	Valid	Moya & Brea	Late Pleistocene	Arroyo Feliciano Formation	Argentina	A member of Bignoniaceae described on the basis of fossil wood. Genus includes new species B. americanum.	
Burretiodendron guangxiensis	Sp. nov	Valid	Dong & Sun in Dong et al.	Oligocene	Ningming Formation	China	A species of Burretiodendron.	
Buxus pliosinica	Sp. nov	Valid	Huang, Su & Zhou	Late Pliocene	Sanying Formation	China	A species of Buxus.	
Canarium guangxiensis	Sp. nov	Valid	Han & Manchester in Han et al.	Late Oligocene to late Miocene	Erzitang Formation; Foluo Formation; Yongning Formation	China	A species of Canarium	
Carlquistoxylon australe	Sp. nov	Valid	Pujana et al.	Early Cretaceous (late Albian)	Cerro Barcino Formation	Argentina	A flowering plant of uncertain phylogenetic placement, described on the basis of fossil wood.	
Castanopsis guangxiensis	Sp. nov	Valid	Huang et al.	Late Oligocene	Yongning Formation	China	A species of Castanopsis.	
Castanopsis nanningensis	Sp. nov	Valid	Huang et al.	Late Oligocene	Yongning Formation	China	A species of Castanopsis.	
Chenocybus	Gen. et sp. nov	Valid	Poinar	Late Cretaceous (Cenomanian)	Burmese amber	Myanmar	A flowering plant of uncertain phylogenetic placement. Genus includes new species C. allodapus.	
Chisochetonoxylon vastanensis	Sp. nov	Valid	Shukla & Mehrota	Early Eocene	Cambay Shale Formation	India	A member of the family Meliaceae described on the basis of fossil wood.	
Cladium transdnestrovicum	Nom. nov	Valid	Doweld	Miocene (Serravallian)		Transnistria	A species of Cladium; a replacement name for Cladium crassum Negru (1972), preoccupied by extant C. crassum (Thwaites) Kükenthal.	
Clerodendrum sarmatiacum	Nom. nov	Valid	Doweld	Miocene		Russia (Rostov Oblast)	A species of Clerodendrum; a replacement name for Clerodendrum ovalifolium Baikovskaja in Kryshtofovich & Baikovskaja (1965).	
Cobbania pharao	Sp. nov	Valid	Coiffard & Mohr	Late Cretaceous (Campanian)	Quseir Formation	Egypt	A member of the family Araceae belonging or related to the subfamily Aroideae.	
Concavistylon	Gen. et 2 sp. nov	Valid	Manchester, Pigg & Devore	Early Eocene to Middle Miocene	Little Butte Volcanic Series	United States(Oregon)	A Trochodendraceae genus. Type species C. kvacekii Manchester, Pigg & Devore (2018) from Oregon; C. wehrii Manchester et al. (2018) from Washington state and British Columbia was originally described as a second species of this genus, but subsequently it was transferred to the separate genus Paraconcavistylon.	
Craspedodromophyllum boguchanicum	Sp. nov	Valid	Moiseeva, Kodrul & Herman	Paleocene	Zeya–Bureya Basin	Russia	A member of the family Betulaceae.	
Cretaceoxylon	Gen. et sp. nov	Valid	Pujana in Pujana et al.	Late Cretaceous (Campanian)	Santa Marta Formation	Antarctica (James Ross Island)	A eudicot of uncertain phylogenetic placement, described on the basis of fossil wood. Genus includes new species C. heteropunctatum.	
Cryptocaryoxylon lemnium	Sp. nov	Valid	Mantzouka	Early Miocene		Greece	A member of the family Lauraceae.	
Cryptocaryoxylon lesbium	Sp. nov	Valid	Mantzouka	Early Miocene		Greece	A member of the family Lauraceae.	
Cussoniophyllum	Nom. nov	Valid	Doweld	Late Cretaceous (Cenomanian)		Czech Republic	A flowering plant described on the basis of fossil leaves; a replacement name for the invalidly published Cussoniphyllum Velenovský (1889). Genus includes "Cussonia" partita Velenovský (1882).	
Cyperus maii	Nom. nov	Valid	Doweld	Miocene		Germany	A species of Cyperus; a replacement name for Dichostylis macrocarpa Mai (1987).	
Cyperus waltheri	Nom. nov	Valid	Doweld	Miocene		Germany	A species of Cyperus; a replacement name for Dichostylis minor Mai in Mai & Walther (1991).	
Dakotanthus	Gen. et comb. nov	Valid	Manchester et al.	Cretaceous (late Albian to Cenomanian)	Dakota Formation; Woodbine Formation	United States (Kansas; Nebraska; Texas)	An early eudicot; a new genus for "Carpites" cordiformis Lesquereux (1892).	
Dalbergioxylon biseriatensis	Sp. nov	Valid	Cheng et al.	Pliocene	Yuanmou Basin	China	A member of the family Fabaceae described on the basis of fossil wood.	
Diaphoranthus	Gen. et sp. nov	Junior homonym	Poinar	Late Cretaceous (Cenomanian)	Burmese amber	Myanmar	A flowering plant of uncertain phylogenetic placement. Genus includes new species D. burmensis. The generic name is preoccupied by Diaphoranthus Meyen (1834); Poinar (2019) coined a replacement name Exalloanthum.	
Dicotylophyllum skogii	Sp. nov	Valid	Wang & Dilcher	Early Cretaceous (Albian)	Dakota Formation	United States (Kansas)	A flowering plant of uncertain phylogenetic placement, described on the basis of fossil leaves.	
Dioscorites palauensis	Sp. nov	Valid	Guzmán-Vázquez, Calvillo-Canadell & Sánchez-Beristain	Late Cretaceous	Olmos Formation	Mexico	A member of the family Dioscoreaceae.	
Diplosophyllum	Nom. nov	Valid	Doweld	Late Cretaceous (Cenomanian)		Czech Republic; Germany	A flowering plant described on the basis of fossil leaves; a replacement name for the preoccupied Diplophyllum Velenovský & Viniklář (1929). Genus includes "Inga" cottae Ettingshausen (1867), "Diplophyllum" cretaceum Velenovský & Viniklář (1929), "Hymenaea" elongata Velenovský (1884), "Hymenaea" inaequalis Velenovský (1884) and "Hymenaea" primigenia de Saporta in Velenovský (1884).	
Dipterocarpuspollenites cretacea	Sp. nov	Valid	Prasad et al.	Late Cretaceous (Maastrichtian)		India	A pollen taxon belonging to the family Dipterocarpaceae.	
Donlesia cheyennensis	Sp. nov	Valid	Wang & Dilcher	Early Cretaceous (Albian)	Cheyenne Sandstone	United States (Kansas)	A member of the family Ceratophyllaceae.	
Ebenoxylon cuddalorensis	Sp. nov	Valid	Awasthi, Mehrotra & Shukla	Late Miocene–early Pliocene	Cuddalore Sandstone Formation	India	A fossil wood showing affinities with members of the family Ebenaceae.	
Edencarpa	Gen. et sp. nov	Valid	Atkinson, Stockey & Rothwell	Late Cretaceous (early Coniacian)		Canada (British Columbia)	A member of Cornales. Genus includes new species E. grandis.	
Endobeuthos	Gen. et sp. nov	Valid	Poinar & Chambers	Late Cretaceous (Cenomanian)	Burmese amber	Myanmar	A flowering plant of uncertain phylogenetic placement. Originally described as a possible relative of members of the family Dilleniaceae; Chambers & Poinar (2023) subsequently reinterpreted it as a member of the family Proteaceae, but this interpretation was rejected by Lamont & Ladd (2024). Genus includes new species E. paleosum.	
Eucalyptoxylon cuddalorensis	Sp. nov	Valid	Awasthi, Mehrotra & Shukla	Late Miocene–early Pliocene	Cuddalore Sandstone Formation	India	A fossil wood showing affinities with members of the genus Eucalyptus.	
Euphorbia pontiana	Nom. nov	Valid	Doweld	Miocene		Ukraine	A species of Euphorbia; a replacement name for Euphorbia cylindrica Negru (1979).	
Eydeia vancouverensis	Sp. nov	Valid	Atkinson, Stockey & Rothwell	Late Cretaceous (early Coniacian)		Canada (British Columbia)	A member of Cornales.	
Ficophyllum angustifolium	Nom. nov	Valid	Doweld	Late Cretaceous (Campanian)		Germany	A replacement name for Ficus angustifolia Hosius (1869).	
Ficophyllum antiquum	Nom. nov	Valid	Doweld	Late Cretaceous (Campanian)		Germany	A replacement name for Ficus crassinervis Hosius (1869).	
Ficophyllum hosii	Nom. nov	Valid	Doweld	Late Cretaceous (Santonian)		Germany	A replacement name for Ficus laurifolia Hosius & Marck (1880).	
Ficophyllum magnolioides	Nom. nov	Valid	Doweld	Early Cretaceous (Albian)	Dakota Formation	United States (Kansas)	A replacement name for Ficus magnoliifolia Lesquereux (1883).	
Ficophyllum marckii	Nom. nov	Valid	Doweld	Late Cretaceous (Campanian)		Germany	A replacement name for Ficus elongata Hosius (1869).	
Ficus aenigmatica	Nom. nov	Valid	Doweld	Eocene	Wilcox Formation	United States (Mississippi)	A species of Ficus; a replacement name for Ficus schimperi Lesquereux (1868).	
Ficus microtrivia	Sp. nov	Valid	Huang & Zhou in Huang et al.	Miocene	Wenshan Basin	China	A species of Ficus.	
Ficus myrtoides	Nom. nov	Valid	Doweld	Eocene		United States (Mississippi)	A species of Ficus; a replacement name for Ficus myrtifolius Berry (1916).	
Ficus slovenica	Nom. nov	Valid	Doweld	Eocene		Slovenia	A species of Ficus; a replacement name for Ficus pilosa Ettingshausen (1872).	
Ficus venustoides	Nom. nov	Valid	Doweld	Oligocene (Chattian)		France	A species of Ficus; a replacement name for Ficus venusta Saporta (1861).	
Ficus venustula	Nom. nov	Valid	Doweld	Eocene		Croatia	A species of Ficus; a replacement name for Malpighiastrum venustum Unger (1860).	
Ficus yellowstonica	Nom. nov	Valid	Doweld	Paleocene		United States (Wyoming)	A species of Ficus; a replacement name for Ficus densifolia Knowlton (1899).	
Fissistigma nanningense	Sp. nov	Valid	Li et al.	Oligocene	Yongning Formation	China	A species of Fissistigma.	
Gardenia eocenicus	Sp. nov	Valid	Shukla, Mehrotra & Nawaz Ali	Early Eocene	Palana Formation	India	A species of Gardenia.	
Gastonispermum	Gen. et sp. nov	Valid	Friis, Crane & Pedersen	Early Cretaceous		Portugal	A flowering plant with affinities to Austrobaileyales or Nymphaeales. Genus includes new species G. portugallicum.	
Gleditsioxylon jiangsuensis	Sp. nov	Valid	Cheng et al.	Early Miocene		China	A member of Leguminosae described on the basis of fossil wood.	
Gmelina siwalika	Sp. nov	Valid	Khan, Bera & Bera in Khan et al.	Late Pliocene or early Pleistocene	Kimin Formation	India	A species of Gmelina.	
Goniothalamus miocenicus	Sp. nov	Valid	Prasad et al.	Late Miocene	Middle Churia Formation	Nepal	A species of Goniothalamus.	
Gouania miocenica	Sp. nov	Valid	Hernandez-Hernández & Castañeda-Posadas	Early Miocene	Mexican amber	Mexico	A species of Gouania.	
Hederago	Nom. nov	Valid	Doweld	Late Cretaceous (Cenomanian)		Czech Republic	A flowering plant described on the basis of fossil leaves; a replacement name for the invalidly published Hederophyllum Velenovský (1889). Genus includes "Hedera" credneriifolia Velenovský (1882) and "Hedera" primordialis de Saporta (1879).	
Hemitrapa alpina	Sp. nov	Valid	Su & Zhou in Su et al.	Early Oligocene		China	A member of the family Lythraceae. Originally described as a species of Hemitrapa, but subsequently transferred to the genus Primotrapa by Li et al. (2020).	
Hibiscus sarmatiacus	Sp. nov	Valid	Doweld	Miocene		Russia (Rostov Oblast)	A species of Hibiscus; a replacement name for the invalidly named Hibiscus splendens Baikovskaja.	
Holigarna palaeograhamii	Sp. nov	Valid	Shukla, Mehrotra & Nawaz Ali	Early Eocene	Palana Formation	India	A species of Holigarna.	
Hopenium tertiarum	Sp. nov	Valid	Awasthi, Mehrotra & Shukla	Late Miocene–early Pliocene	Cuddalore Sandstone Formation	India	A fossil wood showing affinities with members of the genus Hopea.	
Ipomoea meghalayensis	Sp. nov	Valid	Srivastava, Mehrotra & Dilcher	Paleocene (Thanetian)		India	A species of Ipomoea.	
Kirchheimeria	Gen. et comb. nov	Valid	Kowalski in Kowalski & Worobiec	Oligocene to Pliocene		Denmark; Germany; Poland; Russia (Kaliningrad Oblast)	A member of Ericaceae of uncertain phylogenetic placement. Genus includes "Elaeocarpus" globulus Menzel (1906).	
Kvacekispermum	Gen. et sp. nov	Valid	Friis, Crane & Pedersen	Early Cretaceous	Figueira da Foz Formation	Portugal	A member of the family Chloranthaceae. Genus includes new species K. rugosum.	
Lachnociona camptostylus	Sp. nov	Valid	Poinar & Chambers	Late Cretaceous (Cenomanian)	Burmese amber	Myanmar	A flowering plant of uncertain phylogenetic placement, most similar to members of the families Brunelliaceae and Cunoniaceae.	
Lacinipetalum	Gen. et sp. nov	Valid	Jud et al.	Paleocene (early Danian)	Upper Salamanca Formation	Argentina	A member of Cunoniaceae. Genus includes new species L. spectabilum.	
Laurinoxylon rennerae	Sp. nov	Valid	Estrada-Ruiz et al.	Late Cretaceous (late Campanian)	McRae Formation	United States (New Mexico)	A member of Lauraceae described on the basis of fossil wood.	
Laurus ficoides	Nom. nov	Valid	Doweld	Eocene		France	A species of Laurus; a replacement name for Ficus reticulata Saporta (1863).	
Lefipania	Gen. et sp. nov	Valid	Martínez, Gandolfo & Cúneo	Late Cretaceous (Maastrichtian)	Lefipán Formation	Argentina	A flowering plant of uncertain phylogenetic placement, described on the basis of fossil leaves. Genus includes new species L. padillae.	
Leguminocarpum oguruiensis	Sp. nov	Valid	Yabe & Nakagawa	Miocene	Shimo Formation	Japan	A fossil legume fruit.	
Ligustrum miovulgare	Sp. nov	Valid	Doweld	Miocene		Russia (Rostov Oblast)	A species of Ligustrum; a replacement name for the invalidly named Ligustrum vulgare var. fossilis Baikovskaja.	
Lijinganthus	Gen. et sp. nov	Valid	Liu et al.	Late Cretaceous (Cenomanian)	Burmese amber	Myanmar	A member of Pentapetalae of uncertain phylogenetic placement. Genus includes new species L. revoluta.	
Limnobiophyllum stockeyana	Sp. nov	Valid	Coiffard & Mohr	Late Cretaceous (Campanian)	Quseir Formation	Egypt	A member of the family Araceae belonging to the subfamily Lemnoideae.	
Liquidambar fujianensis	Sp. nov	Valid	Dong et al.	Middle Miocene	Fotan Group	China	A species of Liquidambar.	
Lithocarpoxylon microporosum	Sp. nov	Valid	Cheng et al.	Pliocene	Yuanmou Basin	China	A member of the family Fagaceae described on the basis of fossil wood.	
Lithocarpoxylon nanningensis	Sp. nov	Valid	Huang et al.	Late Oligocene	Yongning Formation	China	A member of Fagaceae described on the basis of fossil wood.	
Litseoxylon	Gen. et sp. nov	Valid	Huang et al.	Late Oligocene	Yongning Formation	China	A member of the family Lauraceae. Genus includes new species L. nanningensis.	
Luckowcarpa	Gen. et sp. nov	Valid	Martínez	Late Eocene	Esmeraldas Formation	Colombia	A member of Fabaceae belonging to the group Dalbergieae. Genus includes new species L. gunnii.	
Lusitanispermum	Gen. et sp. nov	Valid	Friis, Crane & Pedersen	Early Cretaceous		Portugal	A flowering plant with affinities to Austrobaileyales or Nymphaeales. Genus includes new species L. choffatii.	
Lycopus europleistocenicus	Sp. nov	Valid	Doweld	Pleistocene		Belarus	A species of Lycopus; a replacement name for the invalidly named Lycopus intermedius Dorofeev (1963).	
Malus antiqua	Nom. nov	Valid	Doweld	Miocene		Romania	A species of Malus; a replacement name for Malus pulcherrima Givulescu (1980).	
Maytenoxylon	Gen. et sp. nov	Valid	Franco	Late Cenozoic	Ituzaingó Formation	Argentina	A member of Celastraceae described on the basis of fossil wood. Genus includes new species M. perforatum.	
Mcraeoxylon	Gen. et sp. nov	Valid	Estrada-Ruiz et al.	Late Cretaceous (late Campanian)	McRae Formation	United States (New Mexico)	A flowering plant described on the basis of fossil wood, with a suite of features seen in several families of Malpighiales, Myrtales and Oxalidales. Genus includes new species M. waddellii.	
Meliosma antiqua	Nom. nov	Valid	Doweld	Oligocene		United Kingdom	A species of Meliosma; a replacement name for Calvarinus reticulatus Reid & Reid (1910).	
Menispermites calderensis	Sp. nov	Valid	Jud et al.	Eocene (Ypresian)	Huitrera Formation	Argentina	A member of the family Menispermaceae described on the basis of fossil leaves.	
Menispermites olmosensis	Sp. nov	Valid	Guzmán-Vázquez, Calvillo-Canadell & Sánchez-Beristain	Late Cretaceous	Olmos Formation	Mexico	A member of the family Menispermaceae.	
Nelumbo jiayinensis	Sp. nov	Valid	Liang et al.	Late Cretaceous (Santonian)	Yong'ancun Formation	China	A species of Nelumbo.	
Neofructus	Gen. et sp. nov	Valid	Liu & Wang	Early Cretaceous (Barremian–Aptian)	Yixian Formation	China	An early flowering plant. Genus includes new species N. lingyuanensis.	
Nitaspermum	Gen. et 5 sp. nov	Valid	Friis, Crane & Pedersen	Early Cretaceous (Albian)	Potomac Group	United States (Maryland; Virginia)	A fossil seed with affinities to Austrobaileyales and Nymphaeales. Genus includes new species N. taylorii, N. hopewellense, N. crassum, N. virginiense and N. marylandense.	
Nyssa givulescui	Nom. nov	Valid	Doweld	Oligocene		Romania	A tupelo; a replacement name for Nyssa maxima Givulescu, Petrescu & Barbu (1997).	
Obamacarpa	Gen. et sp. nov	Valid	Atkinson, Stockey & Rothwell	Late Cretaceous (early Coniacian)		Canada (British Columbia)	A member of Cornales. Genus includes new species O. edenensis.	
Ocotea undulatoides	Nom. nov	Valid	Doweld	Miocene		Germany	A species of Ocotea; a replacement name for Laurophyllum undulatum Weyland & Kilpper (1963).	
Paisia	Gen. et sp. nov	Valid	Friis, Mendes & Pedersen	Early Cretaceous (late Barremian–early Albian)	Almargem Formation	Portugal	An early eudicot. Genus includes new species P. pantoporata.	
Palaeocarya huashanensis	Sp. nov	Valid	Chen et al.	Oligocene	Ningming Formation	China	A member of the family Juglandaceae.	
Paleoallium	Gen. et sp. nov	Valid	Pigg, Bryan & DeVore	Eocene; Ypresian	Okanagan Highlands; Klondike Mountain Formation	United States; Washington	A monocot similar to members of Amaryllidaceae. Genus includes new species P. billgenseli.	Paleoallium billgenseli
Paliurus hirsuta	Sp. nov	Valid	Dong & Sun in Dong et al.	Middle Miocene	Fotan Group	China	A species of Paliurus.	
Palmoxylon araneus	Sp. nov	Valid	Nour-El-Deen, El-Saadawi & Thomas	Oligocene (Rupelian)	Jebel Qatrani Formation	Egypt		
Palmoxylon elsaadawii	Sp. nov	Valid	Nour-El-Deen & Thomas in Nour-El-Deen, Thomas & El-Saadawi	Oligocene (Rupelian)	Jebel Qatrani Formation	Egypt		
Palmoxylon qatraniense	Sp. nov	Valid	Nour-El-Deen, El-Saadawi & Thomas	Oligocene (Rupelian)	Jebel Qatrani Formation	Egypt		
Paraalbizioxylon sinica	Sp. nov	Valid	Cheng et al.	Pliocene	Yuanmou Basin	China	A member of the family Fabaceae described on the basis of fossil wood.	
Paraalbizioxylon yunnanensis	Sp. nov	Valid	Cheng et al.	Pliocene	Yuanmou Basin	China	A member of the family Fabaceae described on the basis of fossil wood.	
Parahancornioxylon	Gen. et comb. nov	Valid	Moya, Brea & Lutz	Pliocene	Andalhualá Formation	Argentina	A member of Apocynaceae described on the basis of fossil wood; a new genus for "Menendoxylon" piptadiensis Lutz (1987).	
Paraphyllanthoxylon antarcticum	Sp. nov	Valid	Pujana in Pujana et al.	Late Cretaceous (Campanian)	Santa Marta Formation	Antarctica (James Ross Island)	A flowering plant of uncertain phylogenetic placement, described on the basis of fossil wood.	
Pazlia	Gen. et sp. nov	Valid	Friis, Crane & Pedersen	Early Cretaceous		Portugal	A flowering plant with affinities to Austrobaileyales or Nymphaeales. Genus includes new species P. hilaris.	
Pazliopsis	Gen. et sp. nov	Valid	Friis, Crane & Pedersen	Early Cretaceous	Almargem Formation	Portugal	A flowering plant with affinities to Austrobaileyales or Nymphaeales. Genus includes new species P. reyi.	
Pentacentron	Gen. et sp. nov	Valid	Manchester et al.	Eocene; Ypresian	Okanagan Highlands; Klondike Mountain Formation	United States; Washington	A member of the family Trochodendraceae. The type species is P. sternhartae.	Pentacentron sternhartae
Photinia sarmatiaca	Sp. nov	Valid	Doweld	Miocene		Russia (Rostov Oblast)	A species of Photinia; a replacement name for the invalidly named Photinia acuminata Baikovskaja in Kryshtofovich & Baikovskaja (1965).	
Pistacia miolentiscus	Nom. nov	Valid	Doweld	Miocene		Hungary	A species of Pistacia; a replacement name for Pistacia lentiscoides Andreánszky & Cziffery in Andreánszky (1959).	
Pistacia pliolentiscus	Nom. nov	Valid	Doweld	Pliocene		Netherlands	A species of Pistacia; a replacement name for Pistacia acuminata Reid & Reid (1915).	
Pistacioxylon ufuki	Sp. nov	Valid	Akkemik & Poole in Akkemik et al.	Early Miocene	Haymana Basin	Turkey	A Pistacia-like plant described on the basis of fossil wood.	
Polyalthioxylon arunachalensis	Sp. nov	Valid	Srivastava, Mehrotra & Srikarni	Late Pliocene–Early Pleistocene	Kimin Formation	India	A member of the family Annonaceae described on the basis of fossil wood.	
Priscophyllum	Nom. nov	Valid	Doweld	Late Cretaceous (Cenomanian)		Czech Republic	A flowering plant described on the basis of fossil leaves; a replacement name for the invalidly published Grevilleophyllum Velenovský (1889). Genus includes "Grevillea" constans Velenovský (1883).	
Prunus hirsutipetala	Sp. nov	Valid	Sokoloff, Remizowa & Nuraliev in Sokoloff et al.	Eocene	Rovno amber	Ukraine	A species of Prunus.	
Pseudoanacardium	Gen. et comb. nov	Valid	Manchester & Balmaki	Early Oligocene		Peru	A fossil fruit of uncertain phylogenetic placement; a new genus for "Anacardium" peruvianum Berry (1924).	
Pseudolimnobiophyllum	Gen. et sp. nov	Valid	Coiffard & Mohr	Late Cretaceous (Campanian)	Quseir Formation	Egypt	A member of the family Araceae belonging to the subfamily Lemnoideae. Genus includes new species P. simile.	
Pseudowinterapollis agatdalensis	Sp. nov	Valid	Grímsson & Zetter in Grímsson et al.	Paleocene (Danian)	Agatdal Formation	Greenland	A pollen taxon, a member of the family Winteraceae.	
Pterocaryoxylon huxii	Sp. nov	Valid	Cheng et al.	Pliocene	Yuanmou Basin	China	A member of the family Juglandaceae described on the basis of fossil wood.	
Pterygota eocenica	Sp. nov	Valid	Shukla, Mehrotra & Nawaz Ali	Early Eocene	Palana Formation	India	A species of Pterygota.	
Ranunculus eoreptans	Nom. nov	Valid	Doweld	Pliocene		Belarus	A species of Ranunculus; a replacement name for Ranunculus pusillus Dorofeev (1987).	
Retiacolpites pigafettaensis	Sp. nov	Valid	Prasad et al.	Late Cretaceous (Maastrichtian)		India	A pollen taxon resembling pollen of members of the genus Pigafetta.	
Reyispermum	Gen. et sp. nov	Valid	Friis, Crane & Pedersen	Early Cretaceous	Figueira da Foz Formation	Portugal	A flowering plant with affinities to Austrobaileyales or Nymphaeales. Genus includes new species R. parvum.	
Rhododendron maii	Nom. nov	Valid	Doweld	Pliocene		Germany	A species of Rhododendron; a replacement name for Rhododendron germanicum Mai & Walther (1988).	
Rightcania	Gen. et sp. nov	Valid	Friis, Crane & Pedersen	Early Cretaceous (Albian)	Potomac Group	United States (Virginia)	A member of the family Chloranthaceae. Genus includes new species R. kvacekii.	
Ripogonum palaeozeylandiae	Sp. nov	Valid	Conran, Kennedy & Bannister	Early Eocene		New Zealand	A species of Ripogonum.	
Ruprechtioxylon breae	Sp. nov	Valid	Franco	Late Cenozoic	Ituzaingó Formation	Argentina	A member of Polygonaceae described on the basis of fossil wood.	
Ryparosa churiaensis	Sp. nov	Valid	Prasad et al.	Miocene	Churia Formation	Nepal	A species of Ryparosa.	
Salacia lombardii	Sp. nov	Valid	Hernández-Damián, Gómez-Acevedo & Cevallos-Ferriz	Miocene		Mexico	A species of Salacia.	
Sambucus sarmatiaca	Sp. nov	Valid	Doweld	Miocene		Russia (Rostov Oblast)	A species of Sambucus; a replacement name for the invalidly named Sambucus palaeoracemosa Baikovskaja in Kryshtofovich & Baikovskaja (1965).	
Sapindopsis retallackii	Sp. nov	Valid	Wang & Dilcher	Early Cretaceous (Albian)	Dakota Formation	United States (Kansas)	A member or a relative of the family Platanaceae described on the basis of fossil leaves.	
Schoenoplectiella isolepioides	Sp. nov	Valid	Doweld	Pliocene		Germany	A member of the family Cyperaceae; a replacement name for the invalidly named Scirpus (Schoenoplectus) isolepioides Mai & Walther (1988).	
Scirpus novorossicus	Nom. nov	Valid	Doweld	Miocene (Tortonian)		Ukraine	A species of Scirpus; a replacement name for Scirpus leptocarpus Negru (1986), preoccupied by extant Scirpus leptocarpus Mueller (1855).	
Setitheca	Gen. et sp. nov	Valid	Poinar & Chambers	Late Cretaceous (Cenomanian)	Burmese amber	Myanmar	A member of Laurales of uncertain phylogenetic placement. Genus includes new species S. lativalva.	
Silutanispermum	Gen. et sp. nov	Valid	Friis, Crane & Pedersen	Early Cretaceous		Portugal	A flowering plant with affinities to Austrobaileyales or Nymphaeales. Genus includes new species S. kvacekiorum.	
Sloanea siwalika	Sp. nov	Valid	More et al.	Pliocene	Geabdat Sandstone Formation	India	A species of Sloanea.	
Soepadmoa	Gen. et sp. nov	Valid	Nixon, Crepet, Gandolfo & Grimaldi	Late Cretaceous (Turonian)	Raritan Formation (New Jersey amber)	United States (New Jersey)	A member of Fagales of uncertain phylogenetic placement. Genus includes new species S. cupulata.	
Staphylea spinosa	Sp. nov	Valid	Huang & Momohara in Huang, Momohara & Wang	Pleistocene	Shobudani Formation	Japan	A species of Staphylea.	
Stafylioxylon	Gen. et comb. nov	Valid	Rozefelds & Pace	Eocene	London Clay	United Kingdom	A member of Vitaceae; a new genus for "Vitaceoxylon" ramunculiformis Poole & Wilkinson (2000).	
Stellatia	Gen. et comb. nov	Valid	Arai & Dias-Brito	Late Cretaceous (Santonian)	São Carlos Formation	Brazil	A phytoclast, possibly a member of Nymphaeaceae. Genus includes S. furcata (Duarte & Arai, 2010).	
Stephania auriformis	Comb nov	valid	(Hollick) Manchester & Han	Paleocene/Eocene	"King Salmon Lake flora"	USA; Alaska	A moonseed species. Moved from Diploclisia auriformis (1994)	
Stephania jacquesii	Sp. nov	Valid	Han & Manchester in Han et al.	Late Eocene to late Oligocene	Clarno Formation; Yongning Formation	China; United States (Oregon)	A species of Stephania.	
Stephania psittaca	Sp. nov	Valid	Jud & Gandolfo in Jud et al.	Paleocene (Danian)	Salamanca Formation	Argentina	A species of Stephania.	
Stephania wilfii	Sp. nov	Valid	Han & Manchester in Han et al.	Paleocene to Eocene	Green River Formation	United States (Wyoming)	A species of Stephania.	
Sterculia acerina	Nom. nov	Valid	Doweld	Eocene		Czech Republic	A species of Sterculia; a replacement name for Acer crassinervium Ettingshausen (1869).	
Symplocos hitchcockii	Sp. nov	Valid	Tiffney, Manchester & Fritsch	Early Miocene	Brandon Lignite	United States (Vermont)	A species of Symplocos.	
Syzygium christophelii	Sp. nov	Valid	Tarran et al.	Early Miocene		Australia	A species of Syzygium.	
Syzygium gurhaensis	Sp. nov	Valid	Shukla, Mehrotra & Nawaz Ali	Early Eocene	Palana Formation	India	A species of Syzygium.	
Tanispermum	Gen. et 4 sp. nov	Valid	Friis, Crane & Pedersen	Early Cretaceous (early Aptian to early to middle Albian)	Potomac Group	United States (Maryland; Virginia)	A flowering plant with affinities to Austrobaileyales or Nymphaeales. Genus includes new species T. hopewellense, T. marylandense, T. drewriense and T. antiquum.	
Teuschestanthes	Gen. et sp. nov	Valid	Crepet, Nixon & Weeks	Late Cretaceous (Turonian)	Lower Magothy Formation	United States (New Jersey)	A member of Ericales of uncertain phylogenetic placement. Genus includes new species T. squamata.	
Trichomites	Gen. et 3 sp. nov	Valid	Arai & Dias-Brito	Late Cretaceous (Santonian)	São Carlos Formation	Brazil	A phytoclast. Genus includes new species T. brevifurcatus (probably a member of Campanulaceae), T. duplihelicoidus (affinity unknown) and T. simplex (a dicotyledon of uncertain affinity).	
Tricolpites joelcastroi	Sp. nov	Valid	Arai & Dias-Brito	Late Cretaceous (Santonian)	São Carlos Formation	Brazil	A pollen taxon, an indeterminate dicotyledon.	
Trochodendroides sittensis	Sp. nov	Valid	Golovneva in Golovneva & Zolina	Early Cretaceous		Russia	Taxon described on the basis of fossil leaves resembling leaves of members of the family Cercidiphyllaceae.	
Trochodendron postnastae	Sp. nov	Valid	Manchester, Pigg & Devore	Middle Miocene	Little Butte Volcanic Series	United States (Oregon)	A species of Trochodendron.	
Trochodendron rosayi	Sp. nov	Valid	Manchester, Pigg & Devore	Middle Miocene	Little Butte Volcanic Series	United States (Idaho; Oregon)	A species of Trochodendron.	
Turneroxylon	Gen. et sp. nov	Valid	Estrada-Ruiz et al.	Late Cretaceous (late Campanian)	McRae Formation	United States (New Mexico)	A eudicot with similarities to members of Dilleniaceae, described on the basis of fossil wood. Genus includes new species T. newmexicoense.	
Ulmus maguanensis	Sp. nov	Valid	Zhang & Xing in Zhang et al.	Miocene	Huazhige Formation	China	An elm.	
Ulmus prelanceaefolia	Sp. nov	Valid	Zhang & Xing in Zhang et al.	Miocene	Huazhige Formation	China	An elm.	
Ulmus priamurica	Sp. nov	Valid	Blokhina & Bondarenko	Miocene	Sazanka Formation	Russia (Amur Oblast)	An elm.	
Unona miocenica	Sp. nov	Valid	Prasad et al.	Miocene	Churia Formation	Nepal	A member of the family Annonaceae.	
Viburnum pliolantana	Nom. nov	Valid	Doweld	Pliocene		Russia (Bashkortostan)	A species of Viburnum; a replacement name for Viburnum lantanoides Dorofeev (1977).	
Weinmannioxylon trichospermoides	Sp. nov	Valid	Pujana in Pujana et al.	Late Cretaceous (Campanian)	Santa Marta Formation	Antarctica (James Ross Island)	A member of Cunoniaceae described on the basis of fossil wood.	
Wilkinsoniphyllum	Gen. et sp. nov	Valid	Jud et al.	Paleocene (Danian)	Salamanca Formation	Argentina	A member of the family Menispermaceae described on the basis of fossil leaves. Genus includes new species W. menispermoides.	
Wingia	Gen. et comb. nov	Valid	Wang & Dilcher	Early Cretaceous (Albian)	Dakota Formation	United States (Kansas; Nebraska)	A flowering plant of uncertain phylogenetic placement, described on the basis of fossil leaves. Genus includes "Dicotylophyllum" expansolobum Upchurch & Dilcher (1990).	
Zanthoxylum pilari	Nom. nov	Valid	Doweld	Miocene		Croatia	A species of Zanthoxylum; a replacement name for Zanthoxylum affine Pilar (1883).	
Zanthoxylum tethyca	Nom. nov	Valid	Doweld	Eocene		United Kingdom	A species of Zanthoxylum; a replacement name for Rutaspermum rugosum Chandler (1964).	
Zelkovoxylon yesimae	Sp. nov	Valid	Akkemik & Poole in Akkemik et al.	Early Miocene	Haymana Basin	Turkey	A Zelkova-like plant described on the basis of fossil wood.	
Zygogynum poratus	Sp. nov	Valid	Liang & Zhou in Liang et al.	Middle Miocene		China	A species of Zygogynum.	

== Pinales ==
Name	Novelty	Status	Authors	Age	Unit	Location	Notes	Images
Agathis immortalis	Sp. nov	Valid	Escapa et al.	Paleocene (Danian)		Argentina	A species of Agathis.	
Agathoxylon crasseradiatum	Sp. nov	Valid	Lignier ex Philippe et al.	Early Cretaceous (late Aptian-Albian)		France	A member of Araucariaceae described on the basis of fossil wood.	
Agathoxylon holbavicum	Sp. nov	Valid	Iamandei, Iamandei & Grădinaru	Early Jurassic		Romania		
Agathoxylon santacruzense	Sp. nov	Valid	Kloster & Gnaedinger	Middle Jurassic	La Matilde Formation	Argentina		
Araucaria lefipanensis	Sp. nov	Valid	Andruchow-Colombo et al.	Late Cretaceous	Lefipán Formation	Argentina	A species of Araucaria.	
Atlanticoxylon ibiratinum	Sp. nov	Valid	Faria et al.	Permian (Artinskian)	Irati Formation	Brazil	A conifer described on the basis of fossil wood.	
Brachyoxylon cristianicum	Sp. nov	Valid	Iamandei, Iamandei & Grădinaru	Early Jurassic		Romania		
Brachyoxylon holbavicum	Sp. nov	Valid	Iamandei, Iamandei & Grădinaru	Early Jurassic		Romania		
Brachyoxylon zhejiangense	Sp. nov	Valid	Tian, Zhu & Wang in Tian et al.	Early Cretaceous	Guantou Formation	China	A coniferous wood.	
Chimaerostrobus	Gen. et sp. nov	Valid	Atkinson et al.	Early Jurassic(Pliensbachian-Toarcian)	Mawson Formation	Antarctica	A conifer pollen cone. Genus includes new species C. minutus.	
Cryptomeria yunnanensis	Sp. nov	Valid	Ding & Zhou in Ding et al.	Oligocene (Rupelian)	Lühe Basin	China	A member of Cupressaceae, a species of Cryptomeria.	
Cunninghamia shangcunica	Sp. nov	Valid	Kodrul et al.	Early Oligocene	Shangcun Formation	China	A species of Cunninghamia.	
Cyclusphaera annularis	Sp. nov	Valid	Perez Loinaze & Llorens	Early Cretaceous (Aptian)	Anfiteatro de Ticó Formation	Argentina	A pollen taxon with affinities with the family Araucariaceae.	
Cyclusphaera punnulosa	Sp. nov	Valid	Perez Loinaze & Llorens	Early Cretaceous (Aptian)	Anfiteatro de Ticó Formation	Argentina	A pollen taxon with affinities with the family Araucariaceae.	
Elatides laiyangensis	Sp. nov	Valid	Jin & Sun in Jin et al.	Early Cretaceous	Laiyang Formation	China	A conifer.	
Hirandubia	Gen. et sp. nov	Valid	Ghosh et al.	Early Cretaceous	Rajmahal Basin	India	A member of Cupressaceae. Genus includes new species H. cupressoides.	
Kirketapel salamanquensis	Sp. nov	Valid	Andruchow-Colombo et al.	Paleocene (Danian)	Salamanca Formation	Argentina	The oldest member of a scale-leaved clade of Podocarpaceae.	
Marskea heeriana	Sp. nov	Valid	Nosova & Kiritchkova	Middle Jurassic	Irkutsk Coal Basin	Russia		
Morinostrobus	Gen. et sp. nov	Valid	Stockey et al.	Early Cretaceous (Valanginian)		Canada (British Columbia)	A member of Cupressaceae described on the basis of pollen cones. Genus includes new species M. holbergensis.	
Pinus daflaensis	Nom. nov	Valid	Khan & Bera	Miocene	Dafla Formation	India	A pine; a replacement name for Pinus arunachalensis Khan & Bera (2017) (preoccupied by Pinus arunachalensis Srivastava, 2017).	
Pinus enochii	Sp. nov	Valid	Huerta Vergara & Cevallos-Ferriz	Late Cretaceous (late Campanian)	Lutita Packard Formation	Mexico	A pine.	
Pinus leiophylloides	Nom. nov	Valid	Doweld	Oligocene (Chattian)		France	A pine; a replacement name for Pinus pseudotaeda Saporta (1865).	
Pinus microstrobus	Nom. nov	Valid	Doweld	Oligocene (Chattian)		France	A pine; a replacement name for Pinus microcarpa Saporta (1865).	
Pinus notata	Nom. nov	Valid	Doweld	Oligocene (Chattian)		France	A pine; a replacement name for Pinus divaricata Saporta (1865).	
Pinus pentaphylloides	Nom. nov	Valid	Doweld	Late Cretaceous (Santonian)		Japan	A pine; a replacement name for Pinus hokkaidoensis Stockey & Ueda (1986).	
Pinus tetraphylloides	Nom. nov	Valid	Doweld	Oligocene (Chattian)		France	A pine; a replacement name for Pinus deflexa Saporta (1865).	
Pinus uxui	Sp. nov	Valid	Huerta Vergara & Cevallos-Ferriz	Late Cretaceous (late Campanian)	Lutita Packard Formation	Mexico	A pine.	
Platycladus preorientalis	Sp. nov	Valid	He et al.	Early Miocene		China	A species of Platycladus.	
Podocarpospermum podocarpoides	Sp. nov	Valid	Ghosh et al.	Early Cretaceous	Rajmahal Basin	India	A member of Podocarpaceae.	
Protocedroxylon zhalantunense	Sp. nov	Valid	Zhang, Tian & Wang in Zhang et al.	Middle Jurassic	Wanbao Formation	China	A member of the family Pinaceae.	
Protocedroxylon zhangii	Sp. nov	Valid	Zhang, Tian & Wang in Zhang et al.	Middle Jurassic	Wanbao Formation	China	A member of the family Pinaceae.	
Protophyllocladoxylon holbavicum	Sp. nov	Valid	Iamandei, Iamandei & Grădinaru	Early Jurassic		Romania		
Pseudofrenelopsis salesii	Sp. nov	Valid	Batista et al.	Early Cretaceous (Albian)	Romualdo Member	Brazil	A member of Cheirolepidiaceae.	
Rabagostrobus	Gen. et sp. nov	Valid	Kvaček et al.	Early Cretaceous (Albian)		Spain	An araucarian pollen cone. Genus includes new species R. hispanicus.	
Sequoioxylon carneyvillense	Sp. nov	Valid	Li, Jin & Manchester	Paleocene	Fort Union Formation	United States (Wyoming)	Fossil wood resembling Sequoia.	
Sequoioxylon zhangii	Sp. nov	Valid	Tian et al.	Late Cretaceous		China	A member of Sequoioideae described on the basis of fossil wood.	
Taxocladus czeremchoviensis	Sp. nov	Valid	Frolov & Mashchuk	Early Jurassic	Czeremkhovskaya Formation	Russia	Possibly a member of the family Taxaceae.	
Yanliaoa daohugouensis	Sp. nov	Valid	Tan et al.	Middle Jurassic	Daohugou Beds	China	A member of Cupressaceae sensu lato.	

== Other seed plants ==
Name	Novelty	Status	Authors	Age	Unit	Location	Notes	Images
Baiera telmensis	Sp. nov	Valid	Frolov in Frolov & Mashchuk	Early Jurassic	Prisayanskaya Formation	Russia	A member of Ginkgoales.	
Calycosperma	Gen. et sp. nov	Valid	Liu et al.	Late Devonian	Wutong Formation	China	An early seed plant. Genus includes new species C. qii.	
Carpolithes kurminensis	Sp. nov	Valid	Frolov in Frolov & Mashchuk	Middle Jurassic	Taltsy Formation	Russia	Seed of a gymnosperm of uncertain affinities.	
Cordaites daviessensis	Sp. nov	Valid	Šimůnek	Carboniferous (early Westphalian D)	Staunton Formation	United States (Indiana)		
Cordaites kinneyensis	Sp. nov	Valid	Šimůnek	Carboniferous (Stephanian B)	Atrasado Formation	United States (New Mexico)		
Cordaites minshallensis	Sp. nov	Valid	Šimůnek	Carboniferous (Bolsovian)	Brazil Formation	United States (Indiana)		
Cordaites olneyensis	Sp. nov	Valid	Šimůnek	Carboniferous (late Pennsylvanian)	Mattoon Formation	United States (Illinois)		
Cycadolepis ferrugineus	Sp. nov	Valid	McLoughlin, Pott & Sobbe	Jurassic (Pliensbachian–Aalenian)		Australia	A member of Bennettitales belonging to the family Williamsoniaceae.	
Cycadopites grossus	Sp. nov	Valid	Perez Loinaze & Llorens	Early Cretaceous (Aptian)	Anfiteatro de Ticó Formation	Argentina	A pollen taxon, similar to many of the modern cycad pollen types.	
Czekanowskia ottenii	Sp. nov	Valid	Kiritchkova, Kostina & Nosova	Jurassic		Russia		
Eamesia	Gen. et sp. nov	Valid	Yang et al.	Early Cretaceous (Aptian)	Yixian Formation	China	A member of Ephedraceae. Genus includes new species E. chinensis.	
Eretmophyllum neimengguensis	Sp. nov	Valid	Li et al.	Middle Jurassic	Yan'an Formation	China	A member of Ginkgoales.	
Eretmophyllum odintsovae	Sp. nov	Valid	Frolov & Mashchuk	Middle Jurassic	Taltsy Formation	Russia	A member of Ginkgoales.	
Eretmophyllum olchaense	Sp. nov	Valid	Kiritchkova, Kostina & Nosova	Jurassic		Russia		
Ginkgo cuneifolia	Sp. nov	Valid	Tan, Dilcher, Wang & Sun in Sun et al.	Middle Jurassic	Jiulongshan Formation	China	A species of Ginkgo.	
Ginkgo daohugouensis	Sp. nov	Valid	Tan, Dilcher, Wang & Sun in Sun et al.	Middle Jurassic	Jiulongshan Formation	China	A species of Ginkgo.	
Ginkgo glinkiensis	Sp. nov	Valid	Frolov & Mashchuk	Early Jurassic	Czeremkhovskaya Formation	Russia	Originally described as a species of Ginkgo, but subsequently transferred to the genus Ginkgoites.	
Ginkgo parvifolia	Sp. nov	Valid	Tan, Dilcher, Wang & Sun in Sun et al.	Middle Jurassic	Jiulongshan Formation	China	A species of Ginkgo.	
Ginkgophyllum rhipidomorphum	Sp. nov	Valid	Gomankov	Late Permian		Russia		
Hexianthus	Gen. et sp. nov	Valid	Wang & Sun in Wang et al.	Early Permian	Taiyuan Formation	China	A cone fossil belonging to the group Cordaitopsida and the family Cordaitaceae. Genus includes new species H. shenii.	
Jugasporites vellicoites	Sp. nov	Valid	Zavattieri, Gutiérrez & Ezpeleta	Permian (Lopingian)	La Veteada Formation	Argentina	A member of Voltziales described on the basis of fossil pollen grains.	
Nanjinganthus	Gen. et sp. nov	Valid	Fu et al.	Early Jurassic	South Xiangshan Formation	China	A seed plant of uncertain phylogenetic placement. Interpreted as an early fossil flower by Fu et al. (2018); Coiro, Doyle & Hilton (2019) considered known specimens of this plant to be more similar to conifer cones. Genus includes new species N. dendrostyla.	
Nilssoniopteris crassiaxis	Sp. nov	Valid	Zhao & Deng in Zhao et al.	Middle Jurassic	Xishanyao Formation	China	A member of Bennettitales.	
Nilssoniopteris hamiensis	Sp. nov	Valid	Zhao & Deng in Zhao et al.	Middle Jurassic	Xishanyao Formation	China	A member of Bennettitales.	
Nilssoniopteris neimenguensis	Nom. nov	Valid	Zhao & Deng in Zhao et al.	Early and Middle Jurassic	Hongqi Formation; Mentougou Formation	China	A member of Bennettitales; a replacement name for Nilssoniopteris angustifolia Wang (1984), preoccupied by Nilssoniopteris angustifolia Doludenko and Svanidze (1969).	
Nilssoniopteris shiveeovoensis	Sp. nov	Valid	Herrera et al.	Early Cretaceous (Aptian–Albian)	Khukhteeg Formation	Mongolia	A member of Bennettitales.	
Nilssoniopteris tomentosa	Sp. nov	Valid	Herrera et al.	Early Cretaceous (Aptian–Albian)	Tevshiingovi Formation	Mongolia	A member of Bennettitales.	
Otozamites toshioensoi	Sp. nov	Valid	Yamada, Legrand & Nishida	Early Cretaceous (Albian)	Sawada Formation	Japan		
Ovalocarpus	Gen. et sp. nov	Valid	Naugolnykh	Early Permian		Russia	A member of Ginkgoales belonging to the family Cheirocladaceae. Genus includes new species O. ovoides.	
Pachytestopsis	Gen. et sp. nov	Valid	McLoughlin, Bomfleur & Drinnan	Permian (Changhsingian)	Fort Cooper Coal Measures	Australia	A member of Glossopteridales. Genus includes new species P. tayloriorum.	
Phoenicopsis kurminensis	Sp. nov	Valid	Frolov in Frolov & Mashchuk	Middle Jurassic	Irkutsk Basin	Russia	A member of Leptostrobales (= Czekanowskiales).	
Podozamites harrisii	Sp. nov	Valid	Shi et al.	Early Cretaceous (Aptian–Albian)	Tevshiin Govi Formation	Mongolia	A conifer belonging to the family Podozamitaceae, described on the basis of leaves.	
Pseudotorellia kiensis	Sp. nov	Valid	Nosova & Golovneva	Late Cretaceous		Russia	A member of Ginkgoales, described on the basis of leaves.	
Pseudotorellia palustris	Sp. nov	Valid	Shi et al.	Early Cretaceous (Aptian–Albian)	Tevshiin Govi Formation	Mongolia	A member of Ginkgoales, described on the basis of leaves.	
Pseudotorellia parvifolia	Sp. nov	Valid	Nosova & Golovneva	Early Cretaceous		Russia	A member of Ginkgoales, described on the basis of leaves.	
Pseudotorellia resinosa	Sp. nov	Valid	Shi et al.	Early Cretaceous (Aptian–Albian)	Tevshiin Govi Formation	Mongolia	A member of Ginkgoales, described on the basis of leaves.	
Pterophyllum philippoviae	Sp. nov	Valid	Gnilovskaya & Golovneva	Late Cretaceous (Turonian–Coniacian)		Russia (Magadan Oblast)	A member of Bennettitales.	
Pterophyllum terechoviae	Sp. nov	Valid	Gnilovskaya & Golovneva	Late Cretaceous (Maastrichtian)	Kakanaut Formation	Russia (Koryak Okrug)	A member of Bennettitales.	
Ptilozamites longifolia	Sp. nov	Valid	Cariglino, Monti & Zavattieri	Middle Triassic	Quebrada de los Fósiles Formation	Argentina	A seed fern.	
Rufloria glabra	Sp. nov	Valid	Gomankov	Permian		Russia	A member of Pinopsida belonging to the group Cordaitanthales and to the family Rufloriaceae.	
Samaropsis shenii	Sp. nov	Valid	Wang & Sun in Wang et al.	Early Permian	Taiyuan Formation	China	A seed fossil belonging to the group Cordaitopsida and the family Cordaitaceae.	
Solenites haojiagouensis	Sp. nov	Valid	Yang et al.	Late Triassic	Haojiagou Formation	China	A member of Czekanowskiales.	
Sphenopteris valentinii	Sp. nov	Valid	Forte & Kerp in Forte et al.	Permian (Kungurian)	Tregiovo Formation	Italy	A fern-like plant, probably a seed fern.	
Trisquama	Gen. et sp. nov	Valid	Gordenko & Broushkin	Middle Jurassic (Bathonian)		Russia (Kursk Oblast)	A gymnosperm of uncertain phylogenetic placement, belonging to the new order Trisquamales. Genus includes new species T. valentinii.	
Williamsonia durikaiensis	Sp. nov	Valid	McLoughlin, Pott & Sobbe	Jurassic (Pliensbachian–Aalenian)		Australia	A member of Bennettitales belonging to the family Williamsoniaceae.	
Williamsonia eskensis	Sp. nov	Valid	McLoughlin, Pott & Sobbe	Middle Triassic	Esk Formation	Australia	A member of Bennettitales belonging to the family Williamsoniaceae.	
Williamsonia gracilis	Sp. nov	Valid	McLoughlin, Pott & Sobbe	Early Cretaceous (Berriasian–Hauterivian)	Lees Sandstone	Australia	A member of Bennettitales belonging to the family Williamsoniaceae.	
Williamsonia ipsvicensis	Sp. nov	Valid	McLoughlin, Pott & Sobbe	Late Triassic (Carnian or earliest Norian)	Blackstone Formation	Australia	A member of Bennettitales belonging to the family Williamsoniaceae.	
Williamsonia rugosa	Sp. nov	Valid	McLoughlin, Pott & Sobbe	Middle Jurassic (Aalenian–Bajocian)		Australia	A member of Bennettitales belonging to the family Williamsoniaceae.	
Wintucycas beatrizae	Sp. nov	Valid	Martínez, Ottone & Artabe	Paleocene	Pichaihue Limestone	Argentina	A cycad belonging to the group Encephalartoideae.	
Zamia nelliae	Sp. nov	Valid	Erdei & Calonje in Erdei et al.	Late Eocene	Gatuncillo Formation	Panama	A cycad, a species of Zamia.	

== Other plants ==
Name	Novelty	Status	Authors	Age	Unit	Location	Notes	Images
Acitheca murphyi	Sp. nov	Valid	Correia et al.	Carboniferous (Gzhelian)	Douro Basin	Portugal	A marattialean fern.	
Adoketophyton pingyipuensis	Sp. nov	Valid	Edwards & Li	Early Devonian	Pingyipu Group	China		
Apiculatasporites ruptus	Sp. nov	Valid	Noetinger, di Pasquo & Starck	Devonian		Argentina	A trilete spore.	
Aptychellites	Gen. et sp. nov	Valid	Schäfer-Verwimp, Hedenäs, Ignatov & Heinrichs in Kaasalainen et al.	Miocene	Dominican amber	Dominican Republic	A moss resembling members of the extant genus Aptychella of the family Pylaisiadelphaceae. Genus includes new species A. fossilis.	
Arthropitys taoshuyuanensis	Sp. nov	Valid	Chen et al.	Permian (Wuchiapingian)	Wutonggou Formation	China	A member of Calamitaceae.	
Asinisetum plaatkopensis	Sp. nov	Valid	Anderson & Anderson	Late Triassic (Carnian)	Molteno Formation	South Africa	A member of Equisetopsida belonging to the group Equisetales and the family Equisetaceae.	
Azolla coloniensis	Sp. nov	Valid	De Benedetti et al.	Late Cretaceous		Argentina	A species of Azolla.	
Balenosetum	Gen. et sp. nov	Valid	Anderson & Anderson	Late Triassic (Carnian)	Molteno Formation	South Africa	A member of Equisetopsida belonging to the group Echinostachyales. Genus includes new species B. candlewaxia.	
Baoyinia	Gen. et sp. nov	Valid	Edwards & Li	Early Devonian	Pingyipu Group	China	A zosterophyll. Genus includes new species B. sichuanensis.	
Calamospora fissurata	Sp. nov	Valid	Gutiérrez & Balarino	Carboniferous (Pennsylvanian)	Ordóñez Formation	Argentina	A spore taxon.	
Cetistachys	Gen. et sp. nov	Valid	Anderson & Anderson	Late Triassic (Carnian)	Molteno Formation	South Africa	A member of Equisetopsida belonging to the group Echinostachyales. Genus includes new species C. cetenis.	
Cheilolejeunea lamyi	Sp. nov	Valid	Heinrichs et al.	Miocene	Dominican amber	Dominican Republic	A member of Lejeuneaceae.	
Cladophlebis akulovii	Sp. nov	Valid	Frolov in Frolov & Mashchuk	Middle Jurassic	Taltsy Formation	Russia	A fern of uncertain affinities.	
Cladophlebis odintsovае	Sp. nov	Valid	Frolov & Mashchuk	Middle Jurassic	Prisayanskaya Formation	Russia	A fern of uncertain affinities.	
Cooksonia barrandei	Sp. nov	Valid	Libertín et al.	Early Silurian	Motol Formation	Czech Republic		
Coptospora santacrucensis	Sp. nov	Valid	Perez Loinaze & Llorens	Early Cretaceous (Aptian)	Anfiteatro de Ticó Formation	Argentina	A spore taxon similar to spores of extant members of the families Sphaerocarpaceae, Ricciaceae and Riellaceae.	
Crybelosporites corrugatus	Sp. nov	Valid	Perez Loinaze & Llorens	Early Cretaceous (Aptian)	Anfiteatro de Ticó Formation	Argentina	A spore taxon related to the family Marsileaceae.	
Culcita remberi	Sp. nov	Valid	Pinson, Manchester & Sessa	Miocene	Clarkia fossil beds	United States (Idaho)	A species of Culcita.	
Cymatiosphaera robusta	Sp. nov	Valid	Noetinger, di Pasquo & Starck	Devonian		Argentina	A prasinophyte.	
Densoisporites patagonicus	Sp. nov	Valid	Perez Loinaze & Llorens	Early Cretaceous (Aptian)	Anfiteatro de Ticó Formation	Argentina	A spore taxon with affinities with the Lycopsida.	
Dictyophyllum menendezii	Sp. nov	Valid	Bodnar et al.	Middle Triassic (Ladinian)	Cortaderita Formation	Argentina	A fern belonging to the family Dipteridaceae.	
Digitopteris	Gen. et sp. nov	Valid	Pott & Bomfleur in Pott et al.	Late Triassic (Carnian)		Austria	A fern belonging to the family Dipteridaceae. Genus includes new species D. repanda.	
Echinostachys tinensis	Sp. nov	Valid	Anderson & Anderson	Late Triassic (Carnian)	Molteno Formation	South Africa	A member of Equisetopsida belonging to the group Echinostachyales and the family Echinostachyaceae.	
Eddianna	Gen. et sp. nov	Valid	Pfeiler & Tomescu	Devonian (Emsian)	Battery Point Formation	Canada (Quebec)	A member of Rhyniopsida. Genus includes new species E. gaspiana	
Electorotheca	Gen. et sp. nov	Valid	Morris, Edwards & Pedersen	Devonian (Lochkovian)	Freshwater West Formation	United Kingdom	A plant of uncertain phylogenetic placement. Genus includes new species E. enigmatica.	
Emphanisporites genselae	Sp. nov	Valid	Wellman	Devonian (Pragian-earliest Emsian)	Val d'Amour Formation	Canada (New Brunswick)	A plant described on the basis of fossil spores.	
Emphanisporites morrisae	Sp. nov	Valid	Wellman	Devonian (Pragian-earliest Emsian)	Campbellton Formation; Val d'Amour Formation	Canada (New Brunswick)	A plant described on the basis of fossil spores.	
Emphanisporites? tenuis	Sp. nov	Valid	García Muro, Rubinstein & Steemans	Silurian (Přídolí)	Los Espejos Formation	Argentina	A plant described on the basis of fossil spores.	
Endosporites menendezi	Nom. nov	Valid	Gutiérrez & Balarino	Carboniferous (Pennsylvanian)	Agua Colorada Formation	Argentina	A spore taxon; a replacement name for Endosporites parvus Menéndez (1965).	
Equisetites budagaevae	Sp. nov	Valid	Frolov in Frolov & Mashchuk	Middle Jurassic	Prisayanskaya Formation	Russia	A member of Equisetopsida belonging to the group Equisetales and the family Equisetaceae.	
Equisetites greenensis	Sp. nov	Valid	Anderson & Anderson	Late Triassic (Carnian)	Molteno Formation	South Africa	A member of Equisetopsida belonging to the group Equisetales and the family Equisetaceae.	
Equisetites kanensis	Sp. nov	Valid	Anderson & Anderson	Late Triassic (Carnian)	Molteno Formation	South Africa	A member of Equisetopsida belonging to the group Equisetales and the family Equisetaceae.	
Equisetites kapokensis	Sp. nov	Valid	Anderson & Anderson	Late Triassic (Carnian)	Molteno Formation	South Africa	A member of Equisetopsida belonging to the group Equisetales and the family Equisetaceae.	
Equisetites nuwensis	Sp. nov	Valid	Anderson & Anderson	Late Triassic (Carnian)	Molteno Formation	South Africa	A member of Equisetopsida belonging to the group Equisetales and the family Equisetaceae.	
Equisetites pentapenensis	Sp. nov	Valid	Anderson & Anderson	Late Triassic (Carnian)	Molteno Formation	South Africa	A member of Equisetopsida belonging to the group Equisetales and the family Equisetaceae.	
Equisetites umkensis	Sp. nov	Valid	Anderson & Anderson	Late Triassic (Carnian)	Molteno Formation	South Africa	A member of Equisetopsida belonging to the group Equisetales and the family Equisetaceae.	
Equisetostachys boesmansensis	Sp. nov	Valid	Anderson & Anderson	Late Triassic (Carnian)	Molteno Formation	South Africa	A member of Equisetopsida belonging to the group Equisetales and the family Equisetaceae.	
Equisetostachys calensis	Sp. nov	Valid	Anderson & Anderson	Late Triassic (Carnian)	Molteno Formation	South Africa	A member of Equisetopsida belonging to the group Equisetales and the family Equisetaceae.	
Equisetostachys cervensis	Sp. nov	Valid	Anderson & Anderson	Late Triassic (Carnian)	Molteno Formation	South Africa	A member of Equisetopsida belonging to the group Equisetales and the family Equisetaceae.	
Equisetostachys jaarensis	Sp. nov	Valid	Anderson & Anderson	Late Triassic (Carnian)	Molteno Formation	South Africa	A member of Equisetopsida belonging to the group Equisetales and the family Equisetaceae.	
Equisetostachys kroonensis	Sp. nov	Valid	Anderson & Anderson	Late Triassic (Carnian)	Molteno Formation	South Africa	A member of Equisetopsida belonging to the group Equisetales and the family Equisetaceae.	
Equisetostachys laggensis	Sp. nov	Valid	Anderson & Anderson	Late Triassic (Carnian)	Molteno Formation	South Africa	A member of Equisetopsida belonging to the group Equisetales and the family Equisetaceae.	
Equisetostachys luziensis	Sp. nov	Valid	Anderson & Anderson	Late Triassic (Carnian)	Molteno Formation	South Africa	A member of Equisetopsida belonging to the group Equisetales and the family Equisetaceae.	
Equisetostachys penensis	Sp. nov	Valid	Anderson & Anderson	Late Triassic (Carnian)	Molteno Formation	South Africa	A member of Equisetopsida belonging to the group Equisetales and the family Equisetaceae.	
Equisetostachys pokensis	Sp. nov	Valid	Anderson & Anderson	Late Triassic (Carnian)	Molteno Formation	South Africa	A member of Equisetopsida belonging to the group Equisetales and the family Equisetaceae.	
Escapia	Gen. et sp. nov	Valid	Rothwell, Millay & Stockey	Early Cretaceous		Canada (British Columbia)	A member of Marattiales. Genus includes new species E. christensenioides.	
Frederica kurdistanensis	Sp. nov	Valid	Bucur et al.	Paleogene	Khurmala Formation	Iraq	A green alga belonging to the group Dasycladales.	
Frullania grabenhorstii	Sp. nov	Valid	Feldberg et al.	Eocene	Bitterfeld amber	Germany	A liverwort, a species of Frullania.	
Frullania zerovii	Sp. nov	Valid	Mamontov, Ignatov & Perkovsky	Eocene	Rovno amber	Ukraine	A liverwort, a species of Frullania.	
Geocalyx heinrichsii	Sp. nov	Valid	Katagiri	Eocene	Baltic amber	Europe (Baltic Sea region)	A liverwort.	
Gleicheniorachis sinensis	Sp. nov	Valid	Tian et al.	Late Jurassic	Manketouebo Formation	China	A fern belonging to the family Gleicheniaceae.	
Groenlandia pescheri	Sp. nov	Valid	Uhl & Poschmann	Oligocene (Chattian)	Enspel Formation	Germany	A species of Groenlandia.	
Heilongjiangcaulis	Gen. et sp. nov	Valid	Cheng & Yang	Cretaceous	Songliao Basin	China	A tree fern. Genus includes new species H. keshanensis.	
Holttumopteris	Gen. et sp. nov	Valid	Regalado et al.	Cretaceous (Albian–Cenomanian )	Burmese amber	Myanmar	A eupolypod fern. Genus includes new species H. burmensis.	
Horriditriletes chacoparanensis	Sp. nov	Valid	Gutiérrez & Balarino	Carboniferous (Pennsylvanian)	Ordóñez Formation	Argentina	A spore taxon.	
Hypnites lycopodioides	Nom. nov	Valid	Ignatov & Váňa in Winterscheid et al.	Late Oligocene	Rott Formation	Germany	A member of Hypnales of uncertain phylogenetic placement; a replacement name for Hypnum lycopodioides Weber in Wessel & Weber.	
Jaffrezocodium	Gen. et sp. nov	Valid	Granier	Cretaceous (Albian-Cenomanian)		France; Spain	A green alga belonging to the group Bryopsidales. Genus includes new species J. bipennatus.	
Jiangyounia	Gen. et sp. nov	Valid	Edwards & Li	Early Devonian	Pingyipu Group	China	A rhyniophyte. Genus includes new species J. gengi.	
Knorripteris taylorii	Sp. nov	Valid	Galtier et al.	Triassic		Germany	A pteridophyte of uncertain phylogenetic placement.	
Kowieria	Gen. et sp. nov	Valid	Gess & Prestianni	Devonian (Famennian)	Witpoort Formation	South Africa	A lycopsid. Genus includes new species K. alveoformis.	
Kraaiostachys	Gen. et sp. nov	Valid	Anderson & Anderson	Late Triassic (Carnian)	Molteno Formation; Santa Clara Formation	Mexico; South Africa	A member of Equisetopsida belonging to the group Equisetales and the family Equisetaceae. Genus includes new species K. plaatkopensis.	
Leiosphaeridia ibateensis	Sp. nov	Valid	Arai & Dias-Brito	Late Cretaceous (Santonian)	São Carlos Formation	Brazil	An acritarch, probably a prasinophyte.	
Leiotriletes malanzanensis	Nom. nov	Valid	Gutiérrez & Balarino	Carboniferous (Pennsylvanian)	Malanzán Formation	Argentina	A spore taxon; a replacement name for Leiotriletes tenuis Azcuy (1975).	
Lejeunea miocenica	Sp. nov	Valid	Heinrichs, Schäfer-Verwimp, Renner & Lee in Kaasalainen et al.	Miocene	Dominican amber	Dominican Republic	A liverwort, a species of Lejeunea.	
Lilingostrobus	Gen. et sp. nov	Valid	Gerrienne et al.	Devonian (Famennian)	Xikuangshan Formation	China	A member of Lycopsida of uncertain phylogenetic placement. Genus includes new species L. chaloneri.	
Marsilea mascogos	Sp. nov	Valid	Estrada-Ruiz et al.	Late Cretaceous (late Campanian)	Olmos Formation	Mexico	A species of Marsilea.	
Molaspora aspera	Sp. nov	Valid	Zavialova & Batten	Late Cretaceous (Cenomanian)		France	A member of Marsileaceae described on the basis of megaspores.	
Moltenomites	Gen. et 2 sp. nov	Valid	Anderson & Anderson	Late Triassic (Carnian)	Molteno Formation	South Africa	A member of Equisetopsida belonging to the group Echinostachyales. Genus includes new species M. linearifolia and M. attenuatifolia.	
Naybandoporella	Gen. et sp. et comb. nov	Valid	Senowbari-Daryan	Late Triassic (Rhaetian)	Nayband Formation	Greece; Iran	A green alga belonging to the group Dasycladales, possibly a member of the family Triploporellaceae. Genus includes new species N. rhaetica, as well as "Probolocupsis" sarmeikensis Senowbari-Daryan (2014).	
Oleandra bangmaii	Sp. nov	Valid	Xie et al.	Late Miocene		China	A species of Oleandra.	
Ornicephalum	Gen. et comb. nov	Valid	Edwards & Li	Early Devonian	Pingyipu Group	China	A member of Lycophytina; a new genus for "Zosterophyllum" sichuanensis Geng (1992).	
?Osmunda weylandii	Sp. nov	Valid	Kvaček & Winterscheid in Winterscheid et al.	Late Oligocene	Rott Formation	Germany	A fern, possibly a species of Osmunda.	
Osmundopsis zunigai	Sp. nov	Valid	Coturel et al.	Late Triassic (Carnian)	Potrerillos Formation	Argentina	A fern belonging to the family Osmundaceae.	
Paraschizoneura fredensis	Sp. nov	Valid	Anderson & Anderson	Late Triassic (Carnian)	Molteno Formation	South Africa	A member of Equisetopsida belonging to the group Echinostachyales and the family Echinostachyaceae.	
Paraschizoneura quadripenensis	Sp. nov	Valid	Anderson & Anderson	Late Triassic (Carnian)	Molteno Formation	South Africa	A member of Equisetopsida belonging to the group Echinostachyales and the family Echinostachyaceae.	
Paraschizoneura rooipoortensis	Sp. nov	Valid	Anderson & Anderson	Late Triassic (Carnian)	Molteno Formation	South Africa	A member of Equisetopsida belonging to the group Echinostachyales and the family Echinostachyaceae.	
Paraschizoneura telensis	Sp. nov	Valid	Anderson & Anderson	Late Triassic (Carnian)	Molteno Formation	South Africa	A member of Equisetopsida belonging to the group Echinostachyales and the family Echinostachyaceae.	
Peromonolites globosum	Sp. nov	Valid	Perez Loinaze & Llorens	Early Cretaceous (Aptian)	Anfiteatro de Ticó Formation	Argentina	A spore taxon with affinities with the Filicales.	
Pleurorhizoxylon	Gen. et sp. nov	Valid	Zhang et al.	Late Devonian		China	An early euphyllophyte. Genus includes new species P. yixingense.	
Polycladophyton	Gen. et sp. nov	Valid	Edwards & Li	Early Devonian	Pingyipu Group	China	A rhyniophyte. Genus includes new species P. gracilis.	
Pterospermella simplex	Sp. nov	Valid	Noetinger, di Pasquo & Starck	Devonian		Argentina	A prasinophyte.	
Radula intecta	Sp. nov	Valid	Renner, Schäfer-Verwimp & Heinrichs in Kaasalainen et al.	Miocene	Dominican amber	Dominican Republic	A species of Radula	
Rafaherbstia	Ge. et sp. nov	Valid	Vera & Césari	Early Cretaceous (Aptian)	Cerro Negro Formation	Antarctica (Livingston Island)	A cyathealean tree fern. Genus includes new species R. nishidai.	
Retitriletes ornatus	Sp. nov	Valid	Perez Loinaze & Llorens	Early Cretaceous (Aptian)	Anfiteatro de Ticó Formation	Argentina	A spore taxon with affinities with the Lycopodiales.	
Retusotriletes archangelskyi	Sp. nov	Valid	Gutiérrez & Balarino	Carboniferous (Pennsylvanian)	Ordóñez Formation	Argentina	A spore taxon.	
Schizoneura cucumis	Sp. nov	Valid	Anderson & Anderson	Late Triassic (Carnian)	Molteno Formation	South Africa	A member of Equisetopsida belonging to the group Echinostachyales and the family Echinostachyaceae.	
Schizoneura koningensis	Sp. nov	Valid	Anderson & Anderson	Late Triassic (Carnian)	Molteno Formation	South Africa	A member of Equisetopsida belonging to the group Echinostachyales and the family Echinostachyaceae.	
Scleropteris iljiniana	Sp. nov	Valid	Kiritchkova, Kostina & Nosova	Jurassic		Russia		
Sichuania	Gen. et sp. nov	Valid	Edwards & Li	Early Devonian	Pingyipu Group	China	A zosterophyll. Genus includes new species S. uskielloides.	
Sphenophyllum changxingense	Sp. nov	Valid	Huang et al.	Late Devonian	Wutong Formation	China		
Suppiluliumaella tarburensis	Sp. nov	Valid	Rashidi & Schlagintweit	Late Cretaceous (Maastrichtian)	Tarbur Formation	Iran	A green alga belonging to the group Dasycladales.	
Tauridium elongatum	Sp. nov	Valid	Jia & Song	Late Permian	Changxing Formation	China	A member of Gymnocodiaceae.	
Taurocusporites inaequalis	Sp. nov	Valid	Perez Loinaze & Llorens	Early Cretaceous (Aptian)	Anfiteatro de Ticó Formation	Argentina	A spore taxon with affinities with the Bryophyta sensu lato.	
Tempskya zhangii	Sp. nov	Valid	Xiaonan, Fengxiang & Yeming	Cretaceous		China	A tree fern	
Tiaomaphyton	Gen. et sp. nov	Valid	Xu, Fu & Wang	Middle Devonian	Tiaomachian Formation	China	A Colpodexylon-like lycopsid. Genus includes new species T. fui.	
Townroviamites multifoliata	Sp. nov	Valid	Anderson & Anderson	Late Triassic (Carnian)	Molteno Formation	South Africa	A member of Equisetopsida belonging to the group Equisetales and the family Equisetaceae.	
Townroviamites petfredae	Sp. nov	Valid	Anderson & Anderson	Late Triassic (Carnian)	Molteno Formation	South Africa	A member of Equisetopsida belonging to the group Equisetales and the family Equisetaceae.	
Townroviamites stellata	Sp. nov	Valid	Anderson & Anderson	Late Triassic (Carnian)	Molteno Formation	South Africa	A member of Equisetopsida belonging to the group Equisetales and the family Equisetaceae.	
Tricarinella	Gen. et sp. nov	Valid	Savoretti et al.	Early Cretaceous (Valanginian)		Canada (British Columbia)	A moss belonging to the family Grimmiaceae. Genus includes new species T. crassiphylla.	
Viridistachys	Gen. et 2 sp. nov	Valid	Anderson & Anderson	Late Triassic (Carnian)	Molteno Formation	South Africa	A member of Equisetopsida belonging to the group Equisetales and the family Equisetaceae. Genus includes new species V. moltenensis and V. gypsensis.	
Zonulamites annumensis	Sp. nov	Valid	Anderson & Anderson	Late Triassic (Carnian)	Molteno Formation	South Africa	A member of Equisetopsida belonging to the group Equisetales and the family Equisetaceae.	
Zonulamites collensis	Sp. nov	Valid	Anderson & Anderson	Late Triassic (Carnian)	Molteno Formation	South Africa	A member of Equisetopsida belonging to the group Equisetales and the family Equisetaceae.	
Zonulamites elandensis	Sp. nov	Valid	Anderson & Anderson	Late Triassic (Carnian)	Molteno Formation	South Africa	A member of Equisetopsida belonging to the group Equisetales and the family Equisetaceae.	
Zonulamites viridensis	Sp. nov	Valid	Anderson & Anderson	Late Triassic (Carnian)	Molteno Formation	South Africa	A member of Equisetopsida belonging to the group Equisetales and the family Equisetaceae.	
Zosterophyllum ovatum	Sp. nov	Valid	Edwards & Li	Early Devonian	Pingyipu Group	China		

== General research ==
- A study attempting to establish a timescale of early land plant evolution is published by Morris et al. (2018).
- Assemblage of putative Ordovician (Hirnantian) land plants is described from the Zbrza locality in the southern Świętokrzyskie Mountains (Poland) by Salamon et al. (2018).
- A study on the structure and variation of areolation patterns in leaves of Paleozoic protosphagnalean mosses is published by Ivanov, Maslova & Ignatov (2018).
- A study on the phylogenetic relationships of the Cretaceous mosses Meantoinea alophosioides and Eopolytrichum antiquum within Polytrichaceae is published by Bippus, Escapa & Tomescu (2018).
- Meristems of rooting axes belonging to Asteroxylon mackiei are described from the Rhynie chert (United Kingdom) by Hetherington & Dolan (2018).
- A study re-examining the evidence on the speed of growth and life cycle of the tree-like lycophytes from the Carboniferous (Pennsylvanian) coal swamps, and in particular addressing an earlier study by Boyce & DiMichele (2016), is published by Thomas & Cleal (2018).
- A study on the impact of increased ultraviolet irradation (caused by volcanism-induced ozone shield deterioration) on plants during the Permian–Triassic extinction event is published by Benca, Duijnstee & Looy (2018).
- A study on the composition of the Late Triassic flora of the American Southwest, based on palynological data from the Chinle Formation, and indicative of a floral turnover occurring in the middle Norian, is published by Baranyi et al. (2018).
- A study on the Middle Jurassic flora from Yorkshire (United Kingdom) as indicated by pollen and spores, and on the possible dinosaur-plant interactions in the area is published by Slater et al. (2018).
- Occurrence of the characean genus Tolypella is reported from the Lower Cretaceous of the Garraf Massif (Catalonia, Spain) by Martín-Closas et al. (2018), representing the oldest known record of the genus reported so far.
- A study on the spore wall structure and development in Psilophyton dawsonii is published by Noetinger, Strayer & Tomescu (2018).
- Lycopsid megaspores preserved with fossil starch, probably used to attract and reward animals for megaspore dispersal, are described from the Permian of north China by Liu et al. (2018).
- A study on the phylogenetic relationships of extant and fossil members of Equisetales is published by Elgorriaga et al. (2018).
- A study on the anatomy of the Devonian fern-like plant Shougangia bella is published by Wang et al. (2018).
- A study on the phylogenetic relationships of a putative Triassic fern Pekinopteris, based on evaluation of specimens preserving fertile pinnae, is published by Axsmith, Skog & Pott (2018).
- A study on the anatomical structure of Coniopteris hymenophylloides (a fossil fern belonging to the family Dicksoniaceae) based on well-preserved materials from the Middle Jurassic Yaojie Formation (China), including sterile and fertile pinnae, sporangia and in situ spores, epidermal cuticles and stomatal complexes, is published by Xin et al. (2018).
- A study on the phylogenetic relationships of extant and fossil marattialean ferns is published by Rothwell, Millay & Stockey (2018).
- A study on the phylogenetic relationships of members of Dipteridaceae based on data from extant and fossil taxa is published by Choo & Escapa (2018).
- A study on the phylogenetic relationships of early seed plants, aneurophytalean progymnosperms, Stenokoleales and several Devonian plants of uncertain affinities is published by Toledo, Bippus & Tomescu (2018).
- Plant fossils representing the genera Glossopteris, Vertebraria, Samaropsis, Paracalamites, Sphenophyllum and Dichotomopteris are described from the Permian strata in the Tabbowa Basin of Sri Lanka by Edirisooriya, Dharmagunawardhane & McLoughlin (2018), thus being the first representatives of the distinctive Permian Glossopteris flora reported from that country.
- Fossils of member of the genus Glossopteris related to the species Glossopteris communis from India are described from the Permian deposits of southeastern Gobi (Mongolia) by Naugolnykh & Uranbileg (2018).
- A study on the fossils of glossopterids from the Permian (Lopingian) Buckley Formation (Antarctica) will be published by DeWitt et al. (2018), who present evidence of glossopterids shedding their pollen organs during a different time of the season than Glossopteris leaves.
- Blomenkemper et al. (2018) report the discovery of mixed plant-fossil assemblages in Late Permian deposits on the margins of the Dead Sea in Jordan, including fossils of seed ferns, members of Bennettitales and the earliest records of conifers reported so far.
- A study on the phylogeny of conifers, comparing the inferred phylogenetic relationships and estimated divergence ages with the paleobotanical record, is published by Leslie et al. (2018).
- A study on the atmospheric carbon dioxide concentration levels in the Early Cretaceous based on data from specimens of the fossil conifer species Pseudofrenelopsis papillosa is published by Jing & Bainian (2018).
- A study on the phylogenetic relationships of members of Pinaceae based on data from extant and fossil taxa is published by Gernandt et al. (2018).
- A study on the epidermis of the leaves of the fossil pine Pinus mikii and on the phylogenetic relationships of the species is published by Yamada & Yamada (2018).
- A study on the anatomy and phylogenetic relationships of Austrohamia acanthobractea, based on data from leafy twigs with attached pollen cones and seed cones from the Middle Jurassic Daohugou Lagerstätte (China), is published by Dong et al. (2018).
- Rediscovery of the holotype specimen of Weltrichia fabrei is reported by Moreau & Thévenard (2018).
- Revision of gymnosperm species known from the Eocene Baltic amber is published by Alekseev (2018).
- A study on the phylogenetic relationships of the vascular plants and the timescale of their evolution, attempting to establish when the flowering plants originated, is published by Barba-Montoya et al. (2018).
- A study on the early evolution of Chloranthaceae, focusing on the phylogenetic relationships of the Cretaceous taxa Canrightiopsis and Pseudoasterophyllites, is published by Doyle & Endress (2018).
- Fossil assemblage including plant and vertebrate remains is described from the Turonian Ferron Sandstone Member of the Mancos Shale Formation (Utah, United States) by Jud et al. (2018), who report turtle and crocodilian remains and an ornithopod sacrum, as well as a large silicified log assigned to the genus Paraphyllanthoxylon, representing the largest known pre-Campanian flowering plant reported so far and the earliest documented occurrence of an angiosperm tree more than 1.0 m in diameter.
- A study on the phylogenetic relationships of extant and fossil members of Zingiberales is published by Smith et al. (2018).
- A study on the phylogenetic relationships of Cornales based on data from extant and fossil taxa is published by Atkinson (2018).
- A study on the microstructure of the fossils assigned to the genus Operculifructus, and on its implications for inferring the phylogenetic relationships of this genus, is published by Hayes et al. (2018).
- A study on the phylogenetic relationships of the flowering plants and Gnetales, as indicated by morphological data from extant and fossil taxa, is published by Coiro, Chomicki & Doyle (2018).
- Revision of the taxonomy of the Cretaceous monocot genus Viracarpon is published by Matsunaga et al. (2018), who transfer the species Coahuilocarpon phytolaccoides known from the Campanian Cerro del Pueblo Formation (Mexico) to the genus Viracarpon, thus rejecting the hypothesis that Viracarpon was endemic to India.
- Microfossil remains of early grasses extracted from a specimen of the Early Cretaceous dinosaur species Equijubus normani from China are described by Wu, You & Li (2018).
- Cantisolanum daturoides from the Eocene London Clay Formation, previously suggested to be a member of the family Solanaceae, is reinterpreted as more likely to be a commelinid monocot by Särkinen et al. (2018).
- A study on the lower threshold of extant palm temperature tolerance, as well as on the potential of using the presence of palm fossils to infer past climate, is published by Reichgelt, West & Greenwood (2018).
- A study on the human use of rainforest plant resources of prehistoric Sri Lanka, as indicated by data from phytoliths from the Fahien Rock Shelter sediments, is published by Premathilake & Hunt (2018).
- A study on the occurrence of bananas in the archaeological sequence at Fahien Rock Shelter (south-west Sri Lanka), as indicated by seed and leaf phytolith evidence, is published by Premathilake & Hunt (2018).
- A study on the macroevolutionary dynamics of extinction and adaptation of palms with megafaunal fruits in the late Cenozoic is published by Onstein et al. (2018), who interpret their findings as indicating that progressive loss of megafaunal frugivores during the late Cenozoic likely resulted in increased extinction rates of palms with megafaunal fruits.
- A study on the floral and fruit morphology of the early eudicot species Ranunculaecarpus quinquecarpellatus is published by Manchester et al. (2018).
- A study on the principal morphological characters distinguishing shade and sun leaves in modern species of Liquidambar, and on their implications for identifying leaf polymorphisms in fossil members of this genus that could otherwise be used to establish unwarranted new species, is published by Maslova et al. (2018).
- A study on fossil pollen of members of the group Ericales from five Eocene localities in the United Kingdom, Austria, Germany and China, aiming to describe fossil pollen types and compare them with the most similar looking pollen of modern species, is published by Hofmann (2018).
- A new fossil Loranthaceae pollen type (the first representative of this family in the fossil record of Africa) is described from the earliest Miocene of Saldanha Bay (South Africa) by Grímsson et al. (2018).
- A study on the types of fossil oak pollen grains from the Last Glacial Maximum sediments from the northern South China Sea, and on their implications for inferring regional climatic conditions in this area during the Last Glacial Maximum, is published by Dai, Hao & Mao (2018).
- A pistillate partial inflorescence of a member of the genus Castanopsis is described from Baltic amber by Sadowski, Hammel & Denk (2018), representing the first record of this genus from Baltic amber and the first pistillate inflorescence of Fagaceae from Eurasia reported so far.
- A study on factors which influenced the diversification processes and diversity dynamics of Cenozoic woody flowering plants is published by Shiono et al. (2018).
- Description of plant remains and palynomorphs preserved in the coprolites produced by large dicynodonts from the Triassic Chañares Formation (Argentina), and a study on the affinities of the plants preserved in those coprolites, is published by Perez Loinaze et al. (2018).
- A study on the nutritional value of plants grown under elevated CO_{2} levels, evaluating the hypothesis that constraints on sauropod diet quality were driven by Mesozoic CO_{2} concentration, is published by Gill et al. (2018).
- A study on the diversity, frequency and representation of insect damage of fossil plant specimens from the Permian La Golondrina Formation (Argentina) is published by Cariglino (2018).
- A study on the insect herbivory on fossil ginkgoalean and bennettitalean leaves from the Middle Jurassic Daohugou Beds (China), and on defenses of these plants against insect herbivory, is published by Na et al. (2018).
- Diverse gymnosperm and angiosperm fossils, displaying affinities with the flora of the Araripe Basin (Santana Formation) as well as those identified in deposits from the North America (Potomac Group), are described from the Lower Cretaceous Codó Formation (Brazil) by Lindoso et al. (2018).
- A study on the impact of the Cenomanian-Turonian boundary event on the continental flora, as indicated by spore-pollen fossil record, is published by Heimhofer et al. (2018).
- Insect and plant inclusions are reported from amber from the uppermost Campanian Kabaw Formation of Tilin (Myanmar) by Zheng et al. (2018).
- Grimaldi et al. (2018) report biological inclusions (fungi, plants, arachnids and insects) in amber from the Paleogene Chickaloon Formation of Alaska, representing the northernmost deposit of fossiliferous amber from the Cenozoic.
- Organically preserved plant fossils, including leaves with cuticular preservation, are described from the Paleogene Ligorio Márquez Formation (Argentina) by Carpenter, Iglesias & Wilf (2018).
- A study on changes in Eocene plant diversity and floristic composition at Messel (Germany) is published by Lenz & Wilde (2018).
- An amber layer is reported from the lower part of the Dingqing Formation (late Oligocene) in Lunpola of central Tibet (representing the first record of amber from Tibet) by Wang et al. (2018), who interpret this amber as derived from dipterocarp trees, and who interpret the amber layer as remains of the northernmost dipterocarp forest discovered so far.
- A study on CO_{2} concentrations during the early Miocene, as indicated by stomatal characteristics of fossil leaves from a late early Miocene assemblage from Panama and a leaf gas-exchange model, is published by Londoño et al. (2018).
- A study evaluating when the plants using the C_{4} photosynthetic pathway initially expanded on the Australian continent, as indicated by carbon isotope ratios of plant waxes from scientific ocean drilling sediments off north-western Australia, is published by Andrae et al. (2018).
- A study on the role of fire during the expansion of C_{4} grassland ecosystems in the Mio-Pliocene, based on data from molecular proxies from paleosol samples of the Siwalik Group (Pakistan), is published by Karp, Behrensmeyer & Freeman (2018).
- A study on the macroevolutionary responses of noctuid moths from the group Sesamiina and their associated host-grasses to environmental changes during the Neogene is published by Kergoat et al. (2018).
- A study on the abundance of the C_{3} and C_{4} grasses in the central interior of southern Africa in the Early Pleistocene, as indicated by enamel stable carbon and oxygen isotope data, associated faunal abundance and phytolith evidence from the site of Wonderwerk Cave (South Africa), is published by Ecker et al. (2018).
- A study on the changes of vegetation in the temperate zone of Asia during an interval containing the Mid-Pleistocene Transition, ~1.2–0.7 million years ago, as indicated by pollen data from a drilling core from the North China Plain, as well as on their effect on the large mammal fauna is published by Xinying et al. (2018).
- A study on the use of plants by early modern humans during the Middle Stone Age as indicated by analyses of phytoliths from the Pinnacle Point locality (South Africa) is published by Esteban et al. (2018).
- A study on the distance of seed dispersal by extant and extinct mammalian frugivores and on the impact of the extinction of Pleistocene megafauna on seed dispersal is published by Pires et al. (2018).
- A study evaluating how mega-herbivore animal species controlled plant community composition and nutrient cycling, relative to other factors during and after the Late Quaternary extinction event in Great Britain and Ireland, is published by Jeffers et al. (2018).
- A study on the seeds preserved in moa coprolites is published by Carpenter et al. (2018), who question the hypothesis that some of the largest-seeded plants of New Zealand were dispersed by moas.
- A study on the plant–insect interactions in the European forest plant communities in the Upper Pliocene Lagerstätte of Willershausen (Lower Saxony, Germany), the Upper Pliocene locality of Berga (Thuringia, Germany) and the Pleistocene locality of Bernasso (France) is published by Adroit et al. (2018).
- A study on pollen recovered from hyaena coprolites from Vanguard Cave (Gibraltar), and on its implications for reconstructing the vegetation landscapes in the environment inhabited by southern Iberian Neanderthals during the MIS 3, is published by Carrión et al. (2018).
- A study on the inner structure of cuticles and carbonaceous compressions of Early Jurassic plants from Argentinian Patagonia, using Focused Ion Beam Scanning Electron Microscopy, is published by Sender et al. (2018).
- A study on the changing ecology of woodland vegetation of southern mainland Greece during the late Pleistocene and the early-mid Holocene, and on the ecological context of the first introduction of crop domesticates in the southern Greek mainland, as indicated by data from carbonized fuel wood waste from the Franchthi Cave, is published by Asouti, Ntinou & Kabukcu (2018).
- Evidence of plant domestication and food production from the early and middle Holocene site of Teotonio (southwestern Amazonia, Brazil) is presented by Watling et al. (2018).
- A study on changes in plant pathogen communities (fungi and oomycetes) in response to changing climate during late Quaternary, as indicated by data from solidified deposits of rodent coprolites and nesting material from the central Atacama Desert spanning the last ca. 49,000 years, is published by Wood et al. (2018).
- A study on the timing of the origination of the East Asian flora (including Sino-Japanese Flora Metasequoia Flora and Sino-Himalayan Rhododendron Flora), as indicated by molecular and fossil data, is published by Chen et al. (2018).
