= Fossil wood =

Wood preserved in the fossil record

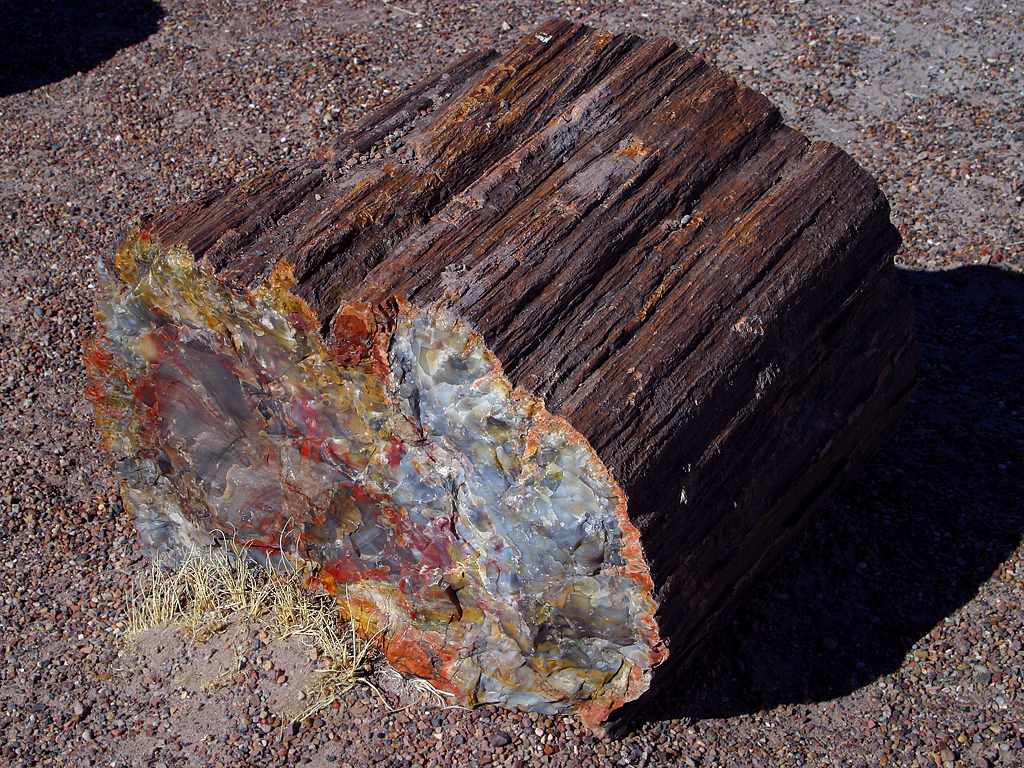
Petrified softwood

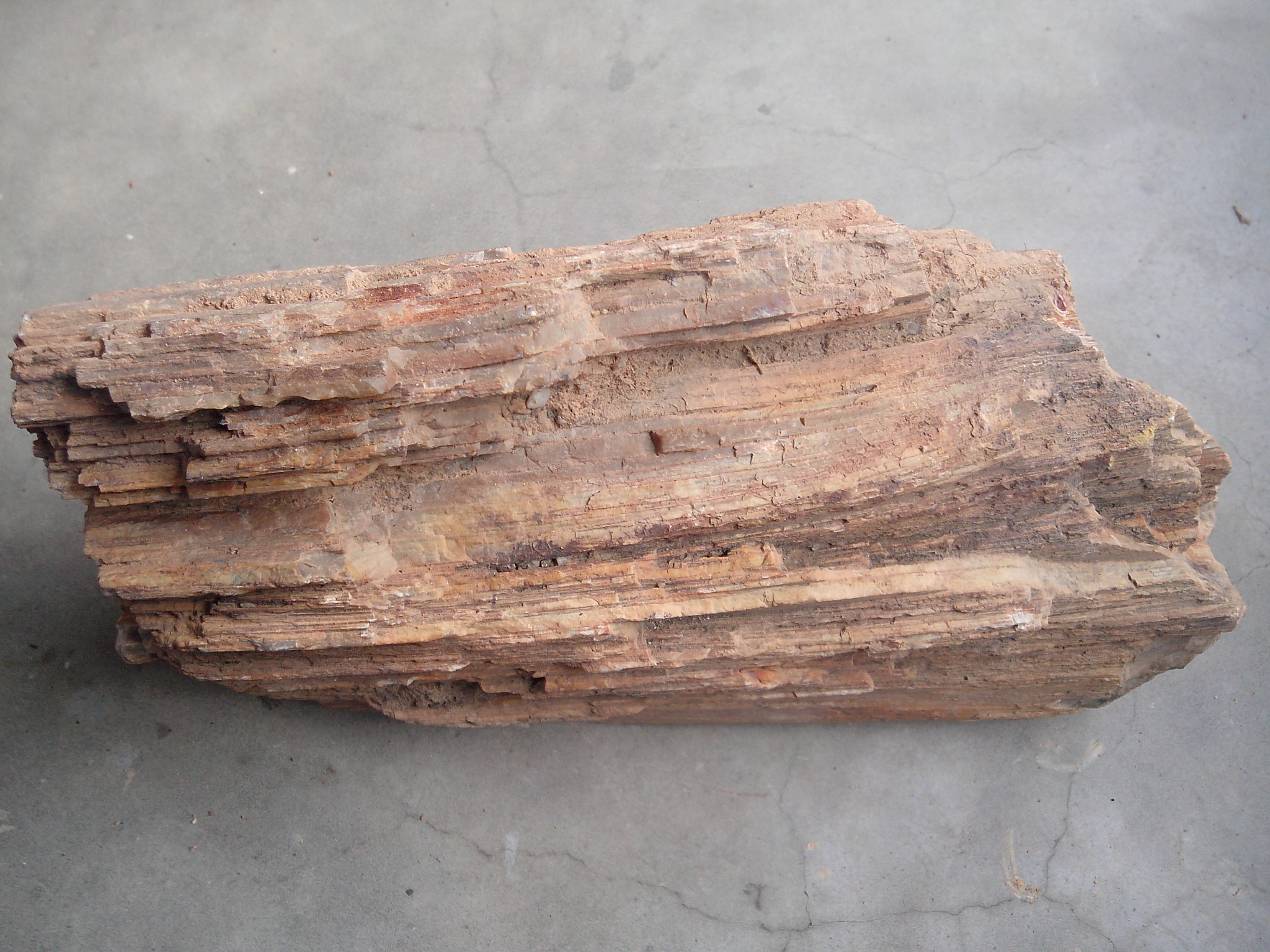
Fossil wood of Tamil Nadu

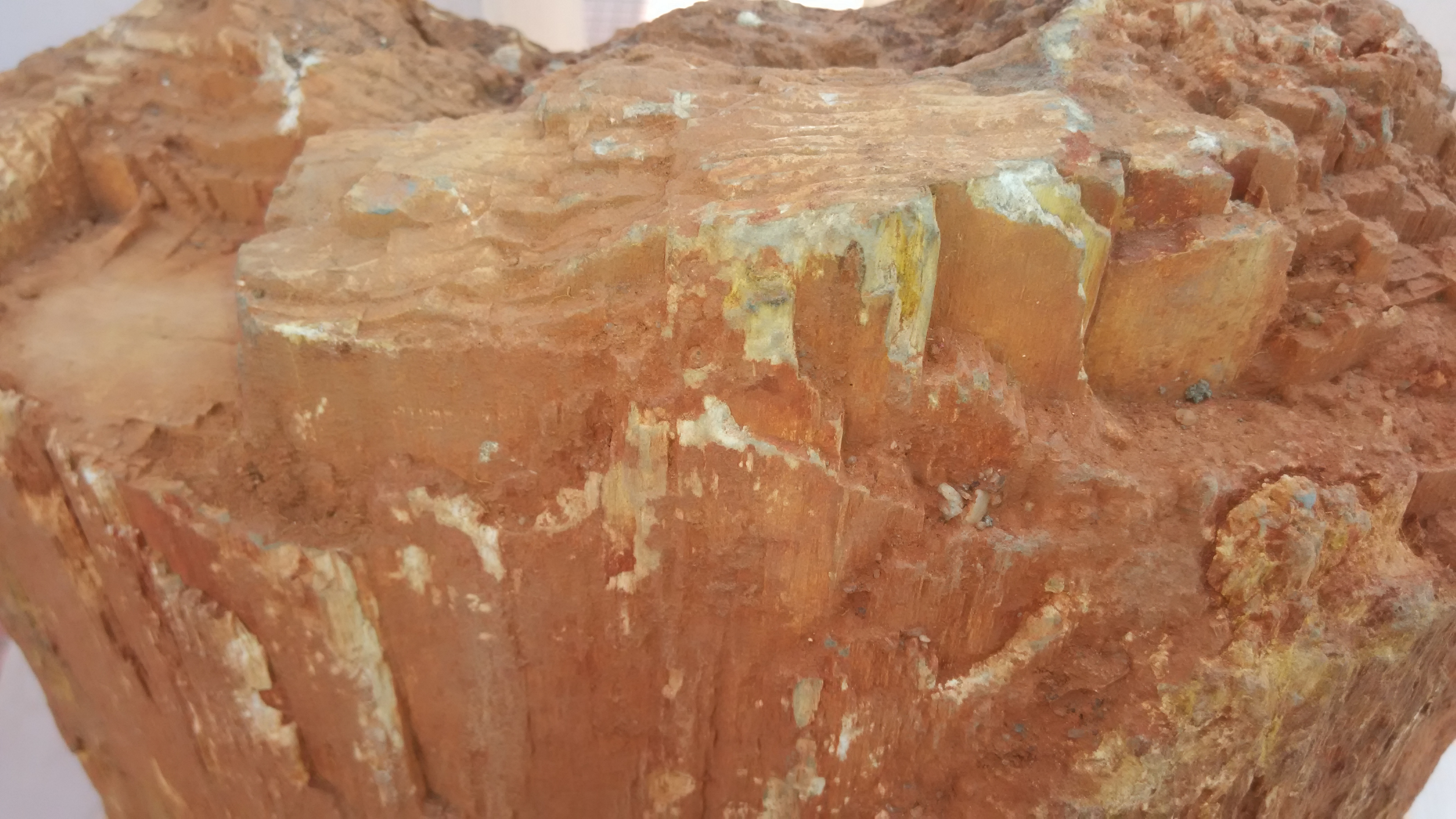
Fossil wood from the Pliocene in Thirvakkarai, Tamil Nadu

Fossil wood, also known as fossilized tree, is wood that is preserved in the fossil record. Over time the wood will usually be the part of a plant that is best preserved (and most easily found). Fossil wood may or may not be petrified, in which case it is known as petrified wood or petrified tree. The study of fossil wood is sometimes called palaeoxylology, and a palaeoxylologist is somebody who studies fossil wood.

The fossil wood may be the only part of the plant that has been preserved, with the rest of the plant completely unknown: therefore such wood may get a special kind of botanical name. This will usually include "xylon" and a term indicating its presumed (not necessarily certain) affinity, such as Araucarioxylon (wood similar to that of extant Araucaria or some related genus like Agathis or Wollemia), Palmoxylon (wood similar to that of modern Arecaeae), or Castanoxylon (wood similar to that of modern chinkapin or chestnut tree).

== Types ==
=== Petrified wood ===
Petrified wood are fossils of wood that have turned to stone through the process of permineralization. All organic materials are replaced with minerals while maintaining the original structure of the wood.

The most notable example is the petrified forest in Arizona.

=== Mummified wood ===
Mummified wood are fossils of wood that have not permineralized. They are formed when trees are buried rapidly in dry cold or hot environments. They are valued in paleobotany because they retain original cells and tissues capable of being examined with the same techniques used with extant plants in dendrology.

Notable examples include the mummified forests in Ellesmere Island and Axel Heiberg Island.

=== Submerged forests ===
Submerged forests are remains of trees submerged by marine transgression. They are important in determining sea level rise since the last glacial period.

== See also ==
- Amber
- Dendrochronology
- Jet (gemstone)
- Paleobotany
- Xyloid lignite
