= Stormberg Group =

Triassic/Jurassic geological group in the Karoo Supergroup in South Africa

- Stratigraphic range: Late Triassic-Early Jurassic; ~237–182 Ma
- Type: Geologic group
- Unit of: Karoo Supergroup
- Sub-units: Molteno, Elliot & Clarens Formations
- Underlies: Drakensberg Group
- Overlies: Beaufort Group
- Thickness: up to 4,593.176 feet (1,400 m)

Lithology
- Primary: Mudstone, claystone, siltstone
- Other: Sandstone, shale, tuff

Location
- Region: Eastern Cape, KwaZulu-Natal, Free State, Lesotho, Matabeleland, Central District, Karas, and Hardap
- Country: South Africa; Lesotho; Zimbabwe; Botswana
- Extent: Karoo Basin

Type section
- Named for: Stormberg Mountains
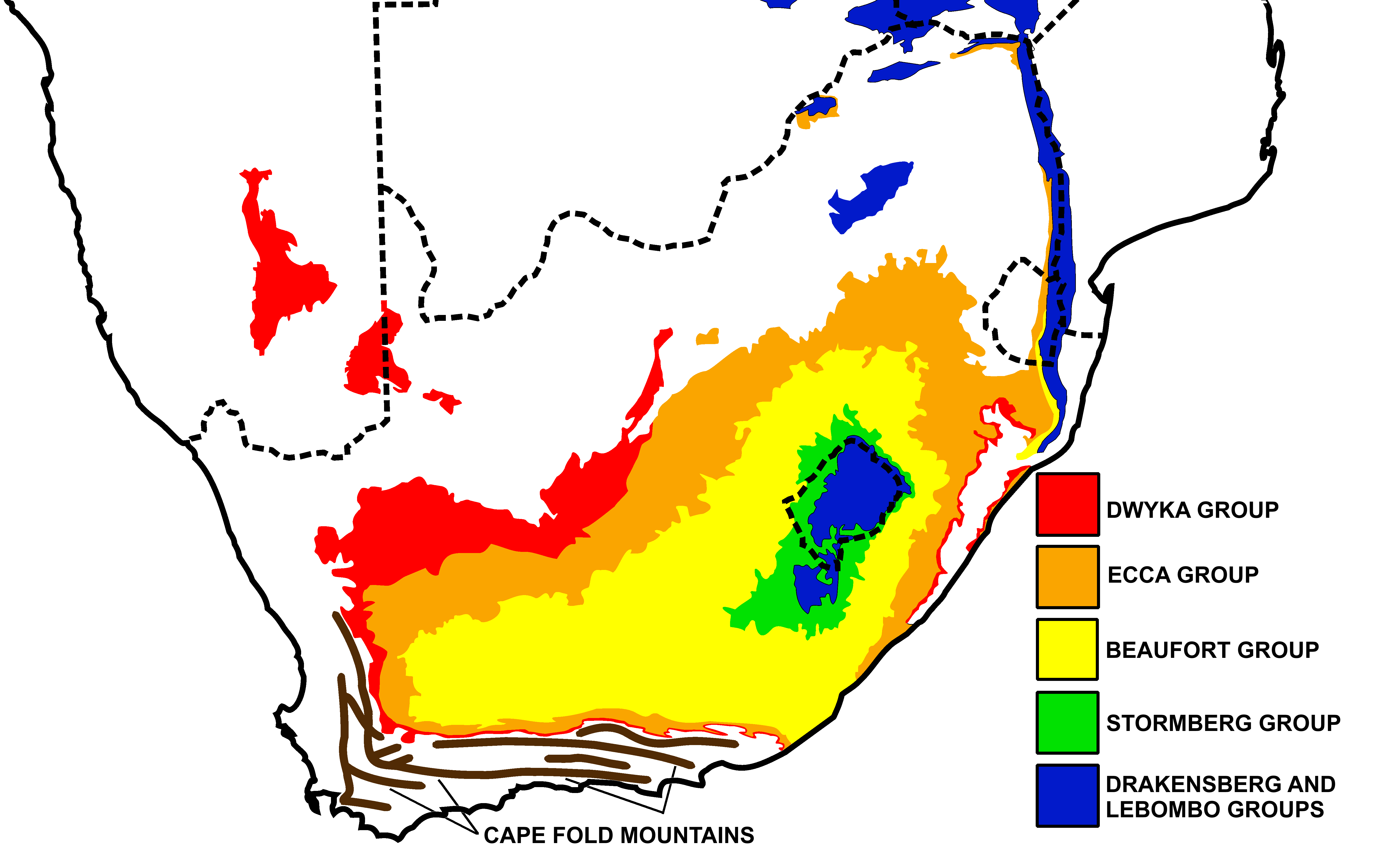
- Simplified geological map of the outcrops of Karoo Supergroup rocks in Southern Africa. The Stormberg Group is represented by the green key on the map.

The Stormberg Group is one of the four geological groups that comprises the Karoo Supergroup in South Africa. It is the uppermost geological group representing the final phase of preserved sedimentation of the Karoo Basin. The Stormberg Group rocks are considered to range between Lower Triassic (Olenekian) to Lower Jurassic (Pliensbachian) in age. These estimates are based on means of geological dating including stratigraphic position, lithostratigraphic and biostratigraphic correlations, and palynological analyses.

== Background ==
Sediment deposition of the Stormberg Group took place in a terrestrial environment that was seasonally arid. The depositional environment in the lower sections of the Stormberg was similar to that of the Katberg Formation. Both places feature coarser-grained sandstones that lack fining-upward sequences, thus pointing to an alluvial fan and braided river environment. The depositional environment changes towards the centre of the Stormberg as mudstones become more common, pointing to a change to fluvial-lacustrine deposits where sediments were deposited in low-energy fluvial settings. The upper Stormberg rocks changes back to being sandstone-rich. These sandstones represent preserved dune fields deposited by aeolian processes in a desert environment.

As the Stormberg Group is part of the Karoo Supergroup its associated rocks were deposited in a retroarc foreland basin. A fault-controlled crustal uplift (orogenesis) in the south influenced the foreland system at the beginning of the Stormberg deposition. This crustal uplift had been underway millions of years prior due to the subduction of the Paleo-pacific plate beneath the Gondwanan Plate, which had also resulted in the creation of the Gondwanide mountain range. At this time a divergent plate boundary was forming the Atlantic Ocean, southwest of Gondwana, heralding the earliest stages of the break-up of the Gondwanan supercontinent.

There are no outcrops or exposures of the Stormberg Group West of 24ºE. This was because orogenic loading in the south by the Gondwanide mountains from the early Triassic caused changes in position of the forebulge and foredeep in the foreland basin system. This resulted in the deposition zones shifting to the eastern and northeastern regions of the Karoo Basin from the Early Triassic until the Early Jurassic, when the Drakensberg Group volcanics commenced.

== Geographic extent ==
Outcrops and exposures of the Stormberg Group are found in several localities in Lesotho, and in the Free State, KwaZulu-Natal, and Eastern Cape provinces in South Africa.

== Subdivision ==
The Stormberg Group is composed of three main geological formations that are found in numerous localities across Lesotho and in the Free State, KwaZulu-Natal, and Eastern Cape provinces in South Africa. These formations are listed below (from oldest to youngest):

- Molteno Formation
- Elliot Formation
- Clarens Formation

== Paleontology ==
The Stormberg Group contains many fossils. It is also an important geological group as the Stormberg rocks are the only rocks in South Africa where dinosaur fossils have been discovered. In the lower sections diverse fossil plants are also found as well as preserved dinosaur trackways.

== Correlation ==
The Stormberg Group is correlated with several geological groups and formations in other parts of southern Africa. Some examples include the Tuli Basin in the northern parts of South Africa, Botswana, and Zimbabwe, and the Etjo Sandstone of Namibia. Abroad, rocks of the Stormberg Group correlate with the Chinle Formation of the Colorado Plateau in Utah, United States, the Santa Maria, Caturrita and Candelária Formations of the in the Triassic and Early Jurassic connected Paraná Basin in southeastern Brazil and the Triassic sequences of the Argentine Northwest; the Chañares, Los Rastros, Ischigualasto and Los Colorados Formations of the Ischigualasto-Villa Unión Basin, the Quebrada del Barro Formation of the Marayes-El Carrizal Basin and the Quebrada de los Fósiles and Río Seco de la Quebrada Formations of the San Rafael Block. In southernmost Gondwana, the group correlates with the Fremouw Formation of Antarctica.
