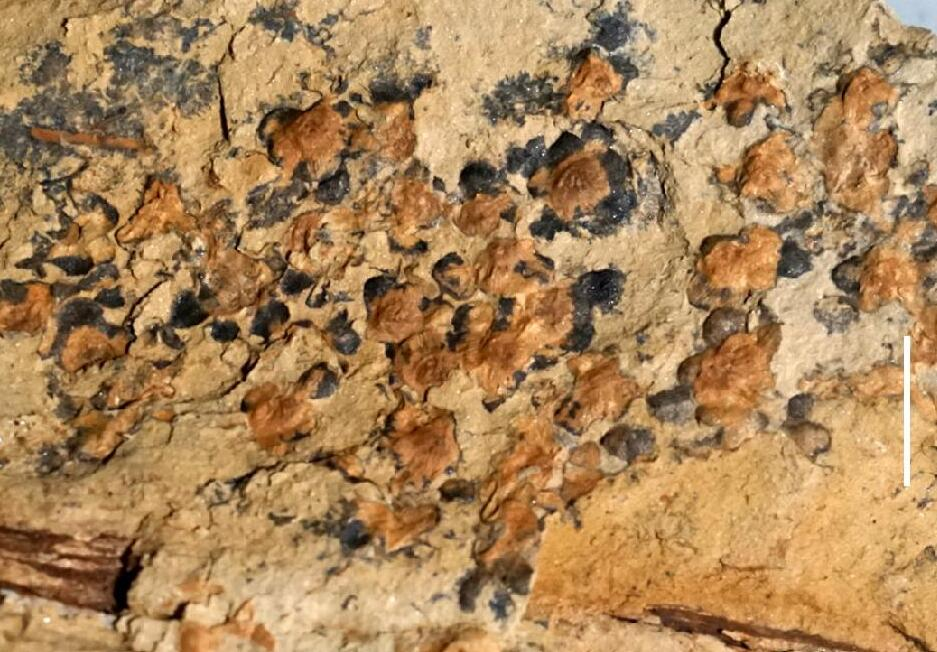
- Numerous compression fossils

Scientific classification
- Kingdom: Plantae
- Clade: Tracheophytes
- Clade: Spermatophytes
- Clade: Angiosperms (?)
- Genus: †Nanjinganthus; Fu et al., 2018
- Species: †N. dendrostyla

Binomial name
- †Nanjinganthus dendrostyla Fu et al., 2018

= Nanjinganthus =

Nanjinganthus Temporal range: Early Jurassic, 174 Ma

Extinct genus of plants

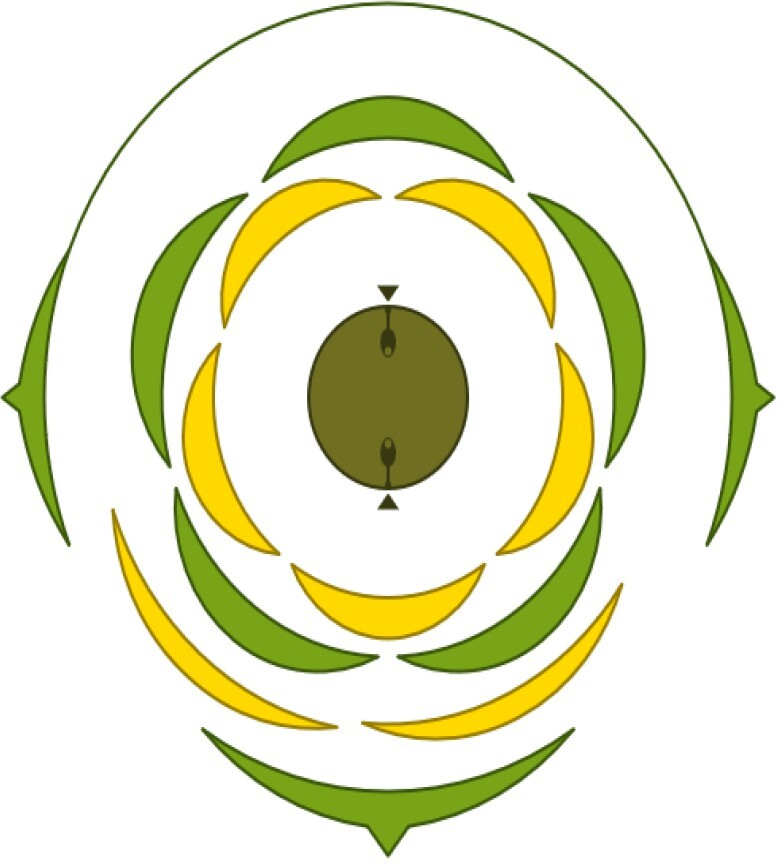
Conjectured floral diagram

Nanjinganthus dendrostyla is a fossil plant known from Early Jurassic sediments in China and proposed by Fu, et al. to represent a pre-Cretaceous angiosperm. The material consists of numerous compression fossils which bear a resemblance to flowers. The segments bear prominent ridges, suggesting veins, and a few specimens have a branched axis perpendicular to the segments, interpreted by Fu, et al. as a branched style. Beneath the putative perianth, Fu, et al. interpret the existence of ovules enclosed in ovaries, however, the preservation of this region of the structure is poor. If this fossil is an angiosperm, it would extend the first appearance of angiosperms by 50 million years.

The interpretation of Nanjinganthus as an angiosperm is disputed by Coiro, Doyle & Hilton (2019), who suggest the fossils are more consistent with a conifer, representing either fragmented pollen cones or axes which bore ovuliferous cone scales. Other authors have advanced similar criticisms, particularly disputing the interpretation of the pentamerous nature of the perianth and supporting the interpretation as a conifer cone.
