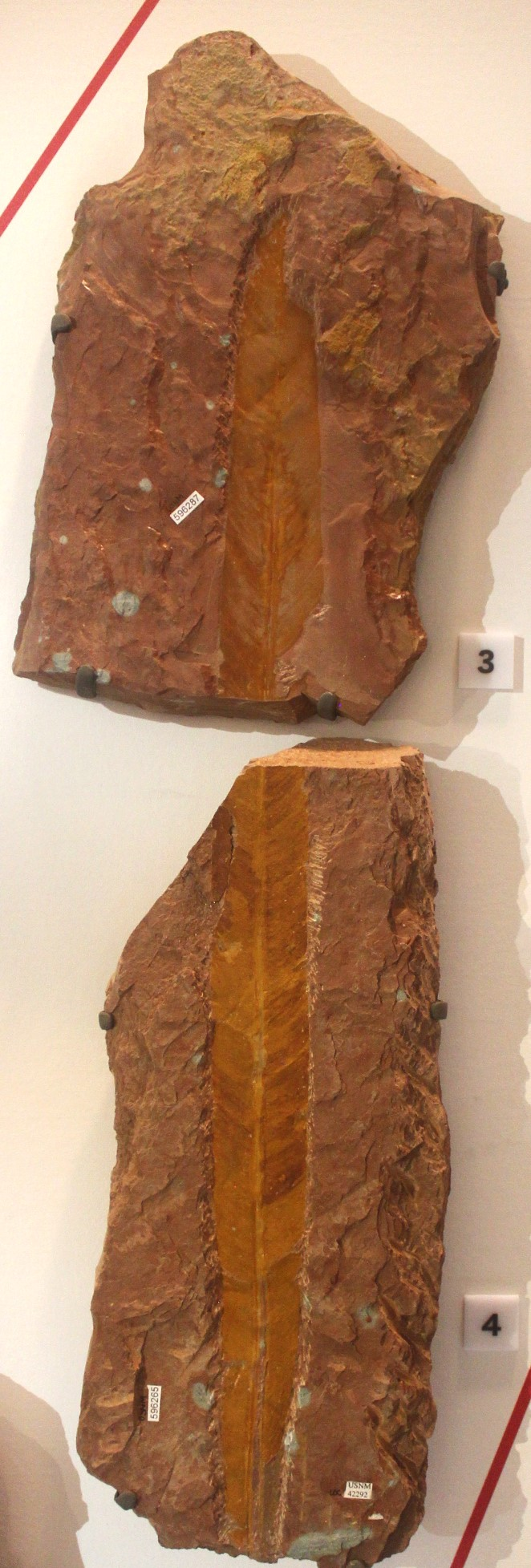
- Taeniopteris fossils (USNM 596265 and 596287), National Museum of Natural History

Scientific classification
- Kingdom: Plantae
- Clade: Tracheophytes
- Genus: †Taeniopteris; Brongniart, 1828

Species
- See text

= Taeniopteris =

Extinct genus of plants

Taeniopteris is an extinct form genus of Mesozoic vascular plant leaves, perhaps representing those of cycads, bennettitaleans, or marattialean ferns. The form genus is almost certainly a polyphyletic category for unfertile leaves of a certain shape ("taeniopterids") which cannot be assigned to specific groups due to a lack of information on cuticle or spore structures. The leaves are simple, with a strong central vein (rhachis) and an unbroken margin. The central vein leads to nearly perpendicular lateral veins, which may be slightly divided or undivided. The shape of the leaf is variable, but often elongated and smooth-edged. "Taeniopterid" leaves with bennettitalean-type cuticle are placed in the form genus Nilssoniopteris, while those with cycad-type cuticle are placed within Nilssonia and related genera. Some fertile "taeniopterids" preserve spore packages, and can be assigned to marattialean ferns.

Taeniopteris was named by Brongniart (1828) from an illustration of a Middle Jurassic leaf from Oxfordshire, as published by Sternberg (1823). This Oxfordshire specimen defined the type species, Taeniopteris vittata. The largest and broadest "taeniopterid" leaves are named as the form genus Macrotaeniopteris, which also represents cycad or bennettitalean leaves without preserved cuticle.
