= Molteno Formation =

Triassic geological formation in the Stormberg Group in Lesotho and South Africa

- Stratigraphic range: Carnian; ~237–228 Ma
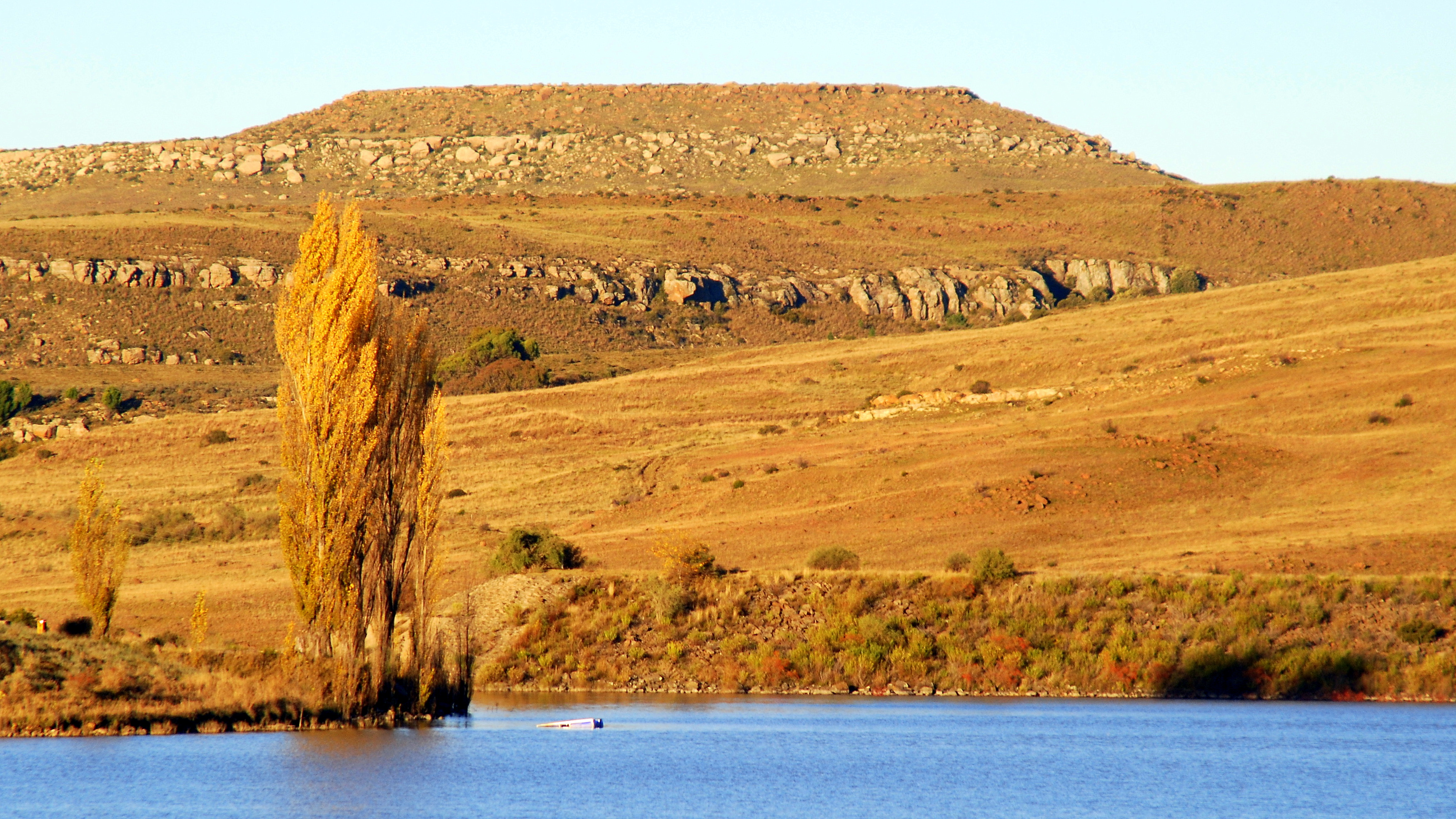
- Molteno Dam outside the town Molteno, Eastern Cape, South Africa
- Type: Geological formation
- Unit of: Stormberg Group
- Sub-units: Bamboesberg Member, Indwe Sandstone member, Mayaputi Member, Qiba Member and Tsomo Member
- Underlies: Elliot Formation
- Overlies: Beaufort Group
- Thickness: up to 600 m (2,000 ft)

Lithology
- Primary: Sandstone, claystone
- Other: Mudstone, siltstone

Location
- Coordinates: 31°23′46″S 26°21′47″E
- Region: Eastern Cape, KwaZulu-Natal & Free State
- Country: South Africa; Lesotho

Type section
- Named for: Molteno, Eastern Cape
- Molteno Formation (South Africa)

The Molteno Formation is a geological formation found in several localities in Lesotho and South Africa. It lies mainly south of Maseru, near Burgersdorp, Aliwal North, Dordrecht, Molteno, and Elliot. It extends as far north as Matatiele in the Eastern Cape. The formation's localities lie along the Drakensberg Mountains in Kwazulu-Natal, and near Ladybrand in the Free State of South Africa. The Molteno Formation is the lowermost of the three formations in the Stormberg Group of the greater Karoo Supergroup. The Molteno Formation represents the initial phase of preserved sedimentation of the Stormberg Group.

== Geology ==
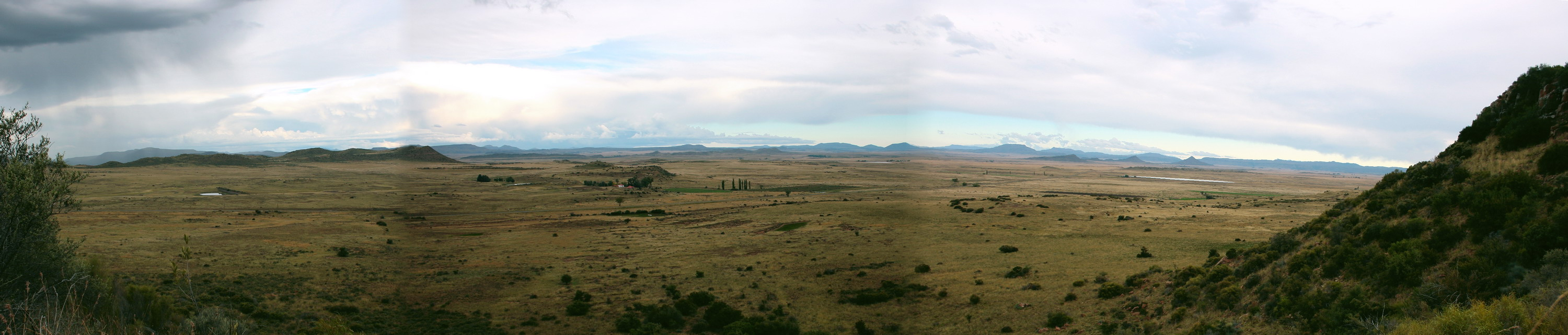
View towards Stormberg Mountains near Molteno, Eastern Cape

The Molteno Formation is the lowermost geological formation of the Stormberg Group. It overlies the Burgersdorp Formation of the Beaufort Group, and underlies the lower Elliot Formation (LEF). Containing alternating finely-grained, medium-grained, and coarse-grained sandstones, the formation features greyish mudstone layers with the coarser sandstones exhibiting trough cross-bedding structures. The mudstones also contain siltstones. The sandstones contain secondary quartz over growths and clasts, giving them a distinctive glittering appearance. Finer-grained sandstones occur throughout the lower deposits of the Molteno Formation, growing coarser toward the upper sections. Sporadic coal seams populate the Molteno Formation, and less common quartz pebble and cobble conglomerates occur in the lower sections. These geological features form part of six stacked fining upward cycles where repeating patterns of the coarser-grained rocks (conglomerates, coarse-grained sandstones) grade upwards into finer-grained rocks (medium to fine-grained sandstone, mudrocks, and coal seams). Sandstones are more common in the lower deposits while mudstones are more dominant in the upper deposits. However, the mudstones are part of repeating fining upward cycles with coarser-grained sandstones and thin coal seams.

The Molteno Formation has five members, from oldest to youngest:

- Bamboesberg Member: (>130 metres (430 ft)) The lowermost member of the Molteno Formation, it is only found in southern/southeastern deposits where it rests conformably over rocks of the Beaufort Group. It is composed almost entirely of fine to medium-grained sandstone, which exhibit fining upward sequences. It also contains thin, lenticular mudstone and siltstone intercalations. In the uppermost sections, two thin coal seams (Indwe and Guba Seams) appear. The Guba Seam caps the Bamboesberg member at its top.
- Indwe Sandstone Member: (>60 metres (200 ft)) This member constitutes the base of the Molteno Formation in its northern localities, lying unconformably over Beaufort Group rocks. Composed primarily of sandstone, these fine upwards although are very coarse-grained in its lower sections. An extremely coarse bed of pebble and cobble conglomerates sits at the base of this member.
- Mayaputi Member: (>50 metres (160 ft)) This member is rich in argillaceous mudstone. A coal seam called the Cala Pass Seam caps this member.
- Qiba Member: (>60 metres (200 ft)) This member contains fine to medium-grained sandstone, thin mudstone layers, and a single coal seam called the Ulin Seam.
- Tsomo Member: (>300 metres (980 ft)) The thickest of the Molteno Formation members, the Tsomo Member exhibits repetitive successions of coarse-grained, pebbly sandstones that grade upwards into mudstone units. Thin, lenticular coal seams appear sporadically across the Tsomo Member. The thickest of the coal seams is the Offa Seam.

The sediments of the different Molteno Formation members preserve the different environments in which they were first deposited. The conglomerates and coarser-grained sandstones were deposited in high-energy braided fluvial systems. The more medium to fine-grained sandstones were deposited in mixed load meandering river channels. The mudrocks were deposited in distal floodplain deposits, and the coal seams in localized peat bogs. The Molteno Formation was part of a greater inland basin, which the Gondwanide mountain range bordered in the south. Braided rivers flowed down from the mountains northwards, steadily joining meandering river channels and eventually meeting with floodplains and marshes.

These depositional environments each have associated fossil flora and fauna that are unique to them. The fossil flora and fauna co-associations reveal different, distinctive habitats that were present during the time. While the different depositional environments were temperate overall, they experienced extreme seasonal differences. Winters were near-freezing with moderate rainfall, and midsummer temperatures were harsh. The Permo-Triassic extinction event occurred a few million years before the Molteno Formation rock sediments were deposited. However, its lingering effects continued to influence the stability of the Earth's climate when the Molteno Formation rocks were deposited.

== Paleontology ==
Local and international paleobotanists and entomologists revere the Molteno Formation for its richly diverse plant and insect fossils. The Molteno Formation fossils include 204 plant species and 333 insect species, making it one of the richest Triassic-age plant and insect assemblages ever discovered. Entomologists consider the insect fauna particularly important, because well-preserved fossil remains of insects are very rare.

The plant and insect fossils had unique ecological co-associations, and occupied distinct habitats. The dominant fossil flora is associated with seven recognized habitat types. The first two habitats include arboreal species of Dicroidium, an extinct genus of seed fern that grew in either lush, riparian forests or more temperate woodlands. Herbaceous forms of Dicroidium are also found but did not dominate. Nineteen species of Dicroidium alone have been recovered from the Molteno Formation.

The next habitat is also temperate woodland, but a different seed fern species dominates it: Sphernobaiera. Another habitat contains thickets of the conifer species Heidiphyllum. Only two other species of conifer are known from the Molteno Formation. Finally, there are Equisetum (horsetail) marshes, comprising 21 species in five genera, and Ginkgophytopsis fern meadows.

The seven habitat types contain various cycad species. Cycads were as diverse as the Equisetum but appear to have been far less common, as only a few specimens have been recovered. Lycopods, bryophytes, Ginkgoales, and 50 species of fern have also been found, as well as associated plant frutifications, organs, and pollens. Fossil leaf impressions and other soft vegetative material of these species appear commonly in the low-energy mudstone-rich depositional environments. The vegetative material occurs near to where the plants had originally grown. On the other hand, floods often swept woody material far away from its original habitat. Petrified wood fragments, cones, and other woody material predominantly lie in the high-energy depositional environments dominated by the coarser sandstones.

The Molteno Formation's insects are considered its most important fossils because of their high diversity. The insect fossils include 333 species and 117 genera. Cockroaches are the most commonly found fossil insect. However, beetles are the most rich in species, with 161 species documented. Other insect fossils include dragonflies, dragonfly aquatic nymphs, and clam shrimp species. Insect and other invertebrate trace fossils have been found in the fine sandstones and mudstone deposits.

Dinosaur trackways have been found in one locality, however, no vertebrate remains have yet been yielded from the Molteno Formation.

== Correlation ==
The Molteno Formation is currently considered to correlate with parts of the Tuli Basin in the northern parts of South Africa, Botswana, and Zimbabwe.
