= Paisia =

Paisia Temporal range: Early Cretaceous

Scientific classification
- Kingdom: Plantae
- Clade: Embryophytes
- Clade: Tracheophytes
- Clade: Spermatophytes
- Clade: Angiosperms
- Clade: Eudicots
- Order: Ranunculales
- Genus: †Paisia; Friis et al.

Species
- Paisia pantoporata Friis et al. 2018

Extinct genus of eudicot plants

Paisia is an extinct genus of eudicot plants from the Cretaceous period. Found in the Almargem Formation, Early Cretaceous (late Barremian–early Albian) near Catefica, Portugal, it was first named by Else Marie Friis, Mário Miguel Mendes and Kaj Raunsgaard Pedersen in 2018. The type species is Paisia pantoporata.
