= Nilssoniopteris =

Nilssoniopteris Temporal range: Kungurian–Lower Cretaceous

Scientific classification
- Kingdom: Plantae
- Clade: Tracheophytes
- Order: †Bennettitales
- Family: †Williamsoniaceae
- Genus: †Nilssoniopteris; Nathorst, 1909

Type species
- †Nilssoniopteris tenuinervis (Nathorst, 1880)

Synonyms
- Taeniozamites Harris, 1932

Extinct genus of seed plants

Nilssoniopteris is an extinct form genus of leaves belonging to the Bennettitales. Leaves are slender and often entire-margined (smooth-edged), though some species have dissected leaves with numerous small segments extending down to the rachis of the leaf. Nilssoniopteris-like leaves are distinguished by their syndetocheilic stomata, indicating bennettitalean affinities. Similar "taeniopterid" leaves are placed in the genus Nilssonia if their stomata are instead haplocheilic (indicating cycad affinities), or Taeniopteris if the cuticle is not preserved. Leaves of Nilssoniopteris vittata from the Middle Jurassic of England are associated with bisexual Williamsoniella reproductive structures.
