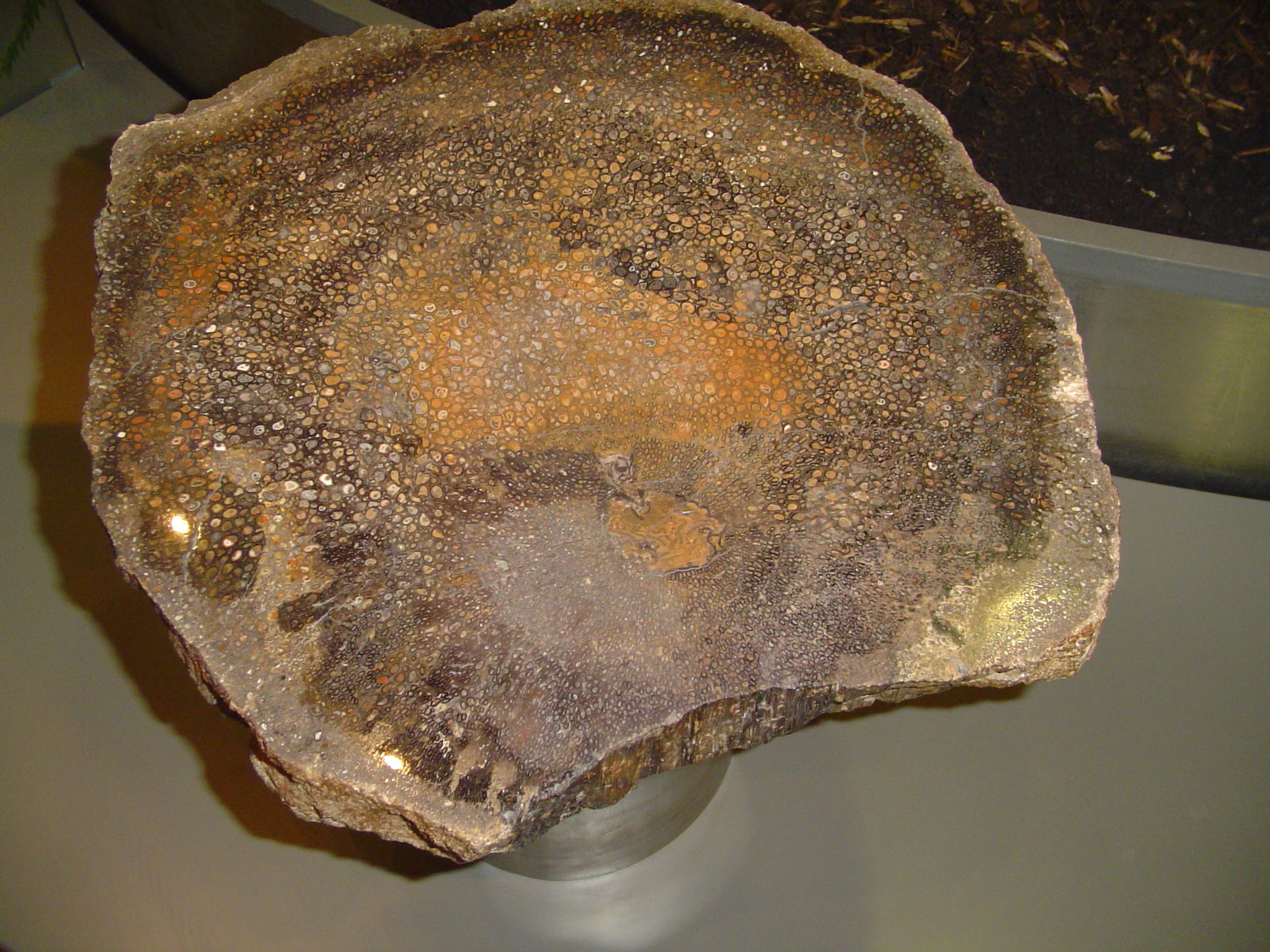
- Palmoxylon sp. wood round

Scientific classification
- Kingdom: Plantae
- Clade: Embryophytes
- Clade: Tracheophytes
- Clade: Angiosperms
- Clade: Monocots
- Clade: Commelinids
- Order: Arecales
- Family: Arecaceae
- Genus: †Palmoxylon; Schenk, 1882

Species
- See text

= Palmoxylon =

Palmoxylon Temporal range: Late Cretaceous-Early Miocene ~84.9–11.6 Ma

Extinct genus of palms

Palmoxylon, also called petrified palmwood, is an extinct genus of palm named from petrified wood found around the world.

== Fossil record ==
This genus is known in the fossil record from the Late Cretaceous to the Miocene (from about 84.9 to 11.6 million years ago). Fossils of species within this genus have been found in Germany, Italy (Sardinia), United States, Egypt, Libya and Argentina (Bororó and Salamanca Formations). Many species were described from the Deccan Traps in India.

== Distribution ==
A number of species from the Cretaceous and Cenozoic have been described from the Patagonia region of South America. There have been a number of species reported from Egypt which are dated to the Late Eocene and Early Miocene.

Specimens from the Oligocene epoch (34 - 23 mya) can be collected from many scattered sites in east Texas and western Louisiana. Fossils found near fossil palmwood include corals, sponges, and mollusks, indicating that the palms grew along prehistoric beaches. For millions of years, the Gulf Coast shoreline has been moving farther south.

In Texas and Louisiana, petrified palmwood is most common in the Toledo Bend area, which is shared by both states. It was left by trees that grew when the Gulf of Mexico's shoreline was much farther north from its present-day position. In Louisiana, petrified palmwood is found in the parishes of Rapides, Natchitoches, Grant, and Sabine.

== Description ==
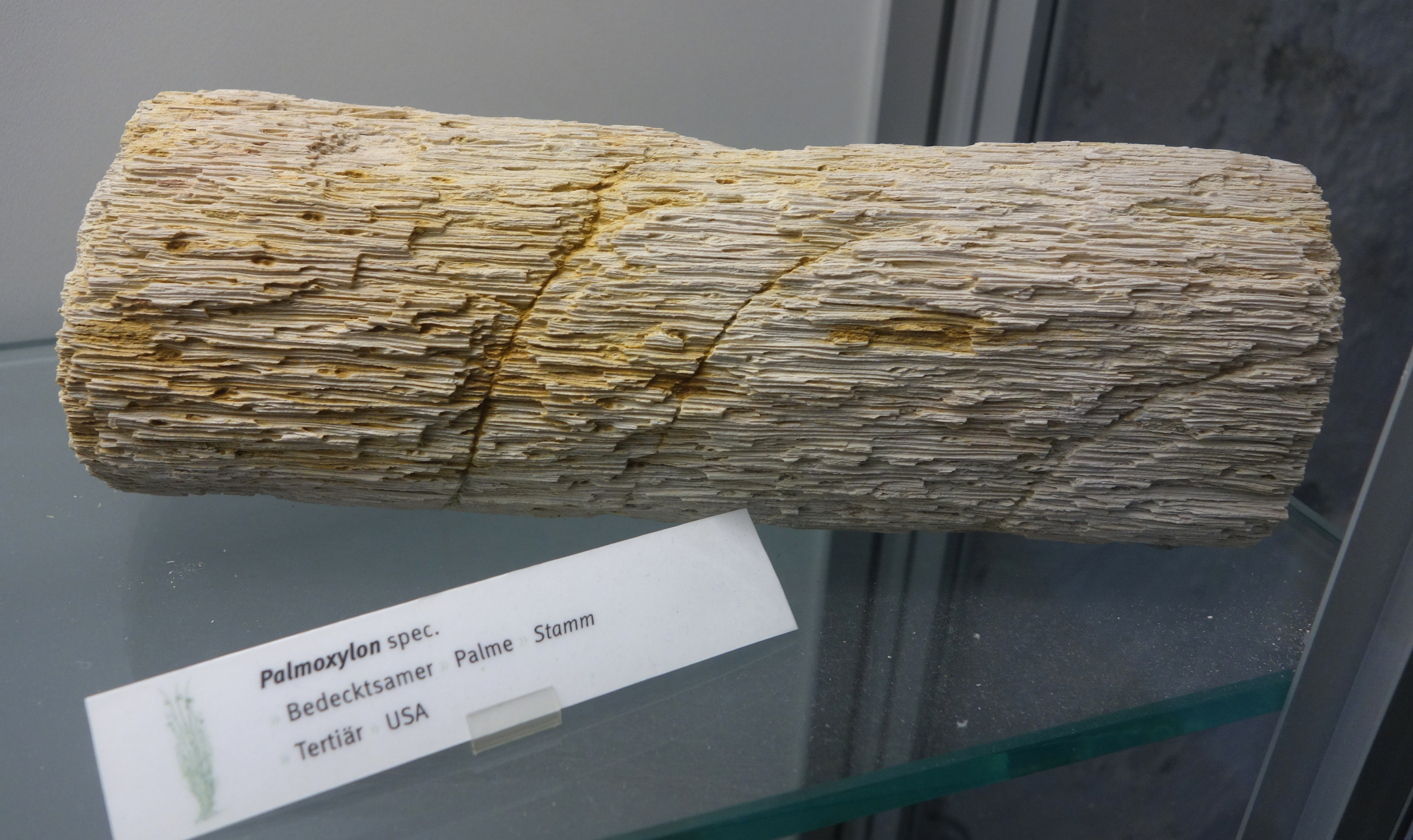
Fossil specimen of Palmoxylon

Petrified palmwood includes a group of fossil woods that contain prominent rod-like structures within the regular grain of the silicified wood. Depending upon the angle at which they are cut by fracture, these rod-like structures show up as spots, tapering rods, or continuous lines. The rod-like structures are sclerenchyma bundles that comprise part of the woody tissues that gave the wood its vertical strength.

Petrified palmwood is a favorite of rock collectors because it is replaced by silica and exhibits well-defined rod-like structures and variety of colors. As a result, it exhibits a wide range of colors and designs when cut that can be incorporated into jewelry and other ornamental items. Because it is composed of silica, it is hard enough to polish and withstand the wear and tear of normal use.

== Archaeology ==
In Grant Parish, Louisiana (and probably in other areas also), Native Americans used petrified palmwood to make projectile points and other tools such as knives, awls, and scrapers. Projectile points and other tools crafted from petrified palmwood have been discovered in central Grant Parish by H.R. Hicks and other Native American artifact collectors. It is the state stone of Texas and the official state fossil of Louisiana.

== Species ==
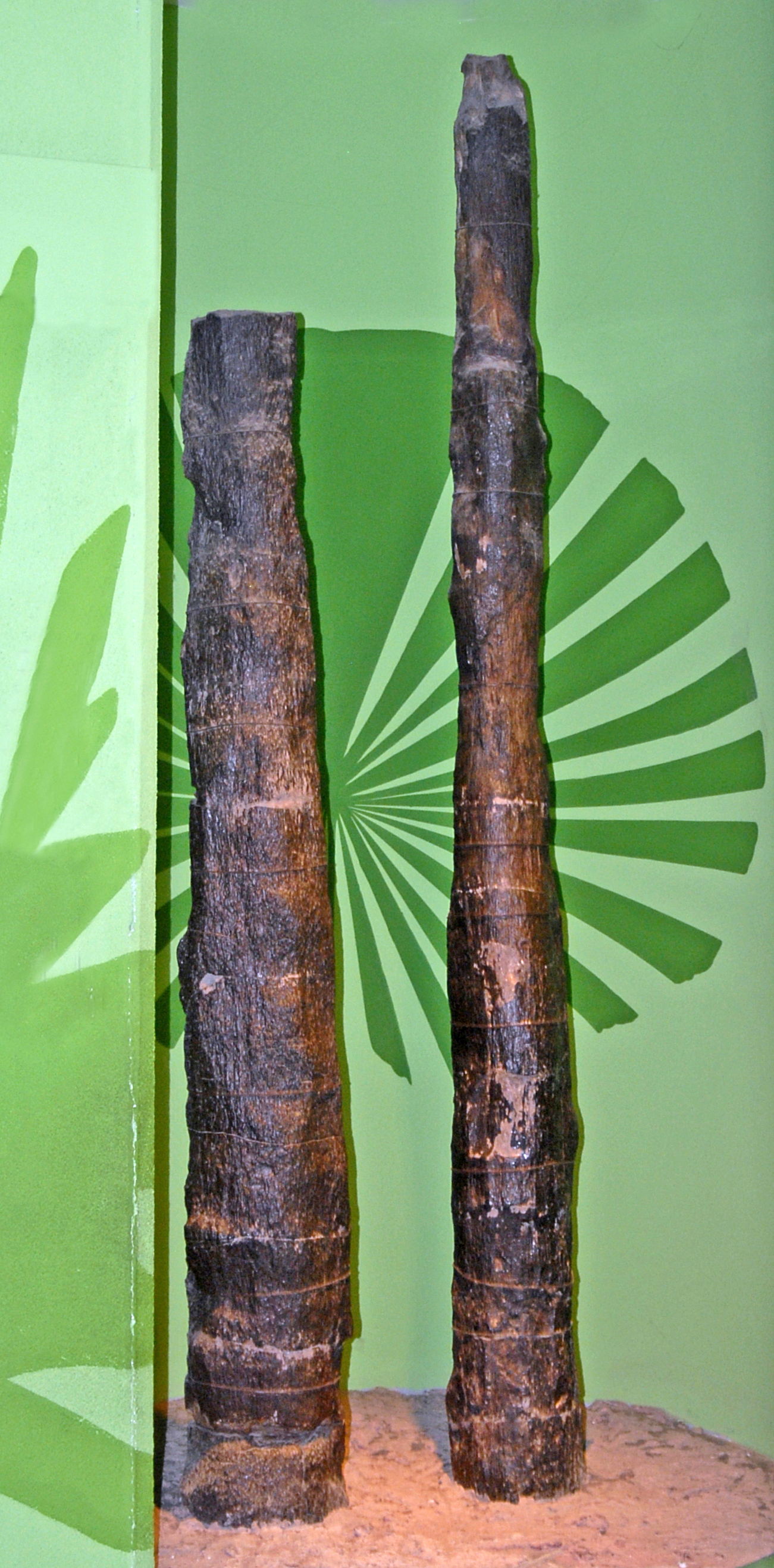
Fossil trunks of Palmoxylon from Quaternary of Libyan Sahara

There are more than 200 species assigned to the genus Palmoxylon at this time.

- Palmoxylon araneus Nour-El-Deen, El-Saadawi & Thomas, 2018 (Paleogene; Jebel Qatrani Formation, Egypt)
- Palmoxylon arcotense
- Palmoxylon bhisiensis Dutta et al., 2007 (Cretaceous; Deccan Traps, India)
- Palmoxylon blandfordi Schenk, 1882 (Cretaceous; Deccan Traps, India)
- Palmoxylon bororoense Arguijo, 1979 (Paleogene; Cerro Bororó Formation, Chubut Province; Argentina)
- Palmoxylon chhindwarense Prakash, 1960 (Cretaceous; Deccan Traps, India)
- Palmoxylon colei (Eocene; Green River Formation, Eden Valley, Wyoming)
- Palmoxylon compactum
- Palmoxylon concordiense
- Palmoxylon contortum (Eocene; Green River Formation, Eden Valley, Wyoming)
- Palmoxylon dakshinense Prakash, 1960 (Cretaceous; Deccan Traps, India)
- Palmoxylon deccanensis Sahni, 1964 (Cretaceous; Deccan Traps, India)
- Palmoxylon dilacunosum Ambwani, 1984
- Palmoxylon edenense (Eocene; Green River Formation, Eden Valley, Wyoming)
- Palmoxylon elsaadawii Nour-El-Deen, El-Saadawi & Thomas, 2018 (Paleogene; Jebel Qatrani Formation, Egypt)
- Palmoxylon eocenum Prakash, 1962 (Cretaceous; Deccan Traps, India)
- Palmoxylon geometricum
- Palmoxylon hislopi Rode, 1933 (Cretaceous, Deccan Traps; India)
- Palmoxylon indicum
- Palmoxylon kamalamRode, 1933 (Cretaceous, Deccan Traps; India)
- Palmoxylon lametaei (Maastrichtian; Lameta Formation, Deccan Traps, India)
- Palmoxylon livistoniforme
- Palmoxylon livistonoides Prakash & Ambwani, 1980 (Cretaceous, Deccan Traps; India)
- Palmoxylon macginitiei (Eocene; Green River Formation, Eden Valley, Wyoming)
- Palmoxylon mathuri Sahni, 1931 (Cretaceous, Gujarat, India)
- Palmoxylon parapaniensis Lakhanpal et al., 1979 (Cretaceous, Deccan Traps; India)
- Palmoxylon parthasarathyi Rao & Menon, 1964 (Cretaceous, Deccan Traps; India)
- Palmoxylon patagonicum Romero 1968 (Paleocene, Patagonia, Argentina)
- Palmoxylon pichaihuensis Ottone, 2007 (Danian, Pichaihue Limestones, Neuquén Province; Argentina)
- Palmoxylon pondicherriense
- Palmoxylon pyriforme
- Palmoxylon qatraniense Nour-El-Deen, El-Saadawi & Thomas, 2018 (Paleogene; Jebel Qatrani Formation, Egypt)
- Palmoxylon queenslandicum
- Palmoxylon rewahense
- Palmoxylon riograndense
- Palmoxylon rionegrense Ancibor, 1995 (Late Cretaceous, Allen Formation, Río Negro Province; Argentina)
- Palmoxylon sagari
- Palmoxylon santarosense Ancibor, 1995 (Late Cretaceous, Allen Formation, Río Negro Province; Argentina)
- Palmoxylon superbum Trivedi & Verma, 1971 (Cretaceous, Deccan Traps; India)
- Palmoxylon trachycarpeaeense Kumar & Khan in Kumar, Spicer & Khan, 2025 (Cretaceous, Deccan Traps; India)
- Palmoxylon valchetense Ancibor, 1995 (Late Cretaceous, Allen Formation, Río Negro Province; Argentina)
- Palmoxylon vaterum Arguijo, 1981 (Paleogene; Cerro Bororó Formation, Chubut Province; Argentina)
- Palmoxylon wadai Sahni, 1931 (Cretaceous; Deccan Traps, India)
- Palmoxylon yuqueriense
