= 2015 in paleobotany =

This article records new taxa of fossil plants that were described during the year 2015, as well as other significant discoveries and events related to paleobotany that occurred in 2015.

== Algaes ==
=== Charophytes ===
Name	Novelty	Status	Authors	Age	Unit	Location	Notes	Images
Chara nikolskae	Nom. nov	Valid	Doweld	Holocene		Kazakhstan	A green alga belonging to the group Charophyta and the family Characeae; a species of Chara. A replacement name for Chara elliptica Nikolskaja (1984) (preoccupied).	
Charaxis martinclosasi	Sp. nov	Valid	Granier et al.	Early Cretaceous (Barremian)		Lebanon	A green alga belonging to the group Charophyta; a species of Charaxis.	

=== Chlorophytes ===
Name	Novelty	Status	Authors	Age	Unit	Location	Notes	Images
Boueina? crassundia	Sp. nov	Valid	Vachard, Krainer & Lucas	Permian (Kungurian)	Los Vallos Formation; San Andres Formation	United States	A member of Codiaceae.	
Boueina? tubulata	Sp. nov	Valid	Vachard, Krainer & Lucas	Permian (Kungurian)	San Andres Formation	United States	A member of Codiaceae.	
Montenegrella? gracilis	Sp. nov	Valid	Sokač & Grgasović	Early Cretaceous (Barremian)		Croatia	A green alga belonging to the group Dasycladales, possibly a species of Montenegrella.	

=== Rhodophytes ===
Name	Novelty	Status	Authors	Age	Unit	Location	Notes	Images
Gymnocodium? bacillum	Sp. nov	Valid	Vachard, Krainer & Lucas	Permian (Kungurian)	Los Vallos Formation; San Andres Formation	Guatemala; United States	A member of Gymnocodiaceae.	
Gymnocodium? johnsonii	Sp. nov	Valid	Vachard, Krainer & Lucas	Permian (Kungurian)	Los Vallos Formation; San Andres Formation	United States; China? Guatemala?	A member of Gymnocodiaceae.	

== Non-vascular plants ==
=== Bryophyta ===
Name	Novelty	Status	Authors	Age	Unit	Location	Synonymized taxa	Notes	Images
Ditrichites ignotus	Sp. nov	valid	Frahm in Frahm & Gröhn	Eocene (Priabonian)	Baltic amber	Europe		A member of Dicranales sensu lato.	
Muscites gracilis	Sp. nov	Valid	Mays & Cantrill in Mays et al.	Late Cretaceous (Cenomanian)	Tupuangi Formation	New Zealand		A leafy moss, a species of Muscites.	
Tricosta	Gen. et sp. nov	Valid	Shelton et al.	Early Cretaceous		Canada		A pleurocarpous moss. The type species is Tricosta plicata.	

=== Marchantiophyta ===
Name	Novelty	Status	Authors	Age	Unit	Location	Notes	Images
Anastrophyllum rovnoi	Sp. nov	Valid	Mamontov et al.	Late Eocene		Ukraine	A liverwort found in Rovno amber, a species of Anastrophyllum.	
Cephalozia veltenii	Sp. nov	Valid	Katagiri	Eocene	Baltic amber	Europe (Baltic Sea coast)	A liverwort belonging to the family Cephaloziaceae found in Baltic amber; a species of Cephalozia.	
Cephaloziella nadezhdae	Sp. nov	Valid	Mamontov, Heinrichs & Váňa in Mamontov et al.	Late Eocene	Rovno amber	Ukraine	A liverwort found in Rovno amber, a species of Cephaloziella.	
Ceratolejeunea sublaetefusca	Sp. nov	Valid	Heinrichs et al.	Miocene	Mexican Amber	Mexico	A liverwort belonging to the family Lejeuneaceae, a species of Ceratolejeunea.	
Frullania riclefgrollei	Sp. nov	Valid	Mamontov et al.	Late Eocene		Ukraine	A liverwort found in Rovno amber, a species of Frullania.	
Mastigolejeunea extincta	Sp. nov	Valid	Heinrichs et al.	Miocene		Mexico	A liverwort belonging to the family Lejeuneaceae, a species of Mastigolejeunea.	
Microlejeunea miocenica	Sp. nov	Valid	Lee et al.	Miocene		Dominican Republic	A liverwort belonging to the family Lejeuneaceae found in Dominican amber, a species of Microlejeunea.	
Notoscyphus balticus	Sp. nov	Valid	Heinrichs et al.	Eocene	Baltic amber	Europe (Baltic Sea coast)	A Jungermannial liverwort.	
Notoscyphus grollei	Sp. nov	Valid	Váňa et al.	Paleogene		Germany	A Jungermannial liverwort found in Bitterfeld amber, a species of Notoscyphus.	
Tetralophozia groehnii	Sp. nov	Valid	Heinrichs, Váňa & Schäfer-Verwimp in Heinrichs et al.	Eocene	Baltic amber	Europe (Baltic Sea coast)	A liverwort, a species of Tetralophozia.	

== Ferns and fern allies ==
Name	Novelty	Status	Authors	Age	Unit	Location	Notes	Images
Adiantitophyllum	Gen. et sp. nov	Valid	Nagalingum & Cantrill	Early Cretaceous	Triton Point Formation	Antarctica (Alexander Island)	A leptosporangiate fern of uncertain phylogenetic placement. The type species is Adiantitophyllum serratum. Possibly also including "Adiantites" lindsayoides from the Koonwarra flora in Australia.	
Arthropitys iannuzzii	Sp. nov	Valid	Neregato, Rößler & Noll in Neregato et al.	Permian	Motuca Formation	Brazil	A member of Calamitaceae, a species of Arthropitys.	
Arthropitys isoramis	Sp. nov	Valid	Neregato, Rößler & Noll in Neregato et al.	Permian	Motuca Formation	Brazil	A member of Calamitaceae, a species of Arthropitys.	
Cladophlebis auriculipilosus	Sp. nov	Valid	Mays & Tosolini in Mays et al.	Late Cretaceous (Cenomanian)	Tupuangi Formation	New Zealand	A fern of probable osmundalean affinity, a species of Cladophlebis.	
Cladophlebis dissecta	Sp. nov	Valid	Nagalingum & Cantrill	Early Cretaceous (Albian)	Triton Point Formation	Antarctica (Alexander Island)	A leptosporangiate fern of uncertain phylogenetic placement, a species of Cladophlebis.	
Cladophlebis drinnanii	Sp. nov	Valid	Nagalingum & Cantrill	Early Cretaceous (Albian)	Triton Point Formation	Antarctica (Alexander Island)	A leptosporangiate fern of uncertain phylogenetic placement, a species of Cladophlebis.	
Cladophlebis macloughlinii	Sp. nov	Valid	Nagalingum & Cantrill	Early Cretaceous (Albian)	Triton Point Formation	Antarctica (Alexander Island)	A leptosporangiate fern of uncertain phylogenetic placement, a species of Cladophlebis.	
Crenulopteris	Gen. et comb. nov.	Valid	Wittry et al.	Carboniferous (Pennsylvanian)			A psaroniaceous marattialean fern. A new genus for "Pecopteris" acadica (1962). Also including "Pecopteris" micromiltoni (1951) and "Pecopteris" lamuriana (1865).	
Equisetocaulis	Gen. et sp. nov	Valid	Rothwell & Ash	Late Triassic (Norian)		United States	A horsetail. The type species is Equisetocaulis muirii.	
Equisetum dimorphum	Sp. nov	Valid	Elgorriaga et al.	Early Jurassic		Argentina	A species of Equisetum.	
Kwazulupteris	Gen. et sp. nov	Valid	Vera & Herbst	Cretaceous (probably Albian–Turonian)	Probably Mzinene Formation	South Africa	A tree fern. The type species is Kwazulupteris schaarschmidtii.	
Lobifolia nana	Sp. nov	Valid	Frolov & Mashchuk	Early Jurassic	Cheremkhovskaya Formation	Russia	A fern, a species of Lobifolia.	
Marattiopsis patagonica	Sp. nov	Valid	Escapa et al.	Early Jurassic		Argentina	A member of Marattiaceae, a species of Marattiopsis.	
Mendozaphyllum	Gen. et sp. nov	Valid	Puebla, Prámparo & Gandolfo	Late Cretaceous (Campanian–Maastrichtian)	Loncoche Formation	Argentina	A member of Marsileaceae. The type species is Mendozaphyllum loncochense.	
Natalipteris	Gen. et sp. nov	Valid	Vera & Herbst	Cretaceous (probably Albian–Turonian)	Probably Mzinene Formation	South Africa	A tree fern. The type species is Natalipteris wildei.	
Neocalamites grojecensis	Sp. nov	Valid	Jarzynka & Pacyna	Middle Jurassic (Bathonian)		Poland	A member of Equisetopsida of uncertain phylogenetic placement, a species of Neocalamites.	
Nunatakia	Gen. et sp. nov	Valid	Nagalingum & Cantrill	Early Cretaceous	Triton Point Formation	Antarctica (Alexander Island); India?	A leptosporangiate fern of uncertain phylogenetic placement. The type species is Nunatakia alexanderensis.	
Osmunda pulchella	Sp. nov	Valid	Bomfleur, Grimm & McLoughlin	Early Jurassic (Pliensbachian)	Djupadal Formation	Sweden	A member of Osmundaceae. Originally described as a species of Osmunda; transferred to the genus Osmundastrum by Bomfleur, Grimm & McLoughlin (2017).	
Osmundacaulis bamfordae	Sp. nov	Valid	Herbst	Cretaceous (Albian-Turonian interval)	Probably Mzinene Formation	South Africa	A member of Osmundaceae, a species of Osmundacaulis.	
Osmundacaulis tidwellii	Sp. nov	Valid	Herbst	Cretaceous (Albian-Turonian interval)	Probably Mzinene Formation	South Africa	A member of Osmundaceae, a species of Osmundacaulis.	
Osmundacaulis whittlesii	Sp. nov	Valid	Smith, Rothwell & Stockey	Early Cretaceous		Canada	A member of Osmundaceae, a species of Osmundacaulis.	
Phlebopteris hazarensis	Sp. nov	Valid	Naugolnykh & Pronin	Late Triassic (Rhaetian)		Kazakhstan	A member of Matoniaceae, a species of Phlebopteris.	
Pleopeltis dominicensis	Sp. nov	Valid	Schneider, Heinrichs & Schmidt in Schneider et al.	Miocene		Dominican Republic	A fern found in Dominican amber, a species of Pleopeltis.	
Shougangia	Gen. et sp. nov	Valid	Wang et al.	Devonian (Famennian)	Wutong Formation	China	A fern-like plant, a euphyllophyte of uncertain phylogenetic placement. Genus includes new species Shougangia bella.	
Sphenopteris sinuosa	Sp. nov	Valid	Nagalingum & Cantrill	Early Cretaceous (Albian)	Triton Point Formation	Antarctica (Alexander Island)	A leptosporangiate fern of uncertain phylogenetic placement, a species of Sphenopteris.	

== Bennettitales ==
Name	Novelty	Status	Authors	Age	Unit	Location	Notes	Images
Anomozamites sanjiaocunensis	Sp. nov	Valid	Zhao et al.	Middle Jurassic	Haifanggou Formation	China	A member of Bennettitales, a species of Anomozamites.	
Ptilophyllum cariae	Sp. nov	Valid	Scanu, Kustatscher & Pittau	Middle Jurassic (Bajocian–Bathonian)	Genna Selole Formation	Italy	A member of Bennettitales, a species of Ptilophyllum.	
Williamsonia carolinensis	Sp. nov	Valid	Pott & Axsmith	Late Triassic	Pekin Formation	United States	A williamsoniaceous bennettitale.	

== Lycophytes ==
Name	Novelty	Status	Authors	Age	Unit	Location	Notes	Images
Lepidodendron wingfieldense	Sp. nov	Valid	Thomas & Seyfullah	Carboniferous (Bashkirian)		United Kingdom	A flemingitaceous lepidodendrale	
Lobodendron	Gen. et sp. nov	Valid	Liu et al.	Late Devonian (Famennian)	Wutong Formation	China	A Lycopsida of uncertain affinities. The type species is L. fanwanense.	
Paurodendron stellatum	Sp. nov	Valid	McLoughlin et al.	Permian (Guadalupian)		Antarctica	An herbaceous Isoetales species.	
Reticuspinosporites	Gen. et sp. nov	Valid	Slater et al.	Middle Jurassic (Bathonian)	Scalby Formation	United Kingdom	Possibly a member or a relative of lycophytes. The type species is R. whytei.	
Retitriletes polygonatus	Sp. nov	Valid	Hashemi-Yazdi, Sajjadi & Dehbozorgi	Middle Jurassic	Dalichai Formation	Iran	A lycophyte spore morphospecies.	

== Czekanowskiales ==
Name	Novelty	Status	Authors	Age	Unit	Location	Notes	Images
Czekanowskia (Harrisella) ordosensis	Sp. nov	Valid	Sun et al.	Middle Jurassic	Yan'an Formation	China	A member of Czekanowskiales, a species of Czekanowskia.	
Phoenicopsis neimengguensis	Sp. nov	Valid	Sun, Na, Dilcher, Wang & Li in Sun et al.	Middle Jurassic	Zhaogou Formation	China	A member of Czekanowskiales, a species of Phoenicopsis.	
Phoenicopsis (Phoenicopsis) odorsensis	Sp. nov	Valid	Li & Sun in Li et al.	Middle Jurassic	Yan'an Formation	China	A Phoenicopsis species Czekanowskiales. The name is spelled Phoenicopsis ordosensis on some pages; which is preoccupied by Phoenicopsis (Culgoweria) ordosensis (2014).	
Solenites baishanensis	Sp. nov	Valid	Li et al.	Early Cretaceous	Yingzuilazi Formation	China	A member of Czekanowskiales, a species of Solenites.	
Solenites gracilis	Sp. nov	Valid	Li et al.	Early Cretaceous	Yingzuilazi Formation	China	A member of Czekanowskiales, a species of Solenites.	

== Ginkgophytes ==
Name	Novelty	Status	Authors	Age	Unit	Location	Notes	Images
Allicospermum budantsevii	Sp. nov	Valid	Gordenko	Middle Jurassic		Uzbekistan	A possible ginkgoalean gymnosperm seed.	
Ginkgo badamgaravii	Sp. nov	Valid	Kostina & Herman in Kostina, Herman & Kodrul	Middle Jurassic (possibly Aalenian)	Bakhar Formation	Mongolia	A relative of the ginkgo.	
Ginkgoidium nundichii	Sp. nov	Valid	Velasco-de León et al.	Middle Jurassic		Mexico	A member of Ginkgoales, a species of Ginkgoidium.	
Pseudotorellia gobiense	Sp. nov	Valid	Kostina & Herman in Kostina, Herman & Kodrul	Middle Jurassic (possibly Aalenian)	Bakhar Formation	Mongolia	A member of Ginkgoales, a species of Pseudotorellia.	
Pseudotorellia mongolica	Sp. nov	Valid	Kostina & Herman in Kostina, Herman & Kodrul	Middle Jurassic (possibly Aalenian)	Bakhar Formation	Mongolia	A member of Ginkgoales, a species of Pseudotorellia.	
Sphenobaiera mixteca	Sp. nov	Valid	Velasco-de León et al.	Middle Jurassic		Mexico	A member of Ginkgoales, a species of Sphenobaiera.	

== Conifers ==
=== Araucariaceae ===
Name	Novelty	Status	Authors	Age	Unit	Location	Notes	Images
Araucariacites mildenhallii	Sp. nov	Valid	Mays	Late Cretaceous; Cenomanian to Turonian	Tupuangi Formation	New Zealand	An araucariaceous pollen.	
Araucarites raghavapurensis	Sp. nov	Valid	Chinnappa, Rajanikanth & Rao	Early Cretaceous	Raghavapuram Formation	India	An araucariaceous conifer.	
Balmeiopsis disca	Sp. nov	Valid	Mays	Late Cretaceous; Cenomanian to Early Turonian	Tupuangi Formation	New Zealand	An araucariaceous pollen.	

=== Cupressaceae ===
Name	Novelty	Status	Authors	Age	Unit	Location	Notes	Images
Acanthostrobus	Gen. et sp. nov	Valid	Klymiuk, Stockey & Rothwell	Cretaceous; Coniacian	Comox Formation; Dunsmuir Member	Canada; British Columbia	A basal cupressaceous genus. The type species is Acanthostrobus edenensis.	
Cupressinoxylon zamunerae	Sp. nov	jr synonym	Bodnar et al.	Middle Triassic	Cortaderita Formation	Argentina	A Cupressaceae sensu lato wood. First described in Cupressinoxylon; Moved to Juniperoxylon zamunerae (2019).	
Protaxodioxylon jianchangense	Sp. nov	Valid	Tian & Wang in Tian et al.	Late Middle Jurassic to early Late Jurassic	Tiaojishan Formation	China	A member of Cupressaceae, a species of Protaxodioxylon.	
Scitistrobus	Gen. et sp. nov	Valid	Spencer, Mapes, Hilton & Rothwell in Spencer et al.	Middle Jurassic (Aalenian)	Bearreraig Sandstone	United Kingdom	A member of Cupressaceae. The type species is Scitistrobus duncaanensis.	
Sequoia maguanensis	Sp. nov	Valid	Zhang & Zhou in Zhang et al.	Late Miocene	Xiaolongtan Formation	China	A relative of the coast redwood.	
Sequoia ochotica	Sp. nov	Valid	Yudova & Golovneva	Late Cretaceous (Turonian-Coniacian)	Arman Formation; Chingandzha Formation	Russia	A species of Sequoia.	

=== Pinaceae ===
Name	Novelty	Status	Authors	Age	Unit	Location	Notes	Images
Pinus maomingensis	Sp. nov	Valid	Xu et al.	Late Eocene	Huangniuling Formation	China	A Pinus subgenus Strobus pine.	
Pinus mikii	Sp. nov	Valid	Yamada, Yamada & Tsukagoshi	Late Miocene	Tokiguchi Formation	Japan	A pine.	
Pinus preyunnanensis	Sp. nov	Valid	Xu & Sun in Xu et al.	Late Miocene	Shengxian Formation	China	A pine.	
Tsuga nanfengensis	Sp. nov	Valid	Bondarenko, Wang & Zhou in Wang et al.	Late Miocene	Xiaolongtan Formation	China	A species of Tsuga.	

=== Other conifers ===
Name	Novelty	Status	Authors	Age	Unit	Location	Notes	Images
Brachyoxylon baqueroensis	Sp. nov	Valid	Vera & Césari	Early Cretaceous	Baqueró Group	Argentina	A cheirolepidiaceous conifer wood.	
Cordaites principaloides	Sp. nov	Valid	Šimůnek	Carboniferous (Pennsylvanian)	Saale Basin	Germany	A Cordaitaceous conifer.	
Cordaites theodorii	Sp. nov	Valid	Šimunek & Haldovský	Carboniferous (Pennsylvanian)	Kladno-Rakovník Basin	Czech Republic	A Cordaitaceous conifer.	
Cordaites yongchangensis	Sp. nov	Valid	Wang et al.	Early Permian		China	A Cordaitaceous conifer.	
Cordaixylon andresii	Sp. nov	Valid	Césari et al.	Carboniferous (Stephanian)		Spain	A Cordaitaceous conifer wood	
Elatocladus velenovskyi	Nom. nov	Valid	Kvaček	Late Cretaceous (Cenomanian)	Peruc-Korycany Formation	Czech Republic	A conifer; a replacement name for "Sequoia" heterophylla (1885). Moved to Elatocladus by Kvaček (2015); however, the name was a junior homonym of Elatocladus heterophylla Halle (1913).	
Estellencsia	Fam., Gen. et sp. nov	Valid	Ruiz & Wachtler	Middle Triassic (Anisian)		Spain	An Estellencsiaceous Abietoidea pinophyte. The type species is Estellencsia saezii.	
Glenrosa carentonensis	Sp. nov	Valid	Moreau et al.	Late Cretaceous (Cenomanian)		France	A member of Coniferales of uncertain phylogenetic placement, a species of Glenrosa.	
Junggaropitys	Gen. et sp. nov	Valid	Shi et al.	Middle-Late Triassic	Karamay Formation	China	A conifer. The type species is Junggaropitys dalongkouensis.	
Krassilovia	Gen. et sp. nov	Valid	Herrera et al.	Early Cretaceous (Aptian-Albian)	Tevshiin Govi Formation	Mongolia	A member of Voltziales. The type species is Krassilovia mongolica.	
Megasylvella	Gen. et sp. nov	Valid	Naugolnykh	Middle Permian (Kazanian)		Russia	A member of Pinophyta belonging to the group Vojnovskyales. The type species is M. ivagorica.	
Mirovia pethiorica	Sp. nov	Valid	Nosova & Kiritchkova	Middle Jurassic (Aalenian–Bathonian)	Sysola Formation	Russia	A conifer, a species of Mirovia.	
Nageia maomingensis	Sp. nov	Valid	Liu, Gao & Jin	Late Eocene	Maoming Basin	China	A species of Nageia.	
Ortiseia collii	Sp. nov	Valid	Ruiz & Wachtler	Middle Triassic (Anisian)		Spain	A member of Coniferales belonging to the family Ortiseiaceae, a species of Ortiseia.	
Pityospermum godavarianum	Sp. nov	Valid	Chinnappa, Rajanikanth & Rao	Early Cretaceous	Raghavapuram Formation	India	A member of Coniferales, a species of Pityospermum.	
Podocarpidites microradiatus	Sp. nov	Valid	Mays	Late Cretaceous (Cenomanian to early Turonian)	Tupuangi Formation	New Zealand	A conifer.	
Podocarpoxylon atuelensis	Sp. nov	Valid	Gnaedinger et al.	Early Jurassic	El Freno Formation	Argentina	A member of Podocarpaceae, a species of Podocarpoxylon.	
Prumnopityoxylon	Gen. et sp. nov	Valid	Franco & Brea	Late Cenozoic	Ituzaingó Formation	Argentina	A member of Podocarpaceae. The type species is Prumnopityoxylon gnaedingerae.	
Pseudofrenelopsis capillata	Sp. nov	Valid	Sucerquia, Bernardes-de-Oliveira & Mohr	Early Cretaceous	Crato Formation	Brazil	A member of Cheirolepidiaceae, a species of Pseudofrenelopsis.	
Taxus guyangensis	Sp. nov	Valid	Xu et al.	Early Cretaceous	Guyang Formation	China	A species of Taxus.	
Xenoxylon yunnanensis	Sp. nov	Valid	Feng in Feng et al.	Middle Jurassic	Shaximiao Formation	China	Apossible Miroviaceous pinophyte.	

=== Conifer research ===
- A study on the morphology, identity and affinity of the purported Cretaceous pitcher plant Archaeamphora longicervia is published by Wong et al. (2015), who interpret the supposed pitchers as insect-induced leaf galls, and consider A. longicervia to be insect-galled leaves of the gymnosperm species Liaoningocladus boii.

== Other seed plants ==
Name	Novelty	Status	Authors	Age	Unit	Location	Notes	Images
Carpolithes phoenixnordensis	Sp. nov	Valid	Smith et al.	Late Eocene		Germany	A seed plant of uncertain phylogenetic affinity.	
Ctenis clarnoensis	Sp. nov	Valid	Edrei & Manchester	Eocene	Clarno Formation	United States	A cycad, a species of Ctenis.	
Ephedra multinervia	Sp. nov	Valid	Yang & Lin in Yang, Lin & Ferguson	Early Cretaceous	Yixian Formation	China	A species of Ephedra.	
Golondrinia	Gen. et sp. nov	Valid	Cariglino	Permian (Guadalupian?-Lopingian)	La Golondrina Formation	Argentina	A member of Glossopteridales belonging to the family Arberiaceae. The type species is Golondrinia archangelskyi.	
Latisemenia	Gen. et sp. nov	Valid	Wang et al.	Devonian (Famennian)	Wutong (Wutung) Formation	China	An early seed plant. The type species is Latisemenia longshania.	
Nanshanopteris	Gen. et sp. nov	Valid	Wan & Wang	Late Permian (Changhsingian)	Sunan Formation	China	A seed fern belonging to the group Peltaspermales. The type species is Nanshanopteris nervosa.	
Peltaspermopsis nebritovii	Sp. nov	Valid	Bukhman, Bukhman & Gomankov	Late Permian		Russia	A seed fern.	
Placotheca	Gen. et sp. nov	Valid	Wang et al.	Devonian (Famennian)	Wutong Formation	China	A member of Lagenospermopsida (a group of plants of uncertain phylogenetic placement, probably spermatophytes). The type species is Placotheca minuta.	
Radicites trimorphus	Sp. nov	Valid	Naugolnykh	Middle Permian (Kazanian)		Russia	A seed plant of uncertain phylogenetic placement described on the basis of isolated roots.	
Sagenopteris nadalii	Sp. nov	Valid	Ruiz & Wachtler	Middle Triassic (Anisian)		Spain	A member of Caytoniales, a species of Sagenopteris.	
Taeniopteris novomundensis	Sp. nov	Valid	Prestianni et al.	Late Triassic (Carnian)		Norway; Switzerland	A seed plant of uncertain phylogenetic placement, probably a member of Cycadophyta; a species of Taeniopteris.	
Thorezia	Gen. et sp. nov	Valid	Prestianni & Gerrienne	Late Devonian		Belgium	A spermatophyte of uncertain phylogenetic placement. The type species is Thorezia vezerensis.	
Thinnfeldia vemavaramensis	Sp. nov	Valid	Chinnappa, Rajanikanth & Rao	Early Cretaceous	Vemavaram Formation	India	A seed fern belonging to the group Corystospermales, a species of Thinnfeldia.	
Warsteinia sancheziae	Sp. nov	Valid	Prestianni et al.	Carboniferous (Tournaisian)		Argentina	An early seed plant, a species of Warsteinia.	
Yiduxylon	Gen. et sp. nov	Valid	Wang & Liu	Devonian (Famennian)	Tizikou Formation	China	A plant of uncertain phylogenetic affinity, an early seed plant or a taxon closely related to seed plants. The type species is Yiduxylon trilobum.	

== Flowering plants ==
=== Basal angiosperms ===
Name	Novelty	Status	Authors	Age	Unit	Location	Notes	Images
Euryale yunnanensis	Sp. nov	Valid	Huang et al.	Late Miocene	Zhaotong Basin	China	A member of Nymphaeaceae related to Euryale ferox.	
Nuphar carlquistii	Sp. nov	Valid	DeVore, Taylor, & Pigg	Eocene; Ypresian	Klondike Mountain Formation	United States; Washington	A water lily	Nuphar carlquistii

=== Unplaced non-eudicots ===
Name	Novelty	Status	Authors	Age	Unit	Location	Notes	Images
Canrightiopsis	Gen. et 3 sp. nov	Valid	Friis et al.	Early Cretaceous (late Barremian–early Albian)	Almargem Formation; Figueira da Foz Formation	Portugal	A member of Chloranthaceae. The type species is Canrightiopsis intermedia; genus also contains Canrightiopsis crassitesta and Canrightiopsis dinisii.	

=== Magnoliids ===
Name	Novelty	Status	Authors	Age	Unit	Location	Notes	Images
Artabotrys siwalicus	Sp. nov.	Valid	Prasad et al.	Late Miocene	Geabdat Sandstone Formation	India	A species of Artabotrys.	
Cryptocaryoxylon oleiferum	Sp. nov	Valid	Ramos, Brea & Kröhling	Late Pleistocene	El Palmar Formation	Argentina	A member of Lauraceae, a species of Cryptocaryoxylon.	
Meiogyne sevokensis	Sp. nov.	Valid	Prasad et al.	Late Miocene	Geabdat Sandstone Formation	India	A species of Meiogyne.	
Paraperseoxylon septatum	Sp. nov	Valid	Franco et al.	Cretaceous	Puerto Yeruá Formation	Argentina	A member of Lauraceae, a species of Paraperseoxylon.	
Piper margaritae	Sp. nov	Valid	Martínez et al.	Late Cretaceous	Guaduas Formation	Colombia	A member of Piperaceae, a species of Piper.	
Pseuduvaria mioreticulata	Sp. nov.	Valid	Prasad et al.	Late Miocene	Geabdat Sandstone Formation	India	A species of Pseuduvaria.	
Tinaflora	Gen. et sp. nov	Valid	Atkinson et al.	Eocene		Canada	A member of Lauraceae. The type species is Tinaflora beardiae.	

=== Monocots ===
Name	Novelty	Status	Authors	Age	Unit	Location	Notes	Images
Chuniophoenix slenderifolia	Sp. nov	Valid	Wang et al.	Oligocene		China	A coryphoid palm tree, a species of Chuniophoenix.	
Dasylarynx	Gen. et sp. nov	Valid	Poinar & Chambers	Eocene or Miocene		Dominican Republic	A monocot of uncertain phylogenetic placement found in Dominican amber. The type species is Dasylarynx anomalus.	
Lejalia	Gen. et comb. nov	Valid	Coiffard & Mohr	Late Cretaceous		Sudan	A member of Araceae; a new genus for "Proteaephyllum" sagenopteroides.	
Livistona roundifolia	Sp. nov	Valid	Wang et al.	Oligocene		China	A coryphoid palm tree, a species of Livistona.	
Orontiophyllum	Gen. et comb. nov	Valid	Kvaček & Smith	Late Cretaceous (Turonian to early Campanian)		Austria; Germany	A member of Araceae. A new genus for "Araciphyllites" austriacus Kvaček & Herman (2005); genus also contains "Zingiberopsis" riggauensis Knobloch (1979).	
Palmoxylon kikaapoa	Sp. nov	Valid	Sainz-Resendiz et al.	Late Cretaceous (Campanian)	Olmos Formation	Mexico	A palm tree wood taxon, a species of Palmoxylon.	
Phoenix windmillis	Sp. nov	Valid	Allen	Eocene		United States	A member of Arecaceae, a species of Phoenix.	
Pseudhaplocricus	Gen. et sp. nov	Valid	Poinar & Chambers	Burdigalian	Dominican amber	Dominican Republic	A member of Commelinaceae. The type species is Pseudhaplocricus hexandrus.	
Smilax miohavanensis	Nom. nov	Valid	Denk et al.	Miocene		Austria; Greece; Turkey	A member of Smilacaceae; a replacement name for "Quercus" aspera Unger (1847) (subsequently transferred to the genus Smilax, which would make it a junior homonym of the extant Smilax aspera).	
Trachycarpus formosa	Sp. nov	Valid	Wang et al.	Oligocene		China	A coryphoid palm tree, a species of Trachycarpus.	

=== Basal eudicots ===
Name	Novelty	Status	Authors	Age	Unit	Location	Notes	Images
Buxus ningmingensis	Sp. nov	Valid	Ma & Sun in Ma et al.	Oligocene	Nigming Formation	China	A species of Buxus.	
Buxus preaustro-yunnanensis	Sp. nov	Valid	Ma & Sun in Ma et al.	Oligocene	Nigming Formation	China	A species of Buxus.	
Menispermites orientalis	Sp. nov	Valid	Golovneva in Golovneva, Herman & Shczepetov	Cretaceous (late Albian–early Turonian)	Krivorechenskaya Formation	Russia	A species of Menispermites.	
Menispermoxylon mowglii	Sp. nov	Valid	Licht, Boura & De Franceschi in Licht et al.	Late middle Eocene		Myanmar	A member of Menispermaceae, a species of Menispermoxylon.	

=== Superasterids ===
Name	Novelty	Status	Authors	Age	Unit	Location	Notes	Images
Anthocephalophyllum	Gen. et sp. nov	Valid	Singh et al.	Early Eocene	Cambay Shale Formation	India	A member of the family Rubiaceae described on the basis of leaf impressions. Genus includes new species A. vastanicum.	
Aralia stratosa	Sp. nov	Valid	Zhu, Huang & Zhou in Zhu et al.	Late Pliocene		China	A member of Araliaceae, a species of Aralia.	
Boraginocarpus algeriensis	Sp. nov	Valid	Hammouda & Weigend in Hammouda et al.	Eocene (Ypresian to Lutetian)	Méridja Formation	Algeria	A member of Boraginaceae belonging to the tribe Echiochileae, a species of Boraginocarpus.	
Cerbera miocenica	Sp. nov.	Valid	Prasad et al.	Late Miocene	Geabdat Sandstone Formation	India	A species of Cerbera.	
Chionanthus siwalicus	Sp. nov.	Valid	Prasad et al.	Late Miocene	Geabdat Sandstone Formation	India	A species of Chionanthus.	
Cornus maii	Sp. nov	Valid	Martinetto	Pliocene		Italy	A species of Cornus.	
Diospyros palaeoargentea	Sp. nov.	Valid	Prasad et al.	Late Miocene	Geabdat Sandstone Formation	India	A species of Diospyros.	
Ebenoxylon cambayense	Sp. nov	Valid	Singh et al.	Early Eocene	Cambay Shale Formation	India	A member of the family Ebenaceae described on the basis of fossil wood.	
Gardenia precoronaria	Sp. nov.	Valid	Prasad et al.	Late Miocene	Geabdat Sandstone Formation	India	A species of Gardenia.	
Gardeniophyllum	Gen. et sp. nov	Valid	Singh et al.	Early Eocene	Cambay Shale Formation	India	A member of the family Rubiaceae described on the basis of leaf impressions. Genus includes new species G. cambayum.	
Goweria bluerimensis	Sp. nov	Valid	Allen, Stull & Manchester	Eocene		United States	A member of Icacinaceae, a species of Goweria.	
Icacinicaryites lottii	Sp. nov	Valid	Allen, Stull & Manchester	Eocene		United States	A member of Icacinaceae, a species of Icacinicaryites.	
Iodes occidentalis	Sp. nov	Valid	Allen, Stull & Manchester	Eocene		United States	A member of Icacinaceae, a species of Iodes.	
Klaprothiopsis	Gen. et sp. nov	Valid	Poinar, Weigend & Henning	Burdigalian	Dominican amber	Dominican Republic	A member of Loasaceae. The type species is Klaprothiopsis dyscrita.	
Lonicera krassilovii	Sp. nov	Valid	Pavlyutkin	Late Miocene	Ust-Suifun Formation	Russia	A honeysuckle.	
Oleoxylon deccanense	Sp. nov	Valid	(Trivedi & Srivastava) Srivastava, et al.	Late Cretaceous–Paleocene (Maastrichtian–Danian)	Deccan Intertrappean Beds (Dhuma Formation)	India	An Oleaceous wood taxon. Originally nomen nudum by Trivedi & Srivastava (1981); Srivastava et al. (2015) validated the name.	
Randia lishensis	Sp. nov.	Valid	Prasad et al.	Late Miocene	Geabdat Sandstone Formation	India	A species of Randia.	
Rhaphithamnoxylon	Gen. et sp. nov	Valid	Franco, Brea & Zavattieri	Middle Miocene	Mariño Formation	Argentina	A member of Verbenaceae related to members of the genus Rhaphithamnus. The type species is Rhaphithamnoxylon artabeae.	
Styracoxylon thyllosum	Sp. nov	Valid	Moya, Brea & Franco	Late Pleistocene	Arroyo Feliciano Formation	Argentina	A member of Styracaceae, a species of Styracoxylon.	

==== Angiosperm research ====
- Pollen grains representing the oldest fossils of members of the family Asteraceae discovered so far are described from the Late Cretaceous of Antarctica by Barreda et al. (2015).

=== Superrosids ===
==== Saxifragales ====
Name	Novelty	Status	Authors	Age	Unit	Location	Notes	Images
Liquidambar maomingensis	Sp. nov	Valid	Maslova et al.	Late Eocene		China	A member of Altingiaceae, a species of Liquidambar.	
Rhodoleia tengchongensis	Sp. nov	Valid	Wu & Sun in Wu et al.	Pliocene (Piacenzian)	Upper Mangbang Formation	China	A species of Rhodoleia.	

==== Vitales ====
Name	Novelty	Status	Authors	Age	Unit	Location	Notes	Images
Vitis siwalicus	Sp. nov.	Valid	Prasad et al.	Late Miocene	Geabdat Sandstone Formation	India	A species of Vitis.	

==== Fabids ====
Name	Novelty	Status	Authors	Age	Unit	Location	Notes	Images
Abaremaxylon	Gen. et sp. nov	Valid	Moya & Brea	Late Pleistocene	Arroyo Feliciano Formation	Argentina	A member of Mimosoideae. The type species is Abaremaxylon hydrochorea.	
Artocarpus basirotundatus	Sp. nov	Valid	Jacques, Shi & Zhou in Jacques et al.	Miocene (Langhian)		China	A member of Moraceae, a species of Artocarpus.	
Bauhinia fotana	Sp. nov	Valid	Jacques, Shi & Zhou in Jacques et al.	Miocene (Langhian)		China	A member of Leguminosae, a species of Bauhinia.	
Bauhinia ungulatoides	Sp. nov	Valid	Lin et al.	Miocene (Langhian)	Fotan Group	China	A member of Leguminosae, a species of Bauhinia.	
Boehmeria fujianensis	Sp. nov	Valid	Jacques, Shi & Zhou in Jacques et al.	Miocene (Langhian)		China	A member of Urticaceae, a species of Boehmeria.	
Calophyllaceophyllum	Gen. et sp. nov	Valid	Singh et al.	Early Eocene	Cambay Shale Formation	India	A member of the family Calophyllaceae described on the basis of leaf impressions. Genus includes new species C. eocenicum.	
Calophyllum striatum	Sp. nov	Valid	Jacques, Shi & Zhou in Jacques et al.	Miocene (Langhian)		China	A member of Calophyllaceae, a species of Calophyllum.	
Carallioipollenites	Gen. et sp. nov	Valid	Singh et al.	Early Eocene	Cambay Shale Formation	India	An angiosperm pollen with a close affinity with Carallia. The type species is C. integerrimoides.	
Castanopsis praefissa	Sp. nov	Valid	Li & Sun in Li et al.	Late Miocene	Shengxian Formation	China	A species of Castanopsis.	
Castanopsis praeouonbiensis	Sp. nov	Valid	Li & Sun in Li et al.	Late Miocene	Shengxian Formation	China	A species of Castanopsis.	
Cedrelospermum asiaticum	Sp. nov	Valid	Jia, Huang & Zhou in Jia et al.	Late Miocene		China	A member of Ulmaceae, a species of Cedrelospermum.	
Cercis usnadzei	Nom. nov	Valid	Lin & Wong	Late Oligocene to middle Miocene		Kazakhstan	A Cercis species. a replacement name for the preoccupied Cercis kryshtofovichii Usnadze (1971).	
Comopellis	Gen. et sp. nov	Valid	Chambers & Poinar	Eocene or Miocene	El Mamey Formation	Dominican Republic	A member of Rhamnaceae found in Dominican amber. The type species is Comopellis presbya.	
Cylicodiscuxylon	Gen. et sp. nov	Valid	Moya & Brea	Late Pleistocene	Arroyo Feliciano Formation	Argentina	A member of Mimosoideae. The type species is Cylicodiscuxylon paragabunensis.	
Deviacer guangxiensis	Sp. nov	Valid	Chen & Manchester	Oligocene	Ningming Formation	China	A member of Polygalaceae, a species of Deviacer.	
Deviacer pidemarmanii	Sp. nov	Valid	Myers & Erwin	Late Eocene–Early Oligocene		United States	A member of Polygalaceae, a species of Deviacer.	
Flacourtia serrulata	Sp. nov	Valid	Jacques, Shi & Zhou in Jacques et al.	Miocene (Langhian)		China	A member of Salicaceae, a species of Flacourtia.	
Gynocardia eocenica	Sp. nov.	Valid	Shukla, Singh & Mehrotra	Early Eocene	Cambay Shale Formation	India	A species of Gynocardia.	
Hydnocarpus ghishiensis	Sp. nov.	Valid	Prasad et al.	Late Miocene	Geabdat Sandstone Formation	India	A species of Hydnocarpus.	
Lithocarpus longchuanensis	Sp. nov	Valid	Mu et al.	Miocene		China	A member of Fagaceae, a species of Lithocarpus.	
Macaranga stellata	Sp. nov	Valid	Jacques, Shi & Zhou in Jacques et al.	Miocene (Langhian)		China	A member of Euphorbiaceae, a species of Macaranga.	
Millettia miosericea	Sp. nov.	Valid	Prasad et al.	Late Miocene	Geabdat Sandstone Formation	India	A species of Millettia.	
Millettia sevokensis	Sp. nov.	Valid	Prasad et al.	Late Miocene	Geabdat Sandstone Formation	India	A species of Millettia.	
Palaeocarya hispida	Sp. nov	Valid	Meng et al.	Late Miocene		China	A member of Juglandaceae, a species of Palaeocarya.	
Paleoochna	Gen. et sp. nov	Valid	Ickert-Bond, Pigg & DeVore	Late Paleocene		United States	A member of Ochnaceae. The type species is Paleoochna tiffneyi.	
Podocarpium eocenicum	Sp. nov	Valid	Xu & Jin in Xu et al.	Eocene	Changchang Formation; Youganwo Formation	China	A member of Caesalpinioideae, a species of Podocarpium.	
Prioria dominicana	Sp. nov	Valid	Poinar & Chambers	Eocene or Miocene		Dominican Republic	A member of Fabaceae belonging to the subfamily Caesalpinioideae found in Dominican amber, a species of Prioria.	
Prunus kunmingensis	Sp. nov	Valid	Su, Wilf & Zhou in Su et al.	Late Pliocene	Ciying Formation	China	A species of Prunus related to the peach.	
Quercus chekryzhovii	Sp. nov	Valid	Pavlyutkin	Early Oligocene		Russia	An oak.	
Quercus heterobracteolata	Sp. nov	Valid	Jia et al.	Late Miocene		China	An oak.	
Quercus kraskinensis	Sp. nov	Valid	Pavlyutkin	Early Oligocene		Russia	An oak.	
Quercus maii	Sp. nov	Valid	Kovar-Eder in Kovar-Eder, Kern & Sun	Late Pliocene	Ma'anshancun Formation	China	An oak.	
Quercus paraglauca	Sp. nov	Valid	Jia et al.	Late Miocene		China	An oak.	
Quercus rajushkinae	Nom. nov	Valid	Doweld	Miocene		Kazakhstan	An oak; a replacement name for Quercus lavrovii Rajushkina (1987) (preoccupied).	
Quercus waltheri	Sp. nov	Valid	Kovar-Eder in Kovar-Eder, Kern & Sun	Late Pliocene	Ma'anshancun Formation	China	An oak.	
Rhamnus siwalicus	Sp. nov.	Valid	Prasad et al.	Late Miocene	Geabdat Sandstone Formation	India	A species of Rhamnus.	
Rubus lanpingensis	Sp. nov	Valid	Huang et al.	Pliocene (Piacenzian)		China	A member of Rosaceae, a species of Rubus.	
Spatholobus siwalicus	Sp. nov.	Valid	Prasad et al.	Late Miocene	Geabdat Sandstone Formation	India	A species of Spatholobus.	
Welkoetoxylon	Gen. et sp. nov	Valid	Boonchai, Manchester & Wheeler	Eocene	Green River Formation	United States; Wyoming	A moraceous wood morphogenus. The type species is W. multiseriatum.	
Zygiaxylon	Gen. et sp. nov	Valid	Kloster & Gnaedinger in Kloster et al.	Miocene	Solimões Formation	Brazil	A member of Fabaceae belonging to the subfamily Mimosoideae. The type species is Zygiaxylon amazonicum.	

==== Malvids ====
Name	Novelty	Status	Authors	Age	Unit	Location	Notes	Images
Acer lincangense	Sp. nov	Valid	Wang et al.	Miocene	Bangmai Formation	China	A maple.	
Bombax palaeomalabaricum	Sp. nov.	Valid	Prasad et al.	Late Miocene	Geabdat Sandstone Formation	India	A species of Bombax.	
Buchanania palaeosessilifolia	Sp. nov.	Valid	Prasad et al.	Late Miocene	Geabdat Sandstone Formation	India	A species of Buchanania.	
Burretiodendron miocenicum	Sp. nov	Valid	Lebreton Anberrée et al.	Late Miocene		China	A species of Burretiodendron.	
Burretiodendron parvifructum	Sp. nov	Valid	Lebreton Anberrée et al.	Early Oligocene to late Miocene		China	A species of Burretiodendron.	
Combretum prechinense	Sp. nov	Valid	Khan, Bera & Spicer in Khan et al.	Middle to late Miocene	Dafla Formation	India	A member of Combretaceae, a species of Combretum.	
Cupania oodlabariensis	Sp. nov.	Valid	Prasad et al.	Late Miocene	Geabdat Sandstone Formation	India	A species of Cupania.	
Lagerstroemia himalayaensis	Sp. nov	Valid	Srivastava, Gaur & Mehrotra	Miocene		India	A member of Lythraceae, a species of Lagerstroemia.	
Melanorrhoeophyllum	Gen. et sp. nov	Valid	Singh et al.	Early Eocene	Cambay Shale Formation	India	An Anacardiaceae leaf morphotaxon. Genus includes new species M. suratum.	
Paranephelium miocenica	Sp. nov.	Valid	Prasad et al.	Late Miocene	Geabdat Sandstone Formation	India	A species of Paranephelium.	
Pleiogynium parvum	Sp. nov	Valid	Rozefelds, Dettmann & Clifford in Rozefelds et al.	Probably Oligocene		Australia	A species of Pleiogynium.	
Pleiogynium wannanii	Sp. nov	Valid	Rozefelds, Dettmann & Clifford in Rozefelds et al.	Latest Oligocene or early Miocene	Riversleigh	Australia	A species of Pleiogynium.	
Pterospermoxylon suratensis	Sp. nov	Valid	Singh et al.	Early Eocene	Cambay Shale Formation	India	A member of the family Malvaceae belonging to the subfamily Dombeyoideae, described on the basis of fossil wood.	
Qualeoxylon felicianensis	Sp. nov	Valid	Moya & Brea	Late Pleistocene	Arroyo Feliciano Formation	Argentina	A member of Vochysiaceae, a species of Qualeoxylon.	
Staphylea levisemia	Sp. nov	Valid	Huang et al.	Latest Miocene to earliest Pliocene	Gray Fossil Site	United States	A member of Staphyleaceae, a species of Staphylea.	
Sterculia miocolorata	Sp. nov.	Valid	Prasad et al.	Late Miocene	Geabdat Sandstone Formation	India	A species of Sterculia.	
Sterculia mioparviflora	Sp. nov.	Valid	Prasad et al.	Late Miocene	Geabdat Sandstone Formation	India	A species of Sterculia.	
Sterculia siwalica	Sp. nov.	Valid	Prasad et al.	Late Miocene	Geabdat Sandstone Formation	India	A species of Sterculia.	
Toddalia miocenica	Sp. nov.	Valid	Prasad et al.	Late Miocene	Geabdat Sandstone Formation	India	A member of the family Rutaceae.	
Vatica prenitida	Sp. nov.	Valid	Prasad et al.	Late Miocene	Geabdat Sandstone Formation	India	A species of Vatica.	
Vatica siwalica	Sp. nov.	Valid	Prasad et al.	Late Miocene	Geabdat Sandstone Formation	India	A species of Vatica.	
Ventilago lincangensis	Sp. nov	Valid	Liu & Xie in Liu et al.	Late Miocene	Bangmai Formation	China	A species of Ventilago.	
Wataria yunnanica	Sp. nov	Valid	Li & Oskolski in Li et al.	Miocene	Dajie Formation	China	A member of Malvaceae, a species of Wataria.	

=== Other angiosperms ===
Name	Novelty	Status	Authors	Age	Unit	Location	Notes	Images
Bamfordphyllum	Gen. et sp. nov	Valid	Passalia, Llorens & Páez	Late Cretaceous	Puesto Manuel Arce Formation	Argentina	A flowering plant of uncertain phylogenetic placement. The type species is Bamfordphyllum crassivena.	
Carpolites pliocucurbitinus	Nom. nov	Valid	Martinetto	Pliocene to Pleistocene (Zanclean to Gelasian)		Italy	An angiosperm seed of uncertain affinity A replacement name for Carpolites cucurbitinus Martinetto (1995) (preoccupied).	
Carpolithes albolutum	Nom. nov	Valid	Smith et al.	Eocene; Ypresian		United Kingdom	An angiosperm seed of uncertain affinity.	
Dicotylophyllum montis-nivium	Sp. nov	Valid	Halamski & Kvaček	Late Cretaceous (Coniacian)		Poland	A dicotyledon of uncertain phylogenetic placement.	
Dicotylophyllum thaddaeiguniae	Sp. nov	Valid	Halamski & Kvaček	Late Cretaceous (Coniacian)		Poland	A dicotyledon of uncertain phylogenetic placement.	
Fairlingtonia	Gen. et comb. nov	Valid	Jud	Early Cretaceous	Potomac Group	United States	An early eudicot of uncertain phylogenetic placement; a new genus for "Sphenopteris" thyrsopteroides Fontaine (1889).	
Saliciphyllum gaetei	Sp. nov	Valid	Marmi et al.	Late Cretaceous (late Maastrichtian)		Spain	A willow-like eudicot, a species of Saliciphyllum.	

== Other plants ==
Name	Novelty	Status	Authors	Age	Unit	Location	Notes	Images
Chelinospora prisca	Sp. nov	Valid	Wellman, Steemans & Miller	Late Ordovician and early Silurian	Qasim Formation; Sarah Formation	Saudi Arabia	An early land plant of uncertain phylogenetic placement, a species of Chelinospora.	
Cryptotetras	Gen. et 2 sp. nov	Valid	Strother, Traverse & Vecoli	Ordovician (Darriwilian to Late Ordovician)	Ghelli Formation; Qasim Formation	Iran; Saudi Arabia	An early land plant of uncertain phylogenetic placement. The type species is Cryptotetras erugata; genus also contains Cryptotetras mordacis.	
Didymospora	Gen. et 2 sp. nov	Valid	Strother, Traverse & Vecoli	Ordovician (Darriwilian)	Qasim Formation	Saudi Arabia	An early land plant of uncertain phylogenetic placement. The type species is Didymospora luna; genus also contains Didymospora fucosogranulata.	
Rimosotetras subsphaerica	Sp. nov	Valid	Strother, Traverse & Vecoli	Ordovician (Darriwilian to Late Ordovician)	Ghelli Formation; Qasim Formation	Iran; Saudi Arabia	An early land plant of uncertain phylogenetic placement, a species of Rimosotetras.	
Tetraplanarisporites	Gen. et sp. nov	Valid	Wellman, Steemans & Miller	Late Ordovician and early Silurian	Ghelli Formation; Qasim Formation; Sarah Formation	Iran; Saudi Arabia	An early land plant of uncertain phylogenetic placement. The type species is Tetraplanarisporites laevigatus.	
