= Permocalculus =

Permocalculus Temporal range: Permian–Cretaceous

Scientific classification
- Clade: Archaeplastida
- Division: Rhodophyta
- Class: incertae sedis
- Family: †Gymnocodiaceae
- Genus: †Permocalculus; G. F. Elliott, 1955

Extinct genus of algae

Permocalculus is a genus of red algae known from Permian to Cretaceous strata. Closely aligned to Gymnocodium, it is placed in the Gymnocodiaceae.
