= 2012 in paleobotany =

This paleobotany list records new fossil plant taxa that were described during the year 2012, as well as other significant paleobotany discoveries and events which occurred during 2012.

== Bryophytes ==
Name	Novelty	Status	Authors	Age	Type locality	Location	Notes	Images
Bryokhutuliinia crassimarginata	Sp nov		Ignatov et al	Late Jurassic	Ukurey formation	Russia	A moss of uncertain placement.	

== Lycophytes ==
Name	Novelty	Status	Authors	Age	Type locality	Location	Notes	Images
Winslowia	Gen. et sp. nov	Valid	Dunn et al.	Carboniferous (Serpukhovian)	Pride Mountain Formation	United States	A member of Isoetales belonging to the group Chaloneriaceae. Genus includes new species W. tuscumbiana.	

== Marchantiophytes ==
Name	Novelty	Status	Authors	Age	Type locality	Location	Notes	Images
Riccardiothallus	Gen. et sp. nov	Valid	Guo et al.	Devonian (Pragian)	Posongchong Formation	China	A liverwort belonging to the family Aneuraceae. Genus includes new species R. devonicus.	

== Ferns and fern allies ==
Name	Novelty	Status	Authors	Age	Type locality	Location	Notes	Images
Korallipteris	Gen. et comb. nov	Valid	Vera & Passalia	Triassic to Miocene		Antarctica; Argentina; Chile; New Zealand	A fern of uncertain phylogenetic placement. A new genus for "Gleichenia" argentinica (1962); Additional species were originally placed in Gleichenia, Gleichenites and Microphyllopteris.	
Millerocaulis tekelili	Sp. nov	Valid	Vera	Early Cretaceous (Aptian)	Cerro Negro Formation	Antarctica (Livingston Island)	An Osmundaceae fern. Originally placed in Millerocaulis; Moved to Claytosmunda tekelili in (2017).	
Osmundopsis rafaelii	Sp. nov	Valid	Escapa & Cúneo	Early Jurassic		Argentina	A member of Osmundaceae.	
Todites cacereii	Sp. nov	Valid	Escapa & Cúneo	Early Jurassic		Argentina	A member of Osmundaceae.	

== Bennettitales ==
Name	Novelty	Status	Authors	Age	Type locality	Location	Notes	Images
Anomozamites harrisi	Sp. nov	Valid	Kiritchkova & Nosova	Early Jurassic (Toarcian)	Кokala Suite	Kazakhstan		
Anomozamites heeri	Sp. nov	Valid	Kiritchkova & Nosova	Early Jurassic (Toarcian)	Кokala Suite	Kazakhstan		
Anomozamites villosus	Sp. nov	Valid	Pott et al.	Probably late Middle Jurassic	Daohugou Beds	China	A member of Bennettitales. Originally described as a species of Anomozamites; Moved to the Wielandiella villosus (2015).	
Cycadolepis barnardii	Sp. nov	Valid	Kiritchkova & Nosova	Early Jurassic (Toarcian)	Кokala Suite	Kazakhstan		
Cycadolepis karatauensis	Sp. nov	Valid	Kiritchkova & Nosova	Early Jurassic (Toarcian)	Кokala Suite	Kazakhstan		
Cycadolepis kirillii	Sp. nov	Valid	Kiritchkova & Nosova	Early Jurassic (Toarcian)	Кokala Suite	Kazakhstan		
Cycadolepis kokalensis	Sp. nov	Valid	Kiritchkova & Nosova	Early Jurassic (Toarcian)	Кokala Suite	Kazakhstan		
Cycadolepis lata	Sp. nov	Valid	Kiritchkova & Nosova	Early Jurassic (Toarcian)	Кokala Suite	Kazakhstan		
Cycadolepis maija	Sp. nov	Valid	Kiritchkova & Nosova	Early Jurassic (Toarcian)	Кokala Suite	Kazakhstan		
Cycadolepis multistomata	Sp. nov	Valid	Kiritchkova & Nosova	Early Jurassic (Toarcian)	Кokala Suite	Kazakhstan		
Cycadolepis pachydermatica	Sp. nov	Valid	Kiritchkova & Nosova	Early Jurassic (Toarcian)	Кokala Suite	Kazakhstan		
Cycadolepis perfecta	Sp. nov	Valid	Kiritchkova & Nosova	Early Jurassic (Toarcian)	Кokala Suite	Kazakhstan		
Cycadolepis prynadае	Sp. nov	Valid	Kiritchkova & Nosova	Early Jurassic (Toarcian)	Кokala Suite	Kazakhstan		
Cycadolepis schairensis	Sp. nov	Valid	Kiritchkova & Nosova	Early Jurassic (Toarcian)	Кokala Suite	Kazakhstan		
Nilssoniopteris chirchilica	Sp. nov	Valid	Kiritchkova & Nosova	Middle Jurassic (Aalenian)	Кokala Suite	Kazakhstan		
Nilssoniopteris localis	Sp. nov	Valid	Kiritchkova & Nosova	Early Jurassic (Toarcian)	Кokala Suite	Kazakhstan		
Nilssoniopteris saveljevii	Sp. nov	Valid	Kiritchkova & Nosova	Middle Jurassic (Aalenian)	Tonasha Formation	Kazakhstan		
Pterophyllum chagaense	Sp. nov	Valid	Kiritchkova & Nosova	Early Jurassic (Toarcian)	Кokala Suite	Kazakhstan		
Pterophyllum doludenkoae	Sp. nov	Valid	Kiritchkova & Nosova	Early Jurassic (Toarcian)	Кokala Suite	Kazakhstan		
Pterophyllum originalum	Sp. nov	Valid	Kiritchkova & Nosova	Early Jurassic (Toarcian)	Кokala Suite	Kazakhstan		
Pterophyllum pаrvisegmentatum	Sp. nov	Valid	Kiritchkova & Nosova	Early Jurassic (Toarcian)	Кokala Suite	Kazakhstan		
Pterophyllum pinniforme	Sp. nov	Valid	Kiritchkova & Nosova	Early Jurassic (Toarcian)	Кokala Suite	Kazakhstan		
Pterophyllum valentinaeа	Sp. nov	Valid	Kiritchkova & Nosova	Early Jurassic (Toarcian)	Кokala Suite	Kazakhstan		
Pterophyllum vsevolodii	Sp. nov	Valid	Kiritchkova & Nosova	Early Jurassic (Toarcian)	Кokala Suite	Kazakhstan		
Williamsonia antonia	Sp. nov	Valid	Kiritchkova & Nosova	Early Jurassic (Toarcian)	Кokala Suite	Kazakhstan		
Williamsonia baranovaeа	Sp. nov	Valid	Kiritchkova & Nosova	Early Jurassic (Toarcian)	Кokala Suite	Kazakhstan		
Williamsonia chagaensе	Sp. nov	Valid	Kiritchkova & Nosova	Early Jurassic (Toarcian)	Кokala Suite	Kazakhstan		
Williamsonia kokalensis	Sp. nov	Valid	Kiritchkova & Nosova	Early Jurassic (Toarcian)	Кokala Suite	Kazakhstan		
Williamsonia vialovaea	Sp. nov	Valid	Kiritchkova & Nosova	Early Jurassic (Toarcian)	Кokala Suite	Kazakhstan		

== "Pteridospermatophytes" ==
Name	Novelty	Status	Authors	Age	Type locality	Location	Notes	Images
Ctenozamites schweitzerii	Sp. nov	Valid	Kiritchkova & Nosova	Middle Jurassic (Bajocian)	Karadiirmen' Formation	Kazakhstan	A member of Pteridospermatophyta of uncertain affinities.	
Eretmonia macloughlinii	Sp. nov	Valid	Ryberg, Taylor & Taylor	Late Permian	Upper Buckley Formation	Antarctica	A member of Glossopteridales.	
Kuvakospermum	Gen. et sp. nov	Valid	Naugolnykh & Sidorov	Permian (Wordian)		Russia	A seed fern belonging to the family Peltaspermaceae. Genus includes new species K. pedatum.	
Lidgettoniopsis	Gen. et sp. nov	Valid	Ryberg, Taylor & Taylor	Late Permian	Beacon Supergroup (upper Buckley Formation)	Antarctica	A seed fern belonging to the group Dictyopteridiales and the family Eretmoniaceae. Genus includes new species L. ramulus.	
Scutum leiophyllum	Sp. nov	Valid	Ryberg, Taylor & Taylor	Late Permian	Beacon Supergroup (upper Buckley Formation)	Antarctica	A member of Glossopteridales belonging to the family Dictyopteridiaceae.	
Vetlugospermum	Gen. et sp. nov	Valid	Naugolnykh	Early Triassic		Russia	A seed fern belonging to the group Peltaspermales. Genus includes new species V. rombicum.	

== Ginkgoales ==
Name	Novelty	Status	Authors	Age	Type locality	Location	Notes	Images
Baiera kazachstanica	Sp. nov	Valid	Nosova & Kiritchkova in Kiritchkova & Nosova	Early Jurassic (Toarcian)	Кokala Suite	Kazakhstan		
Baieroxylon rocablanquense	Sp. nov	Valid	Gnaedinger	Early Jurassic	Roca Blanca Formation	Argentina		
Ginkgo cranei	Sp. nov	Valid	Zhou, Quan, & Liu	upper Paleocene	Sentinel Butte Formation	USA; North Dakota	An extinct species in the modern genus Ginkgo	
Ginkgo gomolitzkyana	Sp. nov	Valid	Nosova	Middle Jurassic	Angren Formation	Uzbekistan	A member of Ginkgoales.	
Ginkgo huolinhensis	Sp. nov	Valid	Dong & Sun	Early Cretaceous	Huolinhe Formation	China		
Ginkgoites barnardianus	Sp. nov	Valid	Nosova & Kiritchkova in Kiritchkova & Nosova	Middle Jurassic (Aalenian)	Кokala Suite	Kazakhstan		
Ginkgoites irdalicus	Sp. nov	Valid	Nosova & Kiritchkova in Kiritchkova & Nosova	Early Jurassic	Ergozi Suite	Kazakhstan		
Ginkgoites kelendensis	Sp. nov	Valid	Nosova & Kiritchkova in Kiritchkova & Nosova	Middle Jurassic (Aalenian)	Tonasha Formation	Kazakhstan		
Ginkgoites ketovianus	Sp. nov	Valid	Nosova & Kiritchkova in Kiritchkova & Nosova	Middle Jurassic (Bathonian)	Sarydiirmeny Suite	Kazakhstan		
Leptotoma asiatica	Sp. nov	Valid	Nosova & Kiritchkova in Kiritchkova & Nosova	Middle Jurassic (Bajocian)	Karadiirmen' Formation	Kazakhstan		
Pseudotorellia karadiirmenica	Sp. nov	Valid	Nosova & Kiritchkova in Kiritchkova & Nosova	Middle Jurassic (Bajocian)	Karadiirmen' Formation	Kazakhstan		

== Conifers ==
=== Araucariaceae ===
Name	Novelty	Status	Authors	Age	Unit	Location	Notes	Images
Emwadea	Gen. et sp. nov	Valid	Dettmann, Clifford & Peters	Early Cretaceous (Albian)	Winton Formation	Australia	A member of the family Araucariaceae. Genus includes new species E. microcarpa.	

=== Cheirolepidiaceae ===
Name	Novelty	Status	Authors	Age	Unit	Location	Notes	Images
Duartenia	Gen. et sp. nov	Valid	Mohr et al.	Early Cretaceous	Crato Formation	Brazil	A possible member of Cheirolepidiaceae. The type species is Duartenia araripensis.	
Glenrosa falcata	Sp. nov	Valid	Gomez, Ewin & Daviero-Gomez	Early Cretaceous (Barremian)	Calizas de La Huergina Formation	Spain	A conifer.	

=== Cupressaceae ===
Name	Novelty	Status	Authors	Age	Unit	Location	Notes	Images
Calocedrus huashanensis	Sp. nov	Valid	Shi, Zhou, & Xie	Oligocene	Ningming Formation	China	A Calocedrus species	
Fokienia shengxianensis	Sp. nov	Valid	He, Sun & Liu	Late Miocene	Shengxian Formation; Xiaolongtan Formation	China	Originally placed in Fokienia. Moved to Calocedrus shengxianensis in (2015).	

=== Pinaceae ===
Name	Novelty	Status	Authors	Age	Unit	Location	Notes	Images
Eathiestrobus	Gen. et sp. nov	Valid	Rothwell et al.	Late Jurassic (Kimmeridgian)	Kimmeridge Clay Formation	United Kingdom	A member of Pinaceae. The type species is Eathiestrobus mackenziei.	
Picea burtonii	Sp. nov	Valid	Klymiuk & Stockey	Early Cretaceous (Valanginian)		Canada	A spruce species seed cone.	
Pinus yorkshirensis	Sp. nov	Valid	Ryberg et al.	Early Cretaceous (Hauterivian-Barremian)	Speeton Clay Formation	United Kingdom	A pine.	

=== Podocarpaceae ===
Name	Novelty	Status	Authors	Age	Unit	Location	Notes	Images
Dacrycarpus puertae	Sp. nov	Valid	Wilf	Eocene		Argentina	A species of Dacrycarpus	

=== Taxaceae ===
Name	Novelty	Status	Authors	Age	Unit	Location	Notes	Images
Marskea kazachstanica	Sp. nov	Valid	Nosova & Kiritchkova in Kiritchkova & Nosova	Early Jurassic (Toarcian)	Kokala Suite	Kazakhstan		
Torreya kazachstanica	Sp. nov	Valid	Nosova & Kiritchkova in Kiritchkova & Nosova	Early Jurassic (Toarcian)	Kokala Suite	Kazakhstan		

=== Other conifers ===
Name	Novelty	Status	Authors	Age	Unit	Location	Notes	Images
Elatocladus bulakus	Sp. nov	Valid	Nosova & Kiritchkova in Kiritchkova & Nosova	Early Jurassic (Toarcian)	Kokala Suite	Kazakhstan	A conifer of uncertain affinities.	
Plyophyllioxylon	Gen. et sp. nov	Valid	Feng et al.	Permian (Roadian/Wordian)	Lower Shihhotse Formation	China	A conifer of uncertain phylogenetic placement. Genus includes new species P. hulstaiense.	

== Other gymnosperms ==
Name	Novelty	Status	Authors	Age	Type locality	Location	Notes	Images
Nilssonia prosvirjakovaea	Sp. nov	Valid	Kiritchkova & Nosova	Middle Jurassic (Bajocian)	Karadiirmen' Formation	Kazakhstan	A cycad.	
Rehezamites	Gen. et sp. nov	Valid	Pott et al.	Early Cretaceous (Aptian)	Yixian Formation	China	A seed plant of uncertain phylogenetic placement. Genus includes new species R. anisolobus.	

== Angiosperms ==
Name	Novelty	Status	Authors	Age	Unit	Location	Notes	Images
Archaeampelos senonica	Sp. nov	Valid	Alekseev	Late Cretaceous		Russia		
Baasia	Gen. et sp. nov	Valid	Estrada-Ruiz et al.	Late Cretaceous (probably early to middle Maastrichtian)	McRae Formation	United States	A member of the family Celastraceae. Genus includes new species B. armendarisense.	
Bertilanthus	Gen. et sp. nov	Valid	Friis & Pedersen	Late Cretaceous		Sweden	An asterid. Genus includes new species B. scanicus.	
Camptodromites sibiricus	Sp. nov	Valid	Alekseev	Late Cretaceous		Russia		
Celastrinites lanceolatus	Sp. nov	Valid	Alekseev	Late Cretaceous		Russia		
Chaneya hainanensis	Sp. nov	Valid	Feng & Jin	Eocene	Changchang Basin	China	A fossil fruit.	
Cissites basicordatus	Sp. nov	Valid	Alekseev	Late Cretaceous		Russia		
Cissus lombardii	Sp. nov	Valid	Manchester, Chen & Lott	Early Oligocene	Mancora Formation	Peru	A species of Cissus.	
Eucalyptus caldericola	Sp. nov	Valid	Hermsen, Gandolfo & Zamaloa	Eocene (Ypresian)		Argentina	A species of Eucalyptus.	
Eucalyptus frenguelliana	Sp. nov	Valid	Gandolfo & Zamaloa in Hermsen, Gandolfo & Zamaloa	Eocene (Ypresian)		Argentina	A species of Eucalyptus.	
Eucalyptus lynchiae	Sp. nov	Valid	Gandolfo & Hermsen in Hermsen, Gandolfo & Zamaloa	Eocene (Ypresian)		Argentina	A species of Eucalyptus.	
Fulleroxylon	Gen. et sp. nov	Valid	Estrada-Ruiz et al.	Late Cretaceous (probably early to middle Maastrichtian)	McRae Formation	United States	A member of the family Myrtaceae. Genus includes new species F. armendarisense.	
Juglandiphyllites microdentatus	Sp. nov	Valid	Alekseev	Late Cretaceous		Russia		
Laurinoxylon stichkai	Sp. nov	Valid	Boonchai & Manchester	Early Eocene	Bridger Formation	United States	A member of Lauraceae described on the basis of fossil wood.	
Laurophyllum calicarioides	Sp. nov	Valid	Bannister, Conran & Lee	Early Miocene		New Zealand	A member of Lauraceae with affinities to members of the genus Litsea.	
Laurophyllum lacustris	Sp. nov	Valid	Bannister, Conran & Lee	Early Miocene		New Zealand	A member of Lauraceae with affinities to members of the genus Beilschmiedia.	
Laurophyllum maarensis	Sp. nov	Valid	Bannister, Conran & Lee	Early Miocene		New Zealand	A member of Lauraceae with affinities to members of the genus Cryptocarya.	
Laurophyllum microphyllum	Sp. nov	Valid	Bannister, Conran & Lee	Early Miocene		New Zealand	A member of Lauraceae with affinities to members of the genus Cryptocarya.	
Laurophyllum otagoensis	Sp. nov	Valid	Bannister, Conran & Lee	Early Miocene		New Zealand	A member of Lauraceae with affinities to members of the genus Beilschmiedia.	
Laurophyllum sylvestris	Sp. nov	Valid	Bannister, Conran & Lee	Early Miocene		New Zealand	A member of Lauraceae with affinities to members of the genus Beilschmiedia.	
Laurophyllum taieriensis	Sp. nov	Valid	Bannister, Conran & Lee	Early Miocene		New Zealand	A member of Lauraceae with affinities to members of the genus Cryptocarya.	
Laurophyllum vulcanicola	Sp. nov	Valid	Bannister, Conran & Lee	Early Miocene		New Zealand	A member of Lauraceae with affinities to members of the genus Beilschmiedia.	
Laurophyllum waipiata	Sp. nov	Valid	Bannister, Conran & Lee	Early Miocene		New Zealand	A member of Lauraceae with affinities to members of the genus Cryptocarya.	
Litseopsis nova-zelandiae	Sp. nov	Valid	Bannister, Conran & Lee	Early Miocene		New Zealand	A member of Lauraceae.	
Mahonia grimmii	Sp. nov	Valid	Güner & Denk	Miocene	Eskihisar Formation	Turkey	A species of Mahonia.	
Mahonia somaensis	Sp. nov	Valid	Güner & Denk	Miocene	Soma Formation	Turkey	A species of Mahonia.	
Morinda chinensis	Sp. nov	Valid	Shi et al.	Eocene	Changchang Formation	China	A species of Morinda.	
Newtonia mushensis	Sp. nov	Valid	Pan et al.	Early Miocene		Ethiopia	A species of Newtonia.	
Palaeophytocrene hammenii	Sp. nov	Valid	Stull in Stull et al.	Middle-late Paleocene	Bogotá Formation	Colombia	A member of Icacinaceae belonging to the tribe Phytocreneae.	
Palaeophytocrene piggae	Sp. nov	Valid	Stull in Stull et al.	Late Paleocene	Sentinel Butte Formation	United States	A member of Icacinaceae belonging to the tribe Phytocreneae.	
Pygmaeoxylon	Gen. et sp. nov	Valid	Estrada-Ruiz et al.	Late Cretaceous (probably early to middle Maastrichtian)	McRae Formation	United States	A magnoliid of uncertain phylogenetic placement. Genus includes new species P. paucipora.	
Pyrenacantha austroamericana	Sp. nov	Valid	Stull in Stull et al.	Late early Oligocene		Peru	A species of Pyrenacantha.	
Schenkeriphyllum glanduliferum	Gen. et sp. nov	Valid	Mohr, Coiffard & Bernardes-de-Oliveira	Early Cretaceous (Aptian)	Crato Formation	Brazil	Fossil magnolialean angiosperm.	
Wilsonoxylon	Gen. et sp. nov	Valid	Boonchai & Manchester	Early Eocene	Bridger Formation	United States	A member of Canellaceae described on the basis of fossil wood. Genus includes new species W. edenense.	
