= Cordaicarpus =

Cordaicarpus Temporal range: 359.2–199 Ma

Scientific classification
- Kingdom: Plantae
- Clade: Tracheophytes
- Clade: Gymnospermae
- Division: Pinophyta
- Class: Pinopsida
- Order: †Cordaitales
- Family: †Cordaitaceae
- Genus: †Cordaicarpus; Geinitz (1862)

Species
- C. acuminatus; C. brasilianus; C. cerronegrensisi; C. chicariensis; C. emarginatus; C. fanatinensis; C. irapuensis; C. mucronatus; C. ovatus; C. prolatus; C. rocha-camposii; C. truncata; C. zeillerii

Extinct genus of conifers

Cordaicarpus is a form genus named by Geinitz (1862) and redefined by Seward (1917) to avoid confusion with another genus and to establish that the genus refers only seeds. Seward defined the differences between Cordaicarpus and Samaropsis.

== Location ==
In Brazil, the fossil species C. brasilianus, C. fanatinensis, and C. truncata are located in outcrop Morro Papaléo in the city of Mariana Pimentel. The species C. cerronegrensisi was located in outcrop Mina Faxinal in the city of Arroio dos Ratos. They are in geopark Paleorrota in Rio Bonito Formation and date from the Sakmarian stage of the Permian Period.
