= Paranephelium spirei =

Scientific classification
- Kingdom: Plantae
- Clade: Tracheophytes
- Clade: Angiosperms
- Clade: Eudicots
- Clade: Rosids
- Order: Sapindales
- Family: Sapindaceae
- Genus: Paranephelium
- Species: P. spirei

Binomial name
- Paranephelium spirei Lecomte, 1911

Species of tree

Paranephelium spirei is an Asian tree species in the family Sapindaceae. It can be found in Indo-China, Hainan island and peninsular Malaysia; no subspecies are listed in the Catalogue of Life. In Viet Nam it may be called trường vải.
