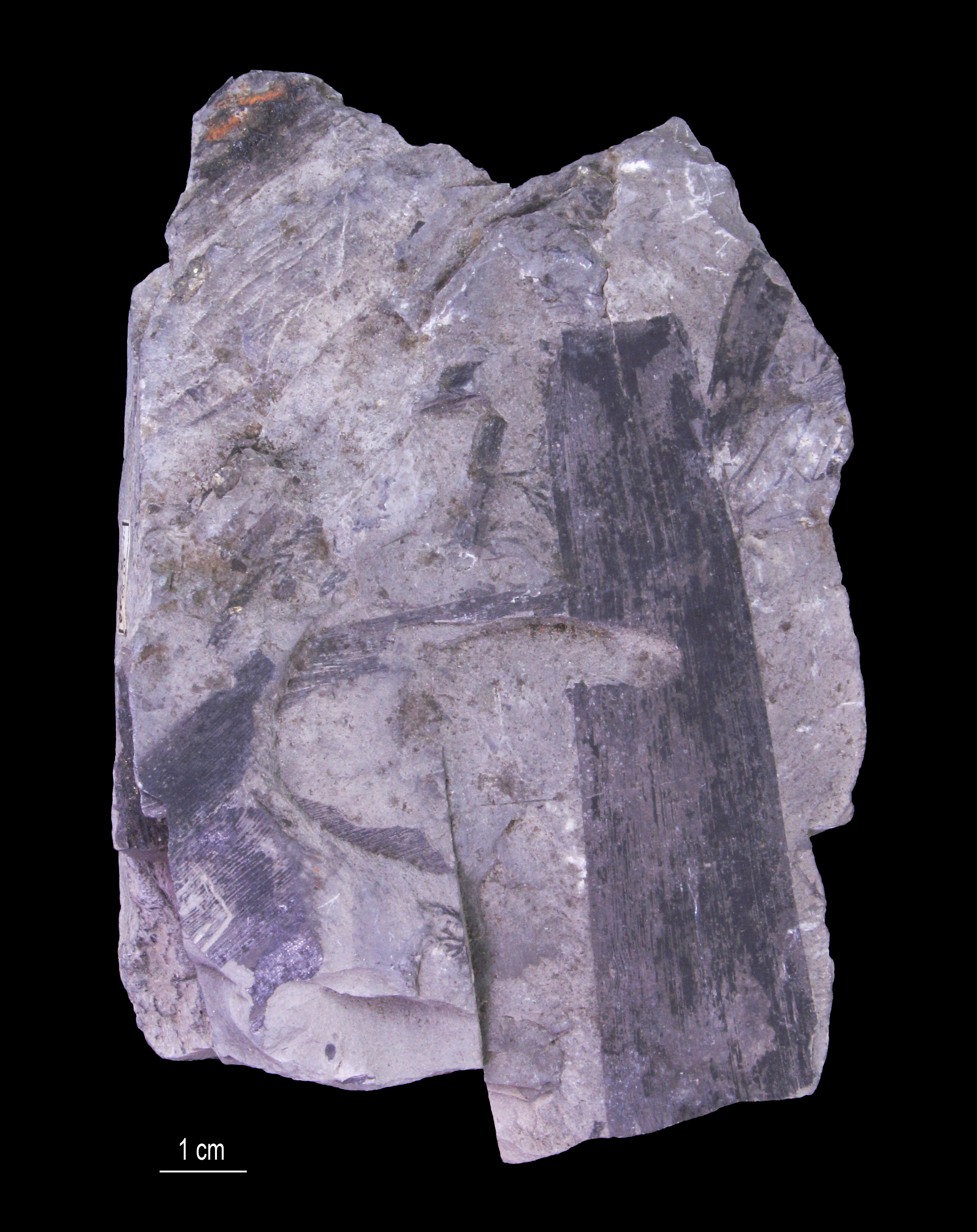
- Fossil bark of a Cordaites sp

Scientific classification
- Kingdom: Plantae
- Clade: Tracheophytes
- Clade: Gymnospermae
- Division: Pinophyta
- Class: Pinopsida
- Order: †Cordaitales
- Family: †Cordaitaceae
- Genus: †Cordaites; Unger

Species
- C. daviessensis; C. hislopii; C. kinneyensis; C. ludlowi; C. lungatus; C. minshallensis; C. olneyensis; C. principalis; C. setlikii

= Cordaites =

Cordaites Temporal range: Pennsylvanian–Changhsingian

Extinct genus of conifers

Cordaites is a genus of extinct gymnosperms, related to or actually representing the earliest conifers. These trees grew up to 100 feet (30 m) tall and stood in dry areas as well as wetlands. Brackish water mussels and crustacea are found frequently between the roots of these trees. Cordaites fossils are most commonly found in rock sections from the Upper Carboniferous (323 to 299 million years ago) of Europe and the Americas.

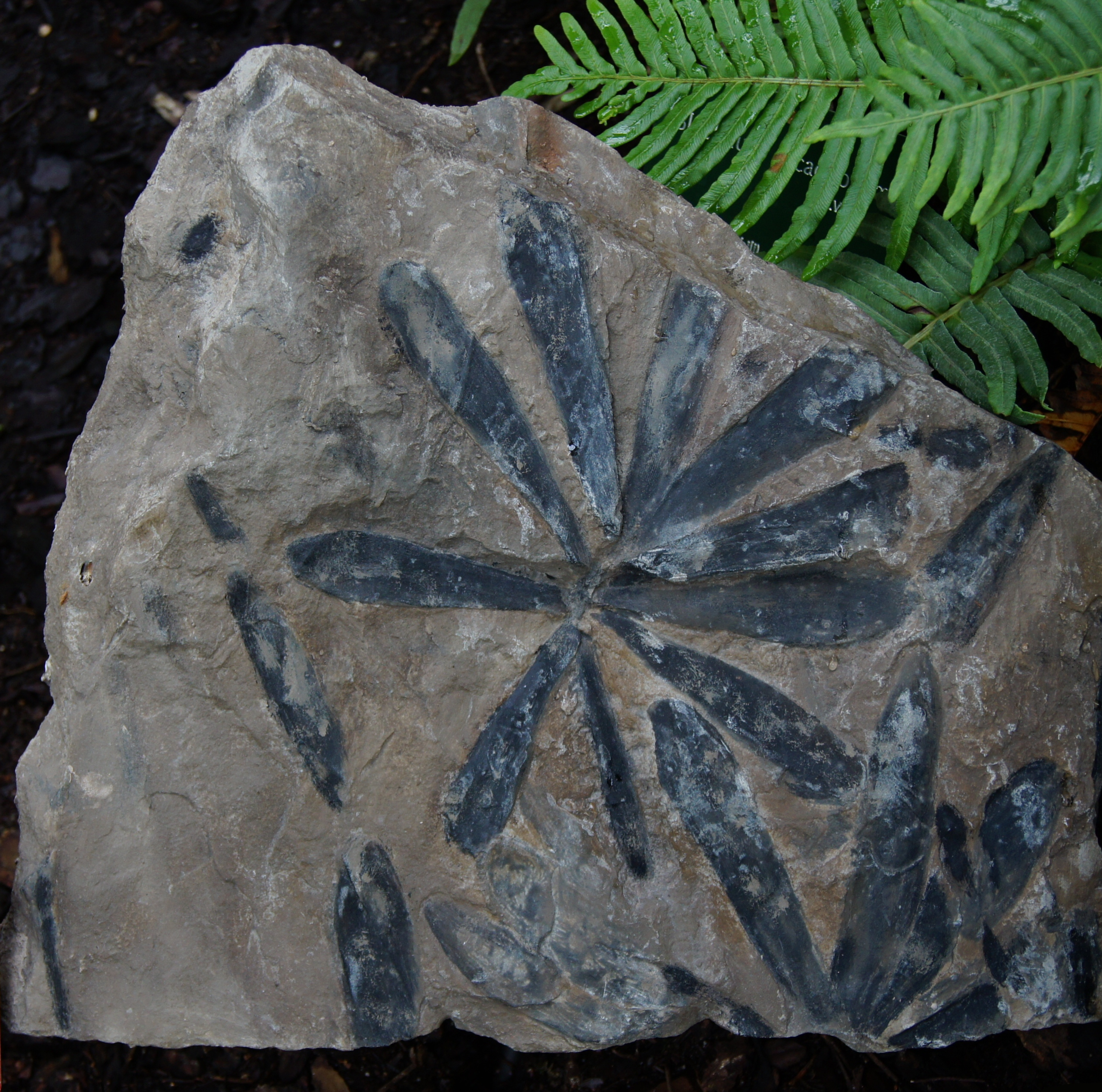
Leaves of Cordaites lungatus

A number of many types from this line are:

- Cordaites principalis
- Cordaites ludlowi (named after Ludlow, a coal area in England)
- Cordaites hislopii. Found in Paleorrota geopark in Brazil.

In contrast to many other plants, fossilized Cordaites seeds are not rare, because they are rather large (up to 10 mm); those seeds are named Cordaicarpus.
