= Introvertocystis =

Introvertocystis Temporal range: Cenomanian–Turonian

Scientific classification
- Genus: †Introvertocystis; C.M. Mays and J.D. Stilwell, 2012
- Species: †I. rangiaotea

Binomial name
- †Introvertocystis rangiaotea C.M. Mays and J.D. Stilwell, 2012

Genus of protists

Introvertocystis is an extinct genus of acritarchs. Introvertocystis rangiaotea is from the Late Cretaceous (Cenomanian–Turonian) Tupuangi Formation of the Chatham Islands, New Zealand.
