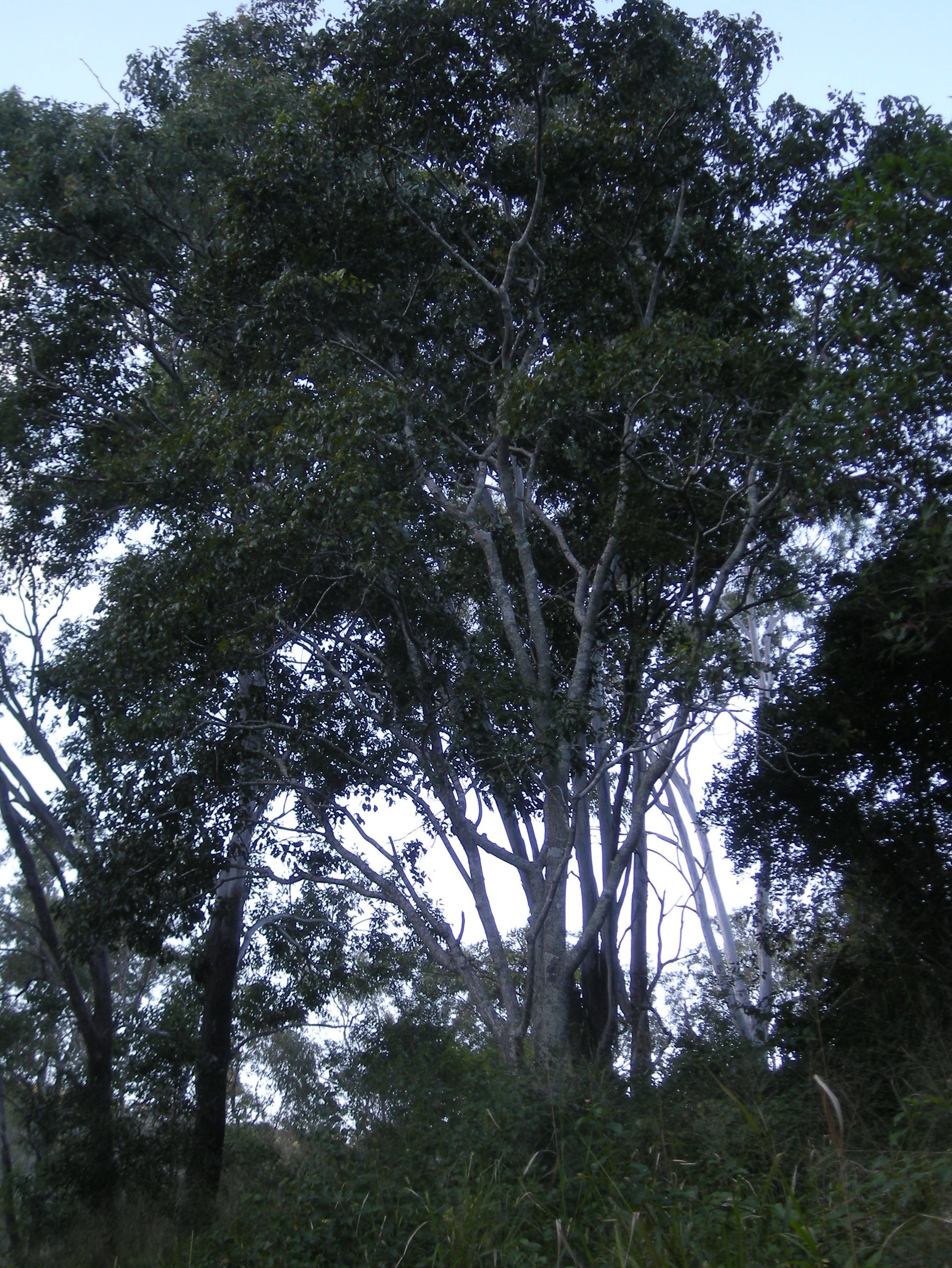

Conservation status
- Least Concern (NCA)
- Least Concern (IUCN 3.1)

Scientific classification
- Kingdom: Plantae
- Clade: Tracheophytes
- Clade: Angiosperms
- Clade: Eudicots
- Clade: Rosids
- Order: Sapindales
- Family: Anacardiaceae
- Genus: Pleiogynium
- Species: P. timoriense

Binomial name
- Pleiogynium timoriense (DC.) Leenh.

Synonyms
- Icica timoriensis DC.; Owenia cerasifera F.Muell.; Pleiogynium cerasiferum (F.Muell.) R.Parker; Pleiogynium cerasiferum var. glabratum Domin; Pleiogynium papuanum C.T.White; Pleiogynium solandri (Benth.) Engl.; Spondias acida Sol. ex Benth.; Spondias pleiogyna F.Muell.; Spondias solandri Benth.

= Pleiogynium timoriense =

Burdekin plum

Species of tree in the cashew family

Pleiogynium timoriense, commonly known as the Burdekin plum, sweet plum, tulip plum, or in the Djabugay language guybalum, is a medium-sized fruit-bearing tree in the cashew and mango family Anacardiaceae native to Malesia, Australia and the Pacific Islands.

== Description ==
Pleiogynium timoriense is a semi-deciduous rainforest tree growing up to 20 m (66 ft) high in rainforests or around 12 m (39 ft) in cultivation, and may develop buttress roots on older individuals. It has a dense canopy with glossy dark green leaves up to 10 cm (3.9 in) long by 6 cm (2.4 in) wide, and the trunk has a rough bark. Leaves are imparipinnate with 5 to 11 leaflets which are arranged opposite and are elliptic to ovate in shape. The stalk of the terminal leaflet is significantly longer than those of the lateral leaflets. There are prominent domatia on the underside of leaflets.

The tree is dioecious (that is, with separate male and female plants) and has yellowish-green flowers which appear between January and March. The flower calyx lobes are about 0.6–1 mm (0.024–0.039 in) long, with ovate petals about 1.7–3.8 mm (0.067–0.150 in) long. Filaments are about 1.3–2.3 mm (0.051–0.091 in) long.

The fruit is a depressed-obovoid drupe, up to 25 by 38 mm (0.98 by 1.50 in). The fruit's flesh is generally plum-coloured (dark purple), however, white varieties have been reported. The fruit is edible when ripe.

== Taxonomy ==
The basionym of this species is Icica timoriensis, and was originally described in Prodromus Systematis Naturalis Regni Vegetabilis by Augustin Pyramus de Candolle in 1825. It was renamed Pleiogynium timoriense in 1952 by Pieter Willem Leenhouts in the journal Blumea. A number of other botanists, notably Daniel Solander, Ferdinand von Mueller and George Bentham, have also described specimens of this species under different names, all of which are now heterotypic synonyms of Pleiogynium timoriense

== Etymology ==
The genus name Pleiogynium derives from the Ancient Greek pleíōn meaning "more", and gunḗ meaning "female". It refers to the numerous carpels in the flowers. The species epithet means "from Timor", where the first specimen was collected.

== Distribution ==
The natural range of P. timoriense includes Borneo, Sulawesi, the Philippines, the Moluccas, New Guinea, the Solomon Islands, the Cook Islands, Tonga, Fiji, New Caledonia, and Queensland. It grows in rainforest and monsoon forest at elevations from sea level to 1,000 m (3,300 ft), and is often found along water courses. In Queensland, the species occurs in dry rainforest, littoral and subcoastal riverine rainforest north from around Gympie.

== Ecology ==
The fruits are eaten by cassowaries and great bowerbirds.

== Uses ==
The fruit is edible but tart, although the pale greenish varieties have been found to be more palatable. Indigenous Australians are known to have buried the fruit underground to ripen. Fruit can be cooked, eaten raw or used in jellies, jams and preserves.

Joseph Banks, on his voyage to Australia with Captain James Cook, collected some of the fruits when they stopped in the Endeavour River, and he made the note: "These when gathered off from the tree were very hard and disagreeable but after being kept for a few days became soft and tasted much like indifferent Damsons".

The timber is decorative but seldom used due to the lack of supply of good logs.

== Gallery ==
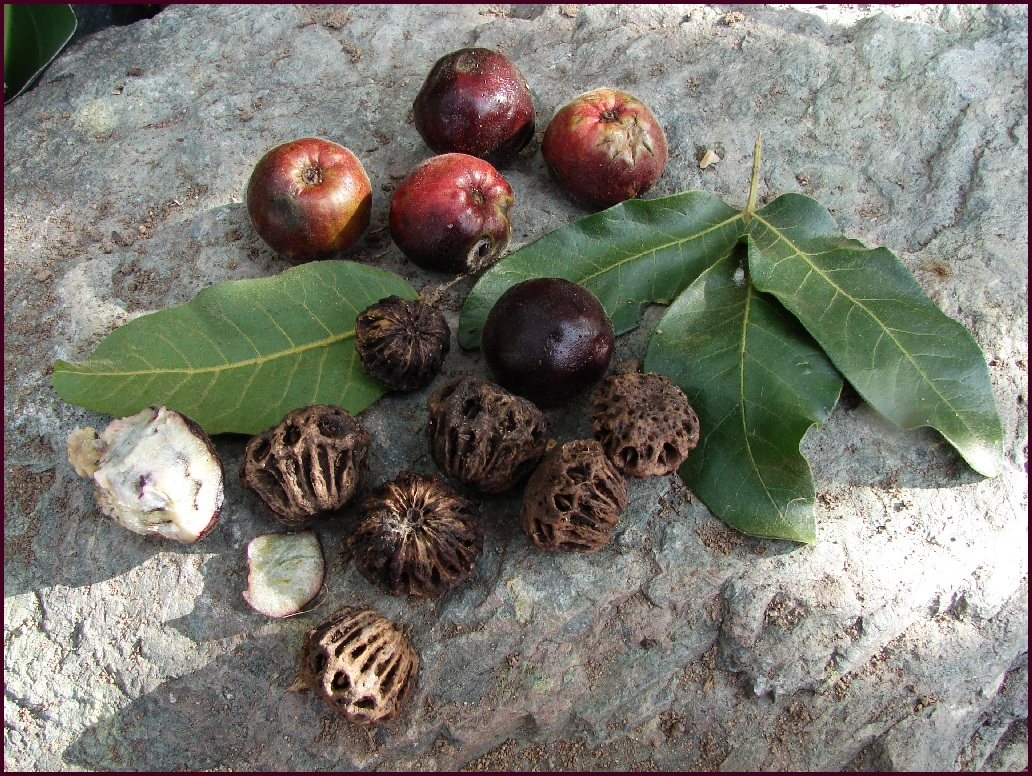
Fruit and seeds

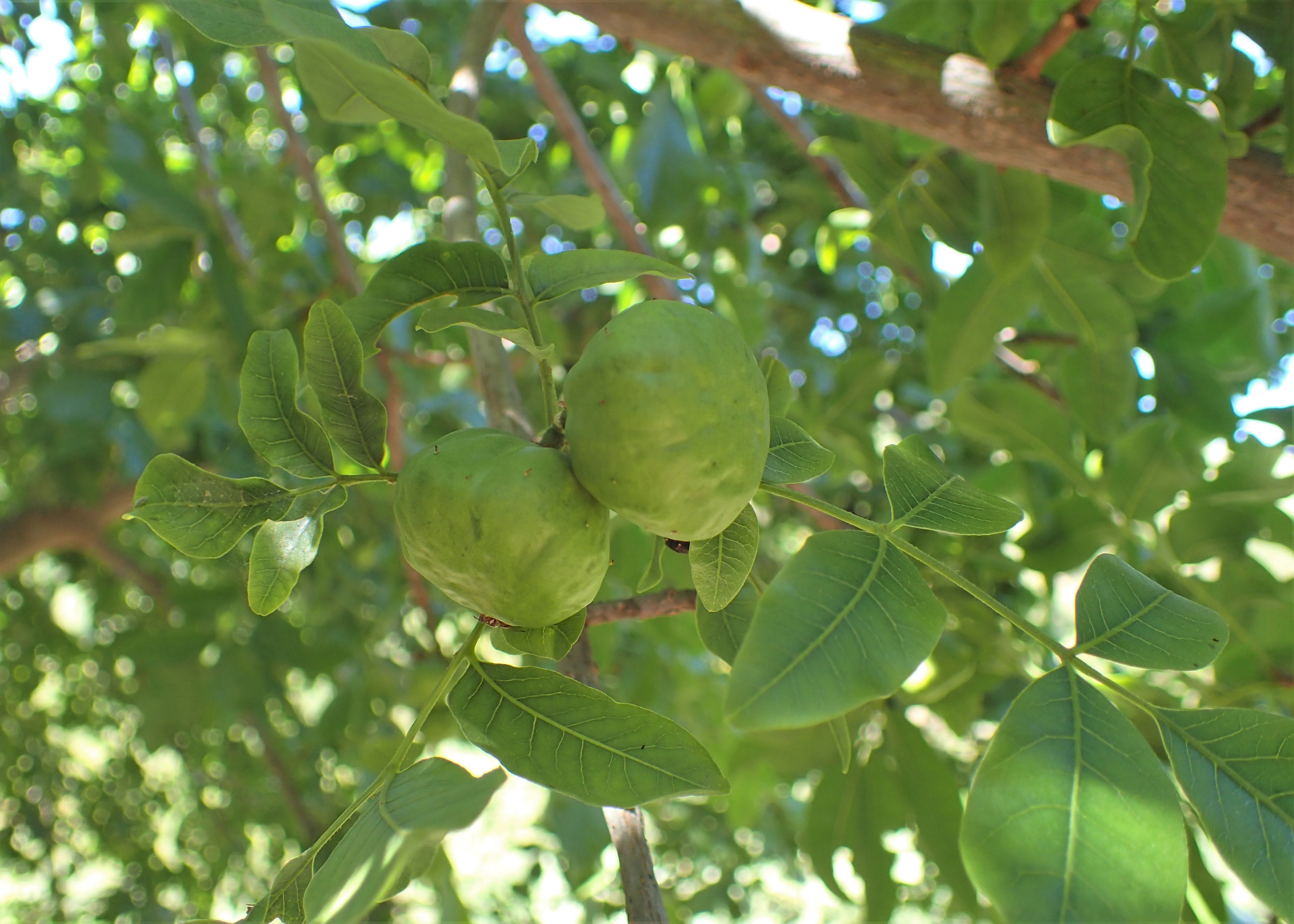
Unripe fruit

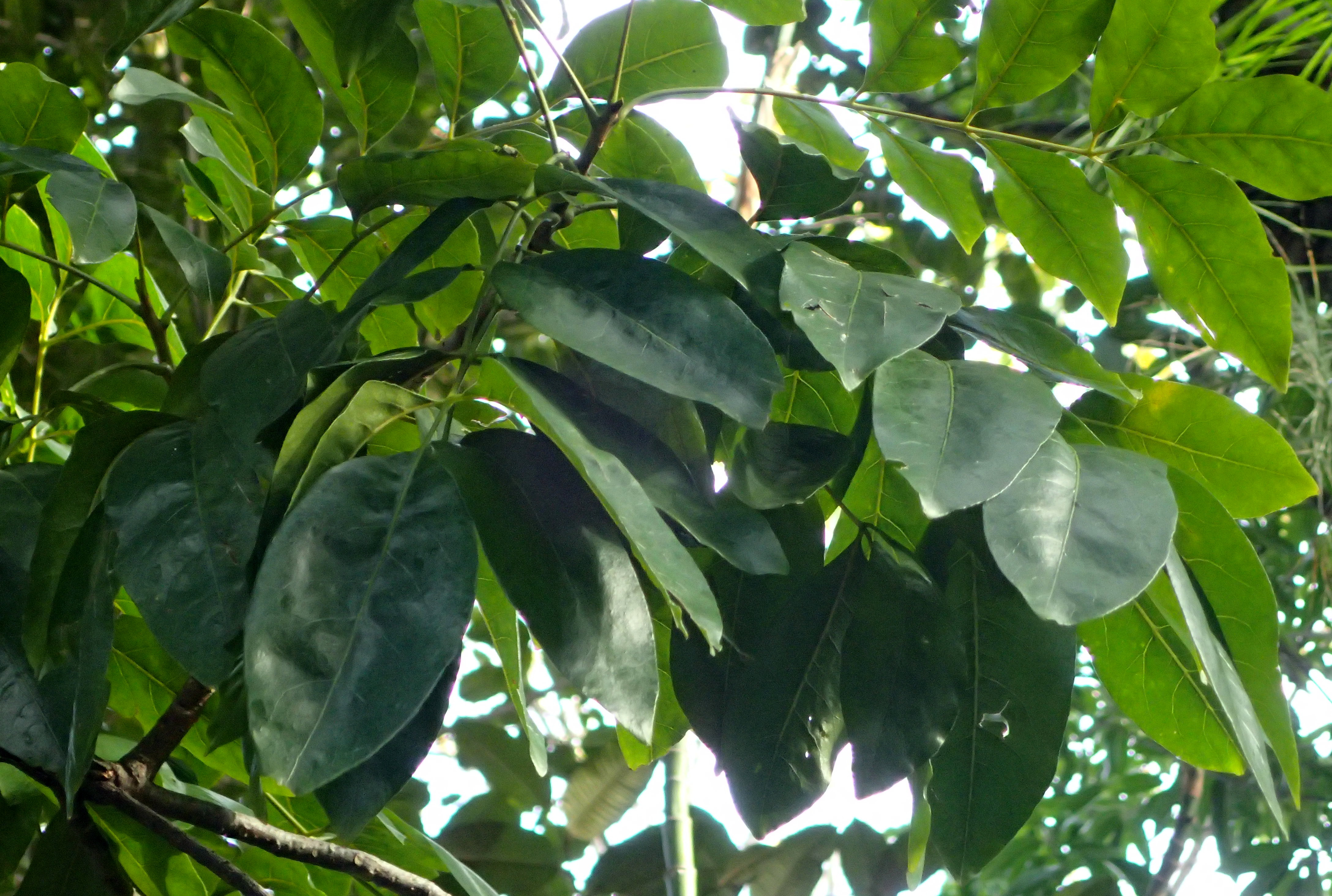
Foliage

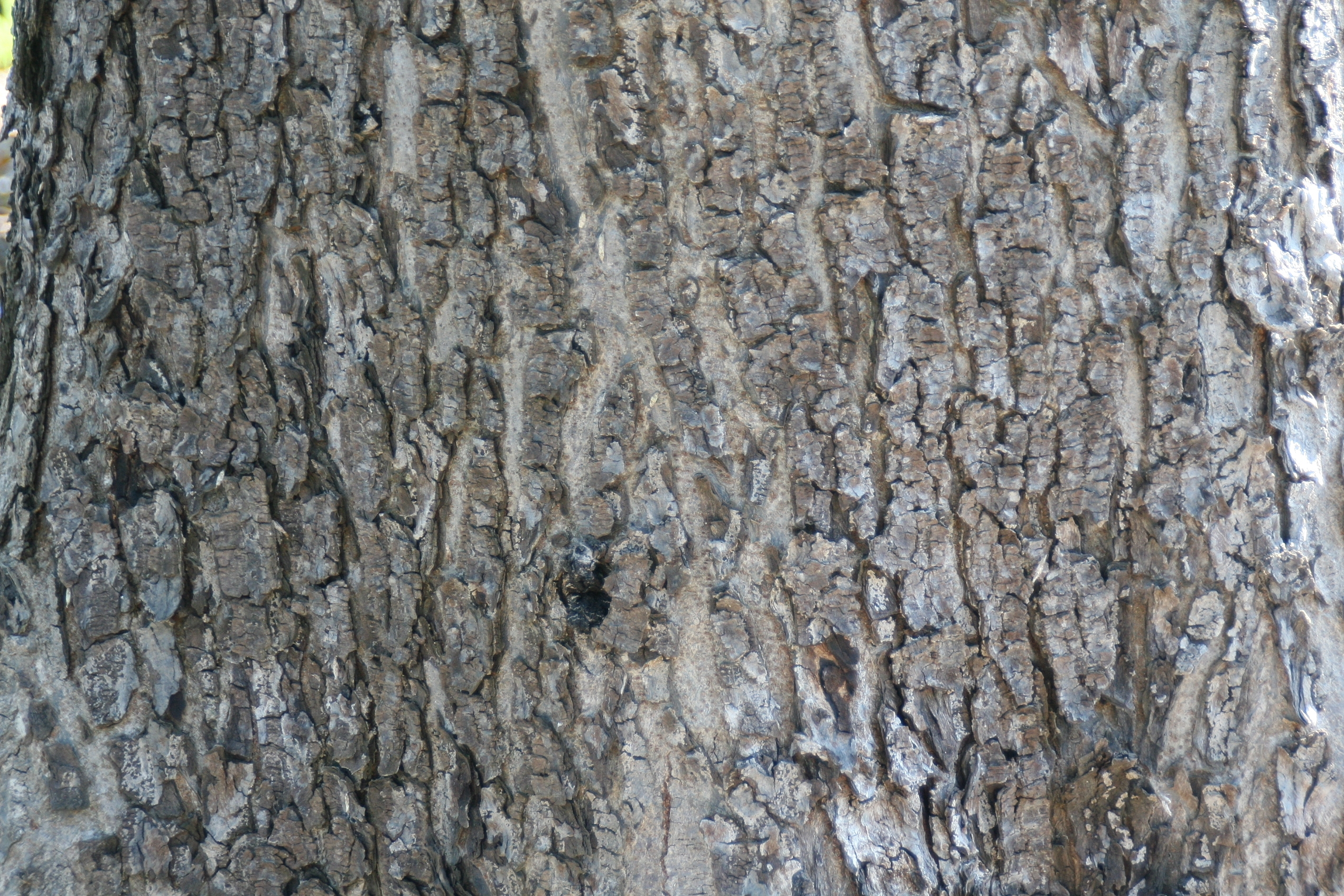
Bark

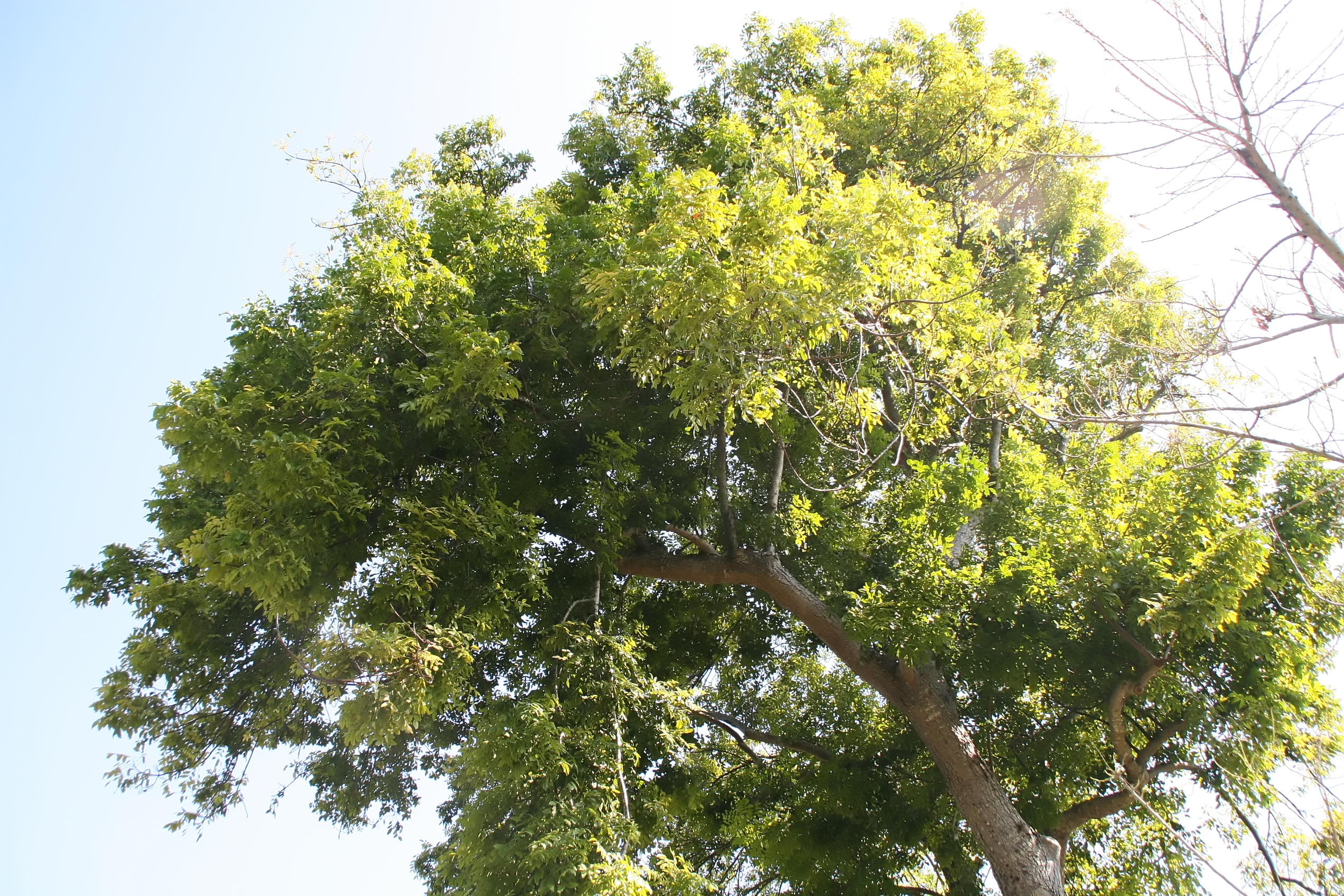
Tree
