= Paranephelium hainanense =

Conservation status
- Endangered (IUCN 2.3)

Scientific classification
- Kingdom: Plantae
- Clade: Tracheophytes
- Clade: Angiosperms
- Clade: Eudicots
- Clade: Rosids
- Order: Sapindales
- Family: Sapindaceae
- Genus: Paranephelium
- Species: P. hainanense

Binomial name
- Paranephelium hainanense H.S.Lo

Species of flowering plant

Paranephelium hainanensis is a species of flowering plant in the family Sapindaceae. It is a tree endemic to Hainan, an island province in southern China. It is threatened by habitat loss.
