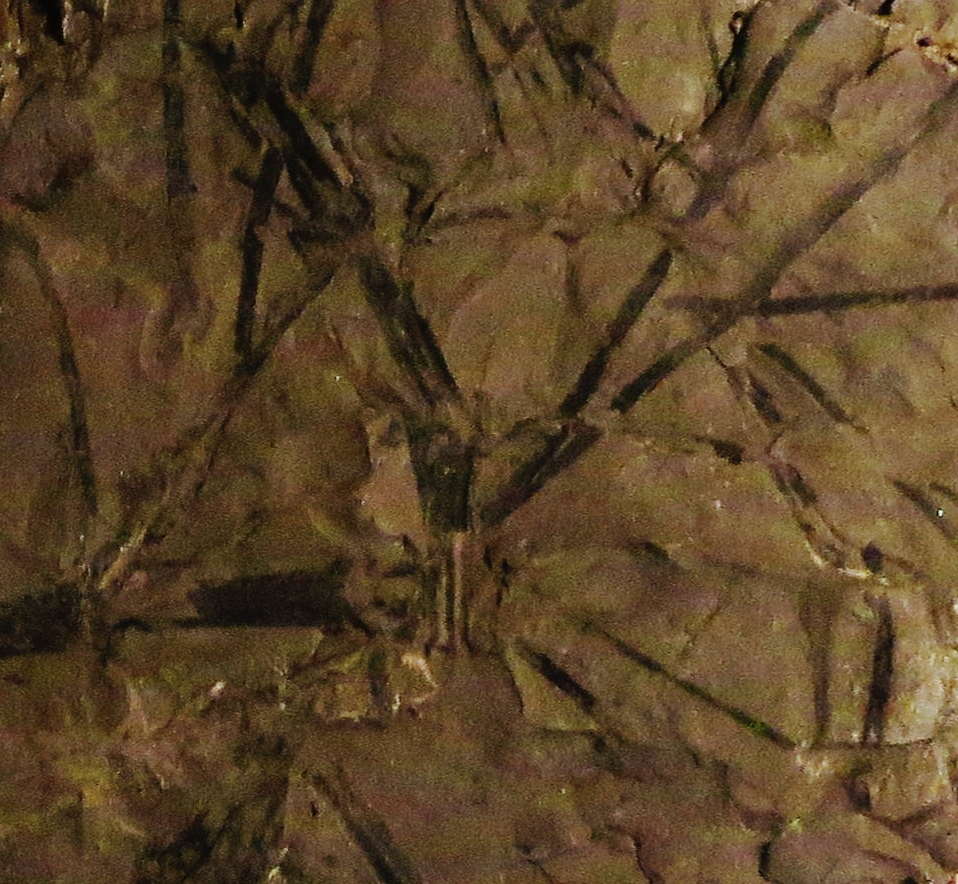

Trace fossil classification
- Ichnogenus: †Radicites; Potonié, 1893

= Radicites =

Radicites Temporal range: Early Permian–Late Cretaceous

Trace fossil

Radicites is a taxonomic name applied to certain types of fossilized root traces preserved in sedimentary rocks. These fossils are most commonly found in paleosols from the Mesozoic era, though some specimens are known from as early as the Permian period. The various fossils assigned to Radicites likely represent root systems from a range of plant groups, including horsetails and conifers. Radicites occurs in a range of depositional environments, from wet marshes to semi-arid, desert-like conditions. They are most commonly known from the Old World.
