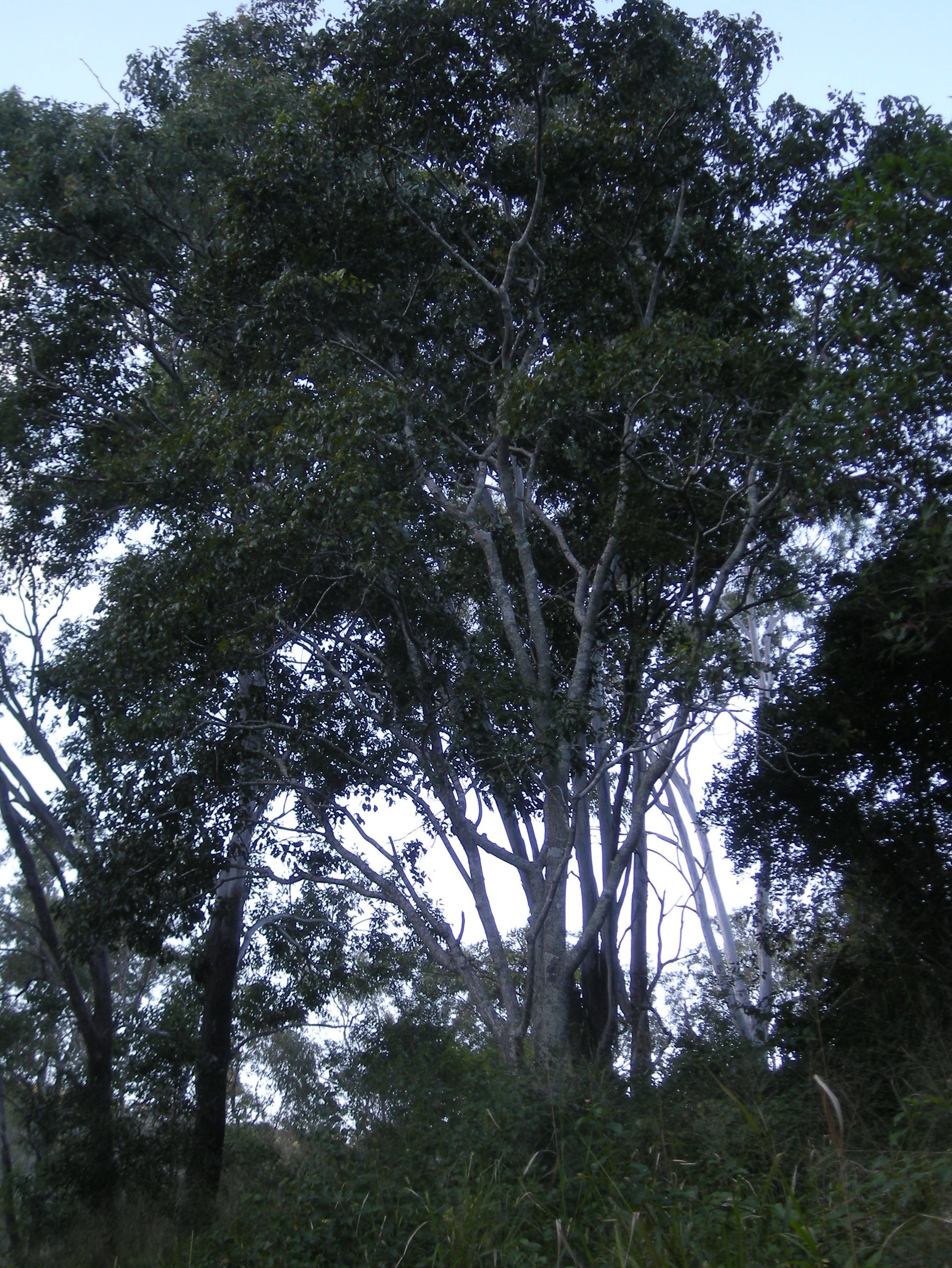
- Pleiogynium timoriense

Scientific classification
- Kingdom: Plantae
- Clade: Tracheophytes
- Clade: Angiosperms
- Clade: Eudicots
- Clade: Rosids
- Order: Sapindales
- Family: Anacardiaceae
- Subfamily: Spondiadoideae
- Genus: Pleiogynium; Engl.

Type species
- Pleiogynium solandri

= Pleiogynium =

Genus of trees

Pleiogynium is a genus of flowering plant of the family Anacardiaceae. It was defined by German botanist Adolf Engler in 1883. The Burdekin plum (P. timoriense) is a notable member.

== Species ==
- Pleiogynium cerasiferum
- Pleiogynium hapalum
- Pleiogynium papuanum
- Pleiogynium solandri
- Pleiogynium timoriense
