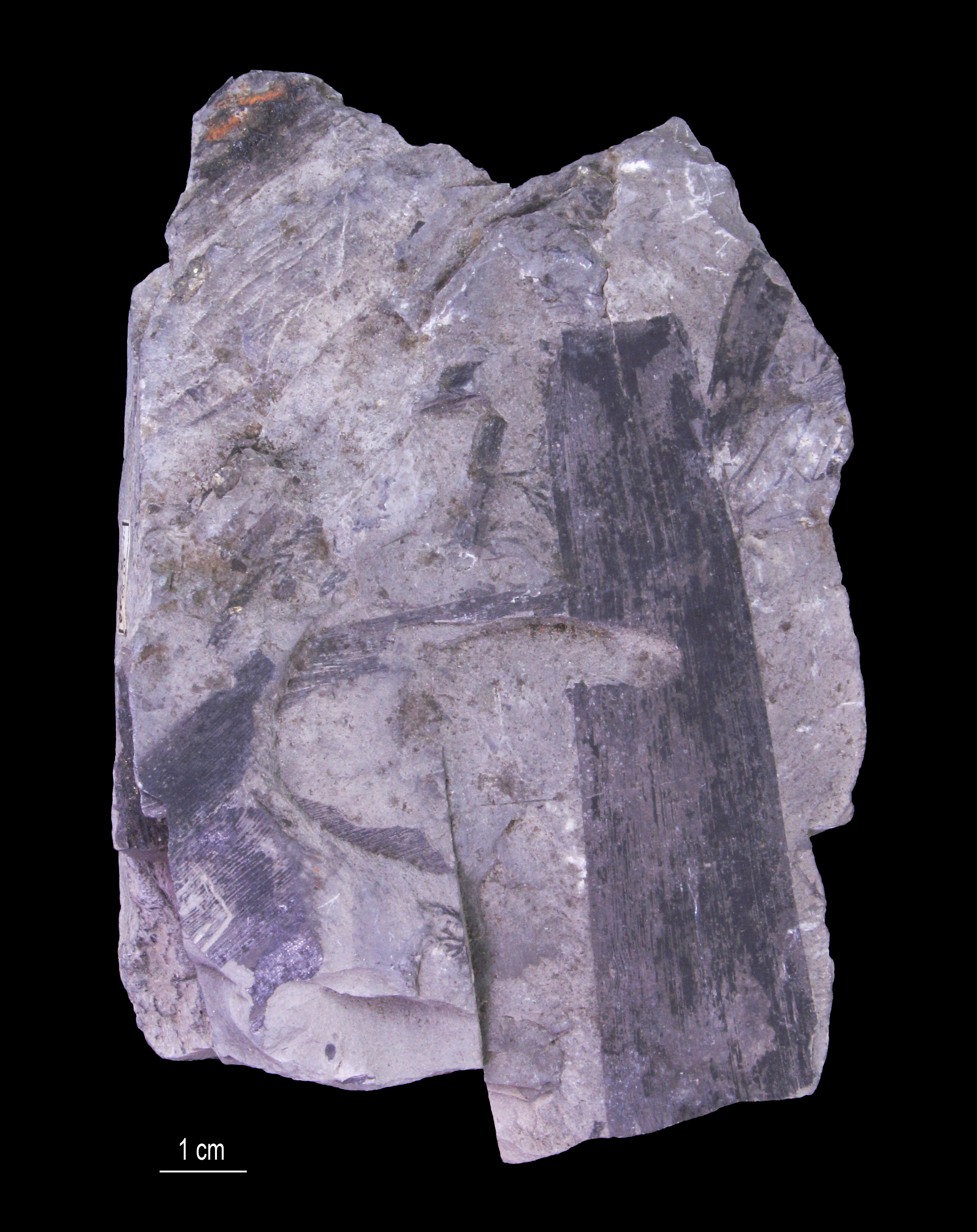
- Fossil bark of a Cordaites sp

Scientific classification
- Kingdom: Plantae
- Clade: Tracheophytes
- Clade: Gymnospermae
- Division: Pinophyta
- Class: Pinopsida
- Order: †Cordaitales
- Family: †Cordaitaceae

Genera
- †Cordaites; †Cordaicarpus; †Cardiocarpus; †Samaropsis

= Cordaitaceae =

Extinct family of conifers

Cordaitaceae is an extinct family of conifers. It was named after Czech botanist and mycologist August Carl Joseph Corda.

Conifers of this family were common in the Carboniferous and Permian periods.
