= Notoscyphus balticus =

Notoscyphus balticus Temporal range: Middle Eocene

Scientific classification
- Kingdom: Plantae
- Division: Marchantiophyta
- Class: Jungermanniopsida
- Order: Jungermanniales
- Family: Notoscyphaceae
- Genus: Notoscyphus
- Species: N. balticus

Binomial name
- Notoscyphus balticus Heinrichs et al, 2015

Extinct species of liverwort

Notoscyphus balticus is an extinct species of liverwort in the family Geocalycaceae. The species is solely known from the Middle Eocene Baltic amber deposits in the Baltic Sea region of Europe. The genus contains a total of thirteen extant species distributed across the northern hemisphere.

== History and classification ==
Notoscyphus balticus is known from a solitary fossil gametophyte shoot which is an inclusion in a transparent chunk of Baltic amber. The amber specimen also contains several Fagaceae hairs and some partially decomposed wood bits. When the fossil was described it was part of the amber collections housed in the Geological-Palaeontological Institute and Museum Hamburg. The amber was recovered from fossil bearing rocks in the Baltic Sea region of Europe. Estimates of the age date between 37 million years old, for the youngest sediments and 48 million years old. This age range straddles the middle Eocene, ranging from near the beginning of the Lutetian to the beginning of the Pribonian.

The holotype was first studied by a group of five researchers led by Jochen Heinrichs of LMU Munich. The research group's 2015 type description for the species was published in the paleobotany journal Review of Palaeobotany and Palynology. The specific epithet balticus was coined as a reference to the origin location for the amber.

== Description ==
The N. balticus specimen is a gametophyte shoot preserved from apex down to the rhizoids. Overall the gametophyte is 3.2 mm (0.13 in) long and 1.45 mm (0.057 in) at its widest. There are three bunches of rhizoids near the base of the shoot and growing to up to 3 mm (0.12 in) long. The rhizoids are unbranched and show a thin coating of fungal hyphae that possibly penetrate into the rhizoids. The leaves are attached to the stem in a succubous manner with the base of each leaf overlapping the leaf below it. The leaves are round in outline when they are small and as the size increases they become elliptic in overall outline. The leaves freely spread out from the stem and some curve upwards, while the underleaves are small to inconspicuous with an ovate to triangular shape.
