= Gymnocodium =

Gymnocodium Temporal range: Permian

Scientific classification
- Clade: Archaeplastida
- Division: Rhodophyta
- Class: incertae sedis
- Family: †Gymnocodiaceae
- Genus: †Gymnocodium; Pia, 1920

Type species
- Gyroporella bellerophontis Rothpletz, 1894

Extinct genus of algae

Gymnocoidum is a genus of calcareous alga known from Permian strata. For details of its classification, see Gymnocodiaceae.
