= Samaropsis =

Samaropsis Temporal range: 359.2–199 Ma

Scientific classification
- Kingdom: Plantae
- Clade: Tracheophytes
- Clade: Gymnospermae
- Division: Pinophyta
- Class: Pinopsida
- Order: †Cordaitales
- Family: †Cordaitaceae
- Genus: †Samaropsis; Goeppert, 1864

Species
- S. dolianitii; S. gigas; S. indica; S. intermedia; S. itapevensis; S. kurtzii; S. leslii; S. mendesii; S. millaniana; S. milleri; S. puerca; S. rigbyi; S. seixasi; S. shenii

Extinct genus of conifers

Samaropsis is a form genus named by Goeppert in 1864. Later Sewart (1917) redefined the taxon to refer only to the seeds.

== Location ==
In Brazil, the fossil species S. gigas, S. kurtzii, S. millaniana, S. rigbyi and S. seixasi, have been recovered from the city of Mariana Pimentel, in the state of Rio Grande do Sul. The fossils are found in the Morro Papaléo outcrop, Rio Bonito Formation and date from the Sakmarian stage in the Permian. Located in the geopark Paleorrota.
