= Icacinicaryites =

Icacinicaryites Temporal range: Paleocene ~66–56 Ma

Scientific classification
- Kingdom: Plantae
- Clade: Tracheophytes
- Clade: Angiosperms
- Clade: Eudicots
- Clade: Asterids
- Order: Icacinales
- Family: Icacinaceae
- Tribe: Iodeae
- Genus: †Icacinicaryites; Pigg, Manchester, and Devore 2008

Species
- I. corruga I. israelii I. lichensis I. lotii

Extinct genus of flowering plants

Icacinicaryites is an extinct genus of flowering plant belonging to the order Icacinales and family Icacinaceae. Specimens have been found Paleocene beds in the Western Interior of North America and in the Paris Basin.

The taxonomy of I. israelii is disputed.
