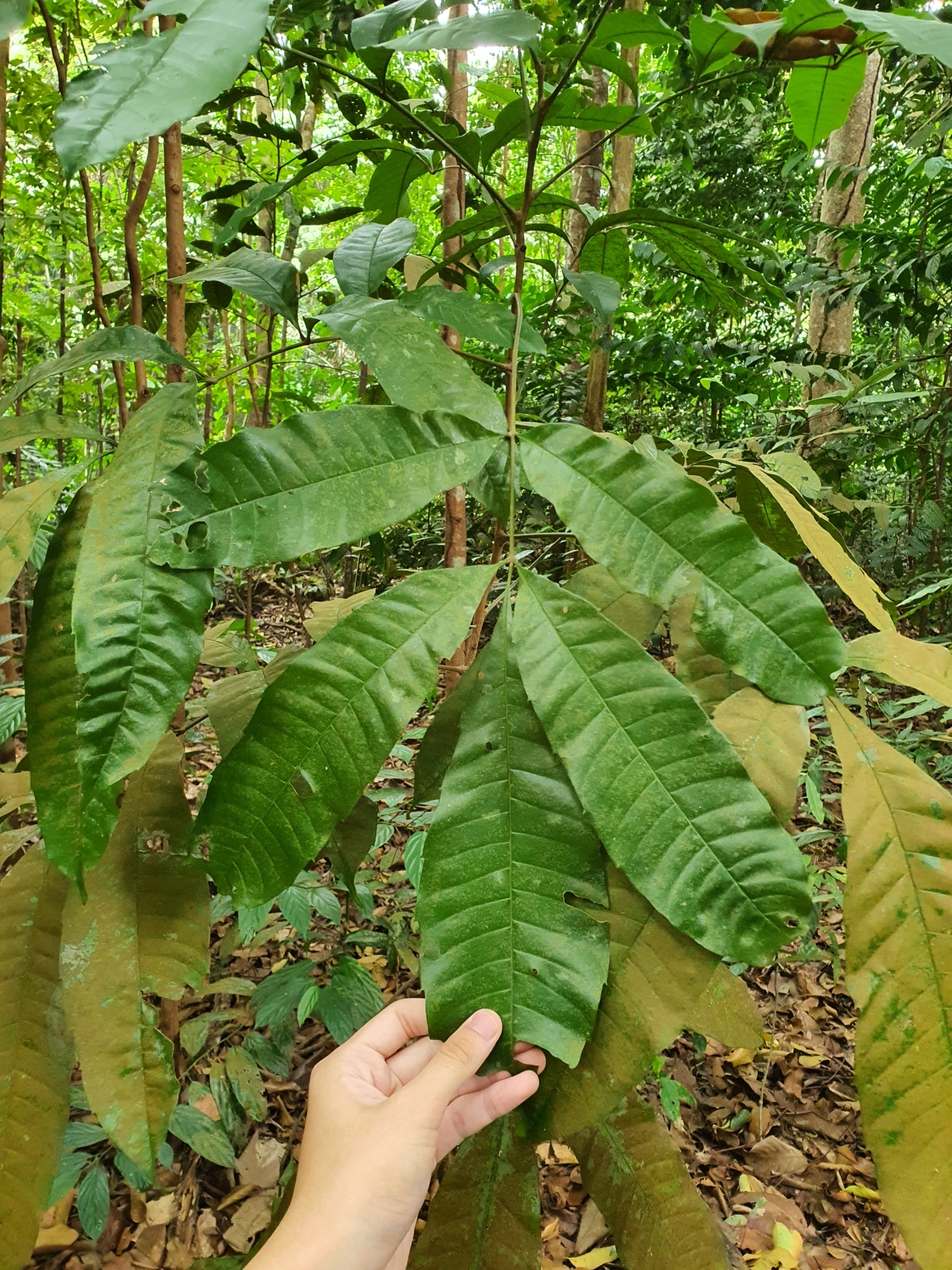
- Paranephelium macrophyllum in Singapore

Scientific classification
- Kingdom: Plantae
- Clade: Tracheophytes
- Clade: Angiosperms
- Clade: Eudicots
- Clade: Rosids
- Order: Sapindales
- Family: Sapindaceae
- Subfamily: Sapindoideae
- Genus: Paranephelium; Miq.

Synonyms
- Mildea Miq.; Scyphopetalum Hiern

= Paranephelium =

Genus of trees

Paranephelium is a genus of Asian small trees in family Sapindaceae, subfamily Sapindoideae.

== Species ==
Plants of the World Online and the Catalogue of Life list the following:

- Paranephelium hainanense H.S. Lo
- Paranephelium hystrix W.W.Sm.
- Paranephelium joannis M. Davids
- Paranephelium macrophyllum King
- Paranephelium spirei Lecomte
- Paranephelium xestophyllum Miq.
