= Tupuangi Formation =

Geological formation in New Zealand

- Stratigraphic range: Cenomanian-Turonian; ~99–89 Ma
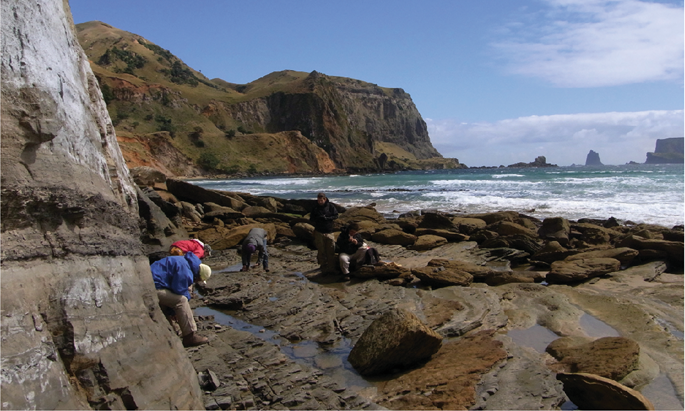
- Tupuangi Formation at Waihere bay, Pitt Island
- Type: Geological formation
- Unit of: Waihere Bay Group
- Sub-units: Kokowai Allomember, Waihere Allomember, Morgan's Hollow Allomember
- Underlies: Kahuitara Tuff
- Overlies: Unseen
- Thickness: Not bounded, 430 m (1,410 ft) exposed onshore, possibly 700 m (2,300 ft) offshore

Lithology
- Primary: Sandstone, siltstone
- Other: Conglomerate

Location
- Region: Oceania
- Country: New Zealand
- Extent: Pitt Island, Chatham Islands

Type section
- Named for: Tupuangi, Pitt Island
- Location: Northern end of Waihere Bay
- Coordinates: 44°15′32.8″S 176°14′57.1″W
- Approximate paleocoordinates: 78.9°S 135.9°W
- Thickness at type section: ~400 m (1,300 ft)
- Tupuangi Formation (Oceania)

The Tupuangi Formation is a geological formation in New Zealand, only exposed on Pitt Island in the Chatham Islands. It is the oldest exposed sedimentary unit within the archipelago. It was deposited in terrestrial deltaic to paralic conditions during the Cenomanian to Turonian ages of the Late Cretaceous. During this time period the Chatham Islands were attached to Antarctica within the Antarctic Circle, at approximately 70° to 80° south.

== Description ==
The lithology consists of a basal conglomerate, which grades into sandstone and carbonaceous siltstone in the upper part of the formation. The formation is notable for its fossil content, including many varieties of plant, including abundant conifers, including members of Araucariaceae, Podocarpaceae, Cupressaceae, Cheirolepidiaceae, as well as Ginkgo and Ginkgoites. Other flora includes mosses, ferns, liverworts and lycopodians. Compression fossils of insects have been found including members of Carabidae and Buprestidae, and acritarch Introvertocystis. Amber is also known from the deposit associated with the conifer Protodammara reimatamoriori, a member of Cupressaceae.

== See also ==
- Stratigraphy of New Zealand
- South Polar region of the Cretaceous
