= Bakhar Formation =

Geological formation in Mongolia

- Stratigraphic range: Aalenian-Bathonian; ~174–166 Ma
- Type: Geological formation

Lithology
- Primary: Claystone
- Other: Coal

Location
- Coordinates: 44.9°N 100.9°E
- Approximate paleocoordinates: 48.1°N 105.2°E
- Country: Mongolia
- Extent: North Molasse Basin
- Bakhar Formation (Mongolia)

The Bakhar Formation (Russian: Bakhar Svita) is a geological formation in Mongolia whose strata date back to the Aalenian to Bathonian stages of the Middle Jurassic, comprising claystones deposited in a lacustrine environment.

== Fossil content ==
Insects; Platyperla propera, Ano da, A. net, A. nym, Blattula anuniversala, B. bacharensis, B. flamma, B. mikro, B. mini, B. universala, B. velika, B. vulgara, Caloblattina vremeni, Dostavba pre, Hra disko, H. bavi, H. nie, Nuurcala cela, Okras sarko, Perlucipecta cosmopolitana, Polliciblattula analis, P. tatosanerata, P. vana, Praeblattella jurassica, Raphidiomima chimnata, R. krajka, Rhipidoblattina bakharensis, R. konserva, R. sisnerahkab, Solemnia togokhudukhensis, Truhla vekov, fish (Palaeonisciformes) and pterosaur remains of the family Anurognathidae have been recovered from the formation. The formation has also provided many fossil flora in its coal layers, known as the Tsagan-Ovoo Flora containing 32 megafossil plant taxa belonging to horsetails, ferns, cycadaleans, ginkgoaleans, leptostrobaleans, conifers and gymnosperms. Three new species were named; Ginkgo badamgaravii, Pseudotorellia gobiense and P. mongolica.

== See also ==
- List of pterosaur-bearing stratigraphic units
- Balabansai Formation, contemporaneous fossiliferous formation of Central Asia
- Itat Formation, contemporaneous fossiliferous formation of Russia
- Ukureyskaya Formation, contemporaneous fossiliferous formation of Russia
- Tiaojishan Formation, contemporaneous fossiliferous formation of China
