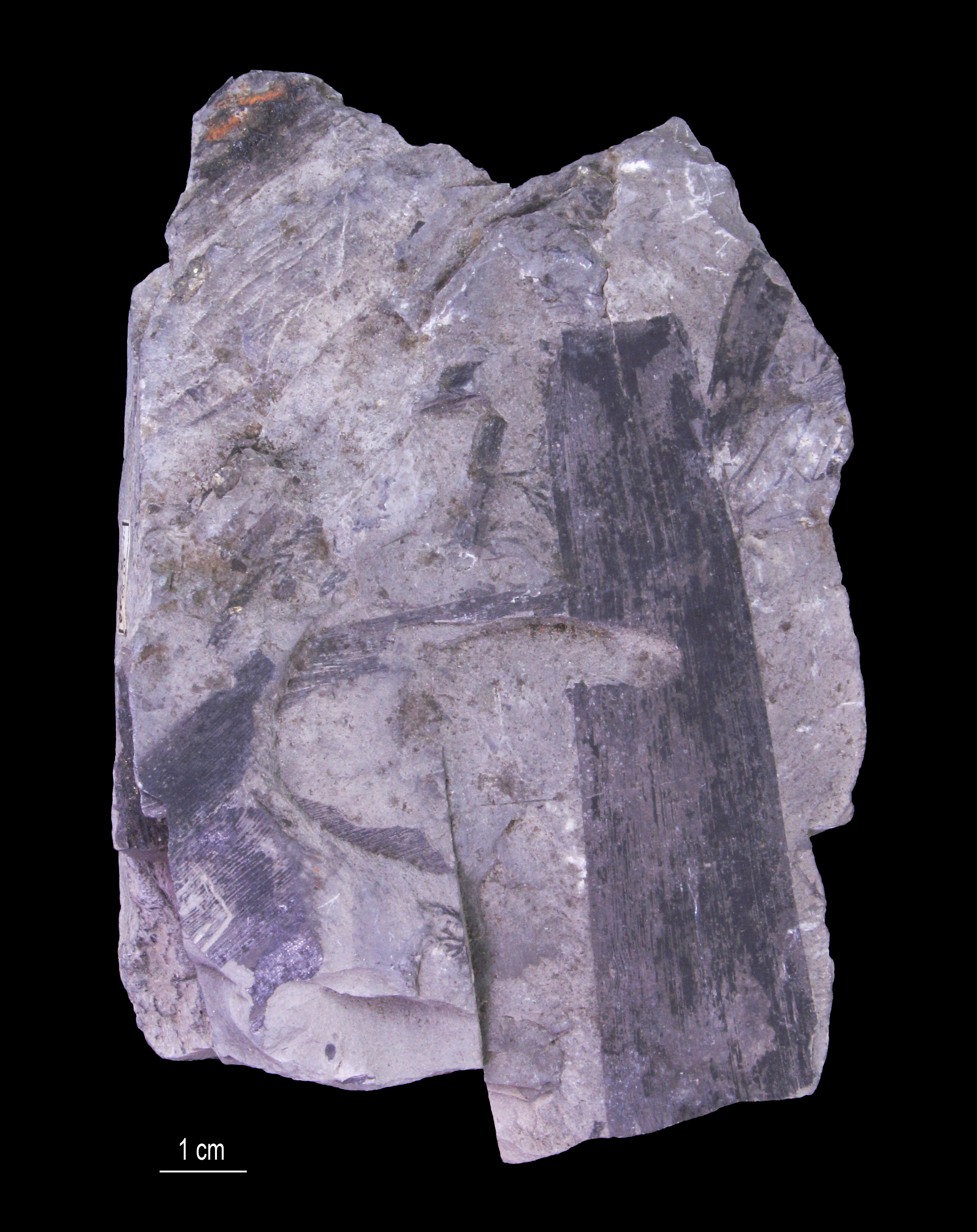
- Fossil bark of a Cordaites sp

Scientific classification
- Kingdom: Plantae
- Clade: Embryophytes
- Clade: Tracheophytes
- Clade: Spermatophytes
- Clade: Gymnosperms
- Division: Pinophyta
- Class: Pinopsida
- Order: †Cordaitales

Families
- †Cordaitaceae

= Cordaitales =

Cordaitales Temporal range: Carboniferous–Permian

Extinct order of conifers

Cordaitales are an extinct order of gymnosperms, known from the early Carboniferous to the late Permian. Many Cordaitales had elongated strap-like leaves, resembling some modern-day conifers of the Araucariaceae and Podocarpaceae. They had cone-like reproductive structures reminiscent of those of modern conifers. Some Cordaitales formed large trees that seem to have been particularly abundant on drier ground, in tropical environments. Also, some tall trees but also shrubby and mangrove-like species of Cordaitales seem to have grown in the Carboniferous coal swamps. Cordaitales were also abundant during the Permian. Common genera from the Carboniferous include Mesoxylon and Cordaixylon. Other genera are Noeggerathiopsis and Samaropsis.

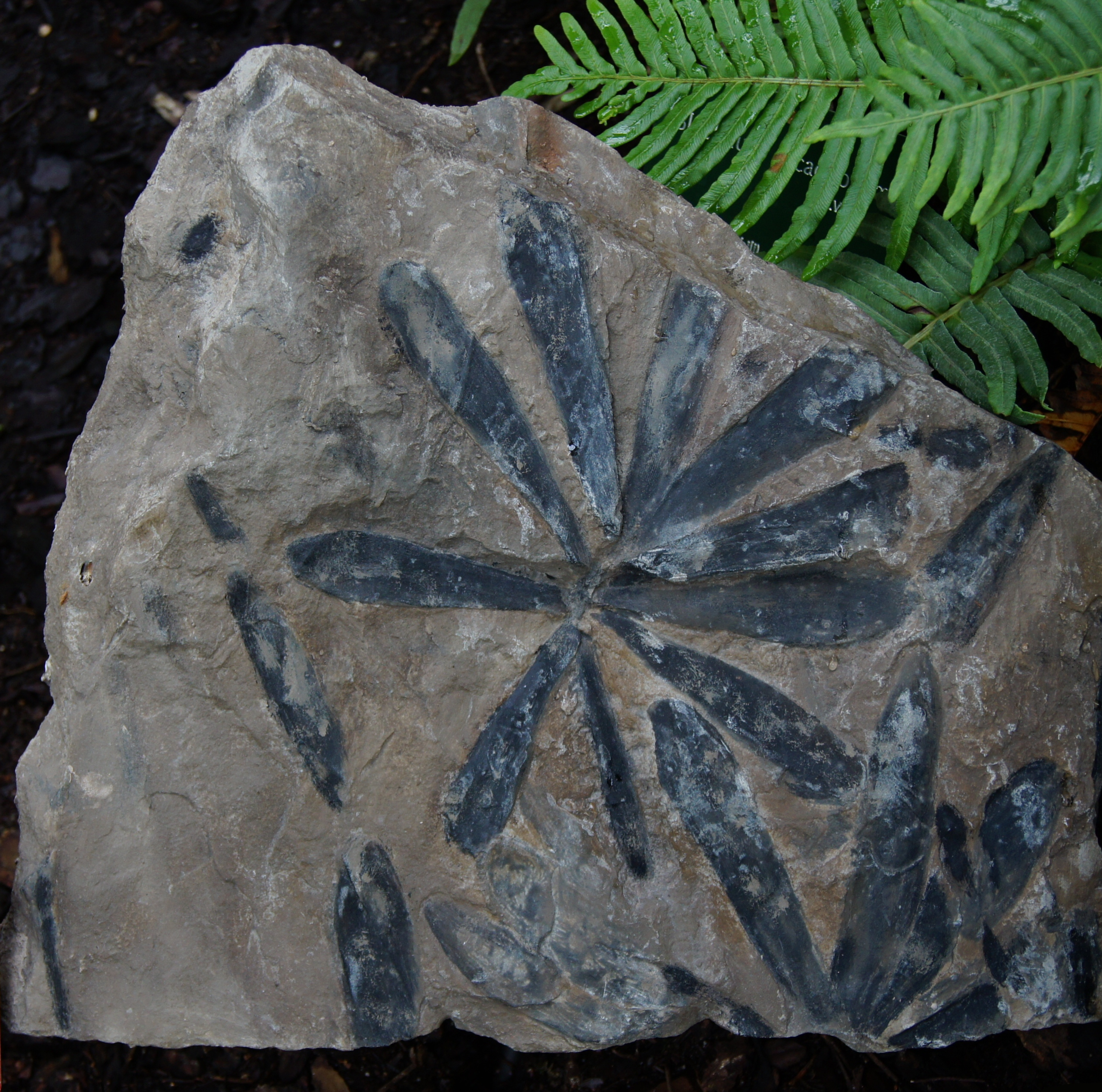
Cordaites lungatus

Features of the female cone (megastrobilus) of the members of Cordaitales indicate that the cone scales, possessed by themselves and their descendants, may correspond to short shoots, rather than leaves. This is because the cone consists of these short shoots, emerging from bracts. Among conifers, a leaf of any kind does not emerge from the axil of a bract.
