= Adiantitophyllum =

Adiantitophyllum Temporal range: Late Albian

Scientific classification
- Kingdom: Plantae
- Class: Polypodiopsida
- Genus: Adiantitophyllum
- Species: A.serratum

Binomial name
- Adiantitophyllum serratum Nagalingum & Cantrill, 2015

Extinct genus of ferns

Adiantitophyllum is a genus of extinct fern known from the lower Cretaceous of Antarctica. It is a monotypic genus with one species, A.serratum.

== Discovery and naming ==
Adiantitophyllum was found on Alexander Island. The holotype KG. 4671.16 along with seventeen other specimens were collected.

The genus name is made up of adantio which is named after Adantites due to its similarity and phyllum which is greek for plant. The specific epithet is serratum which is an inflection of serratus which is latin for serrated.

== Description ==
Adiantitophyllum can be distinguished from other species with acute apex pinnules, serrated leave edges, and the bases of the leaves tapering to the petiole.
