= Gymnocodiaceae =

Gymnocodiaceae Temporal range: Permian–Cretaceous

Scientific classification
- Clade: Archaeplastida
- Division: Rhodophyta
- Class: incertae sedis
- Family: †Gymnocodiaceae; G. F. Elliott, 1955

Extinct family of algae

This family of alga is known from Permian to Cretaceous strata. It has been aligned with the chlorophytes and rhodophytes; whilst the latter is the most widely held opinion, some authors still consider a green algal affinity possible.
