= Geology of Armenia =

Geology of the country of Armenia

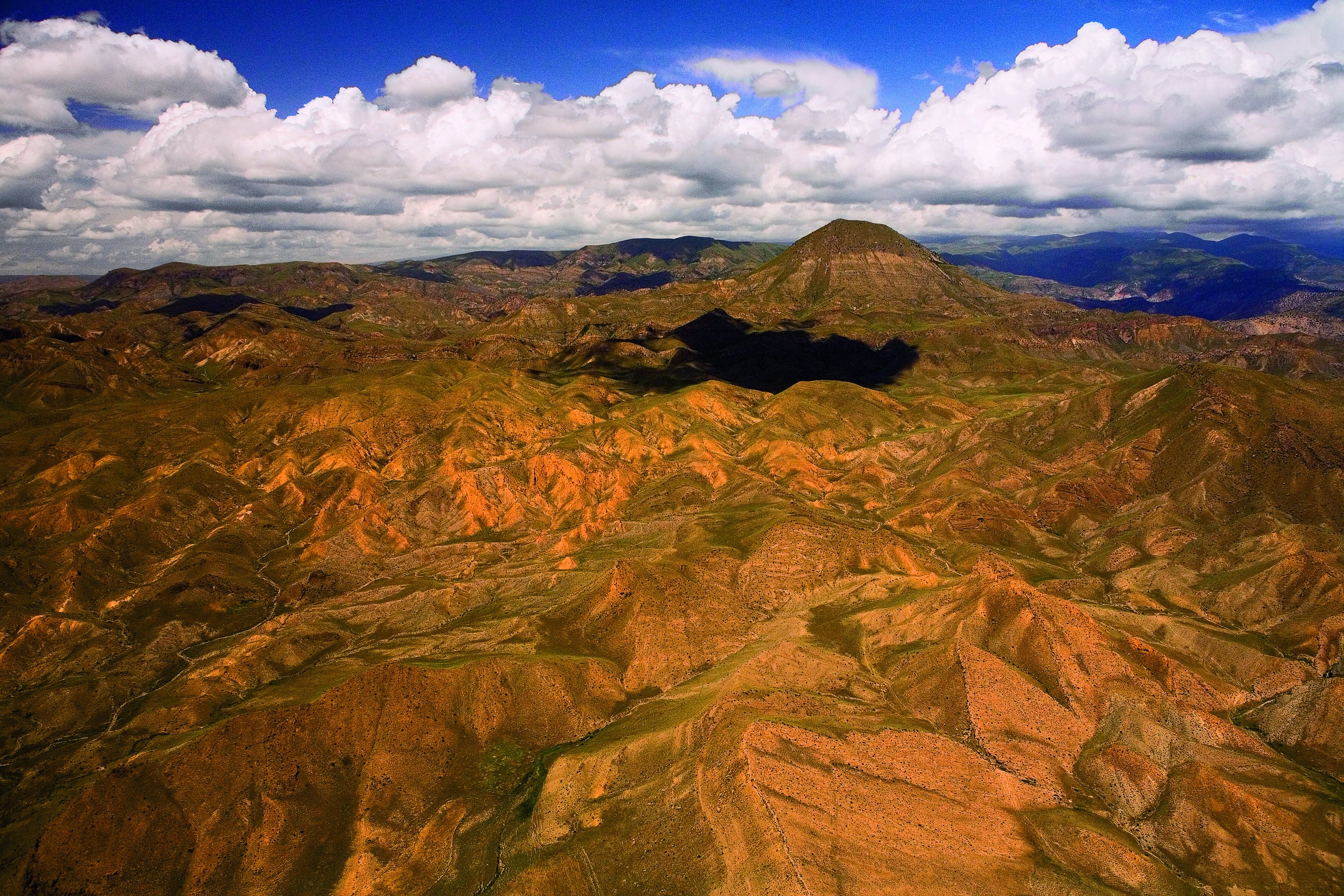
Gegham mountains

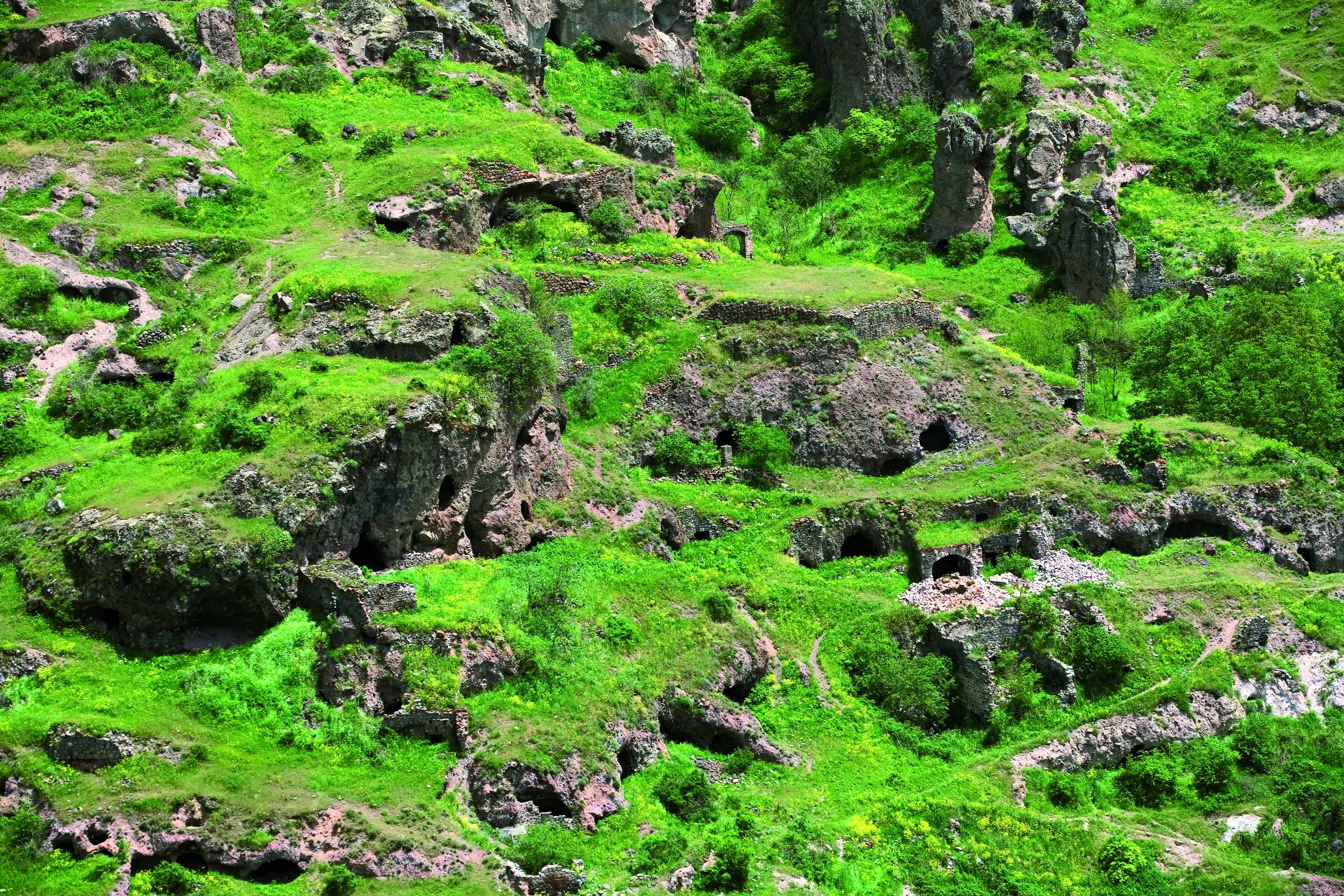
Caves of Tegh, Armenia ("Cave City")

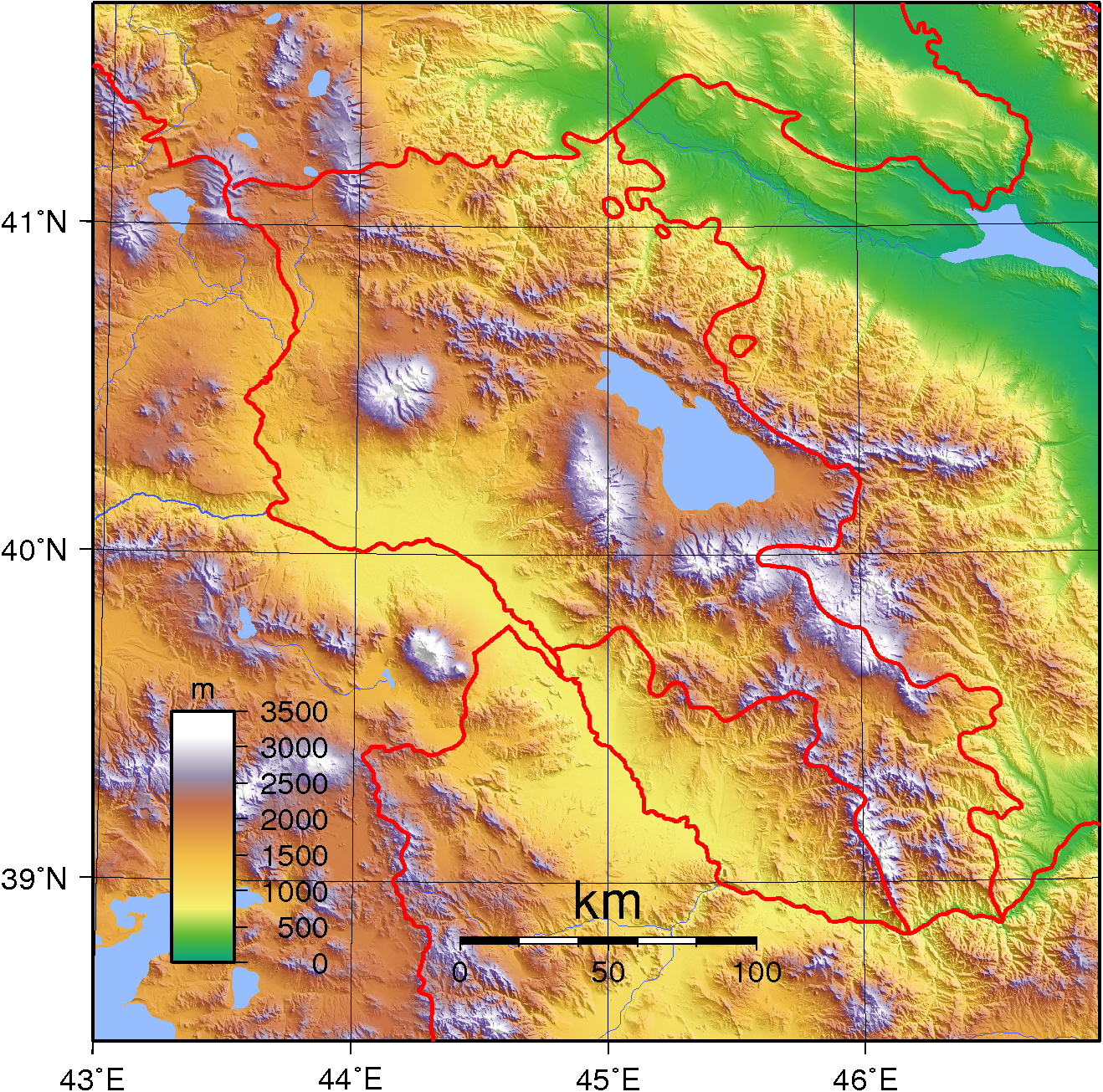
Topography of Armenia

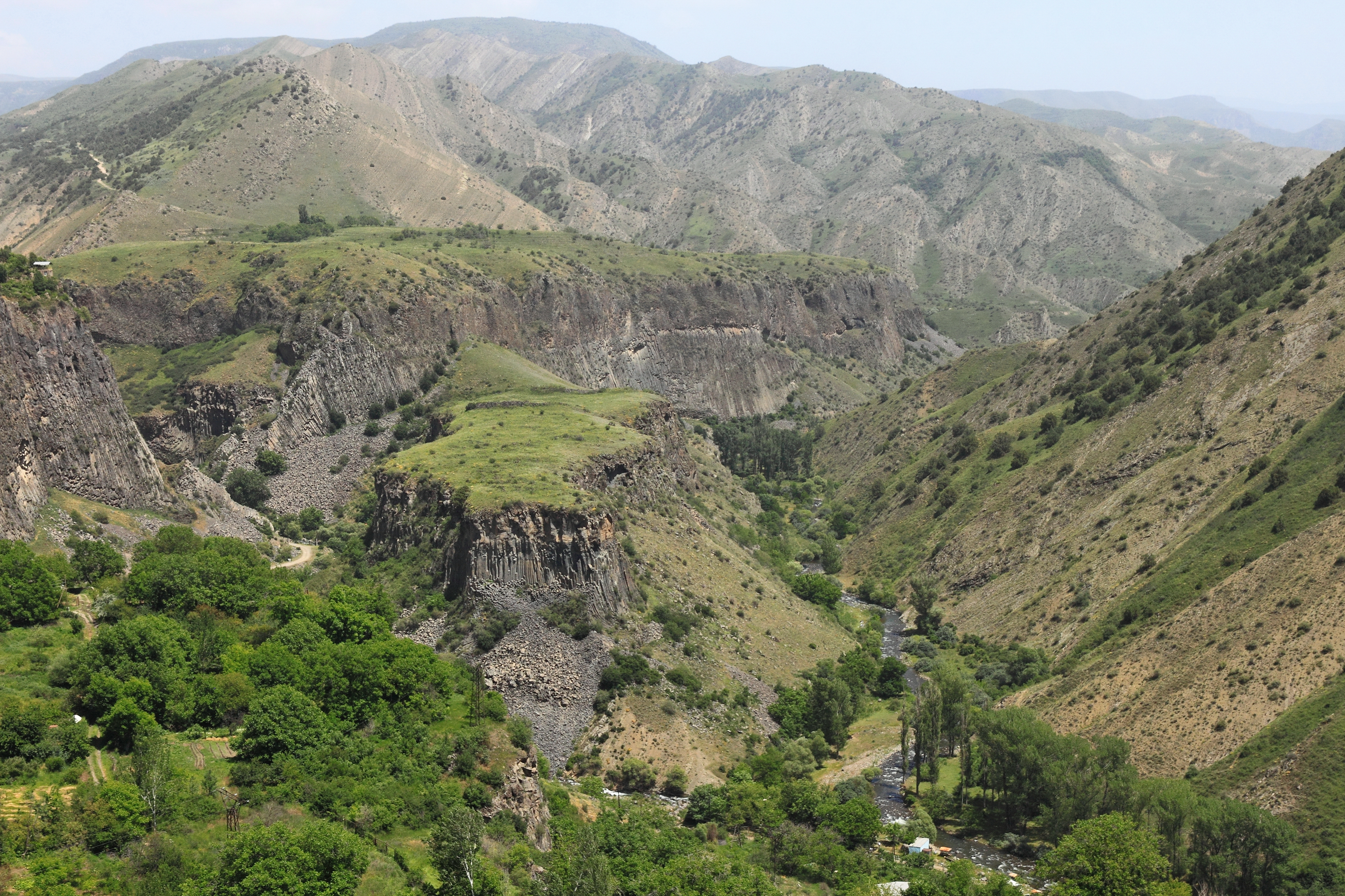
Garni Gorge

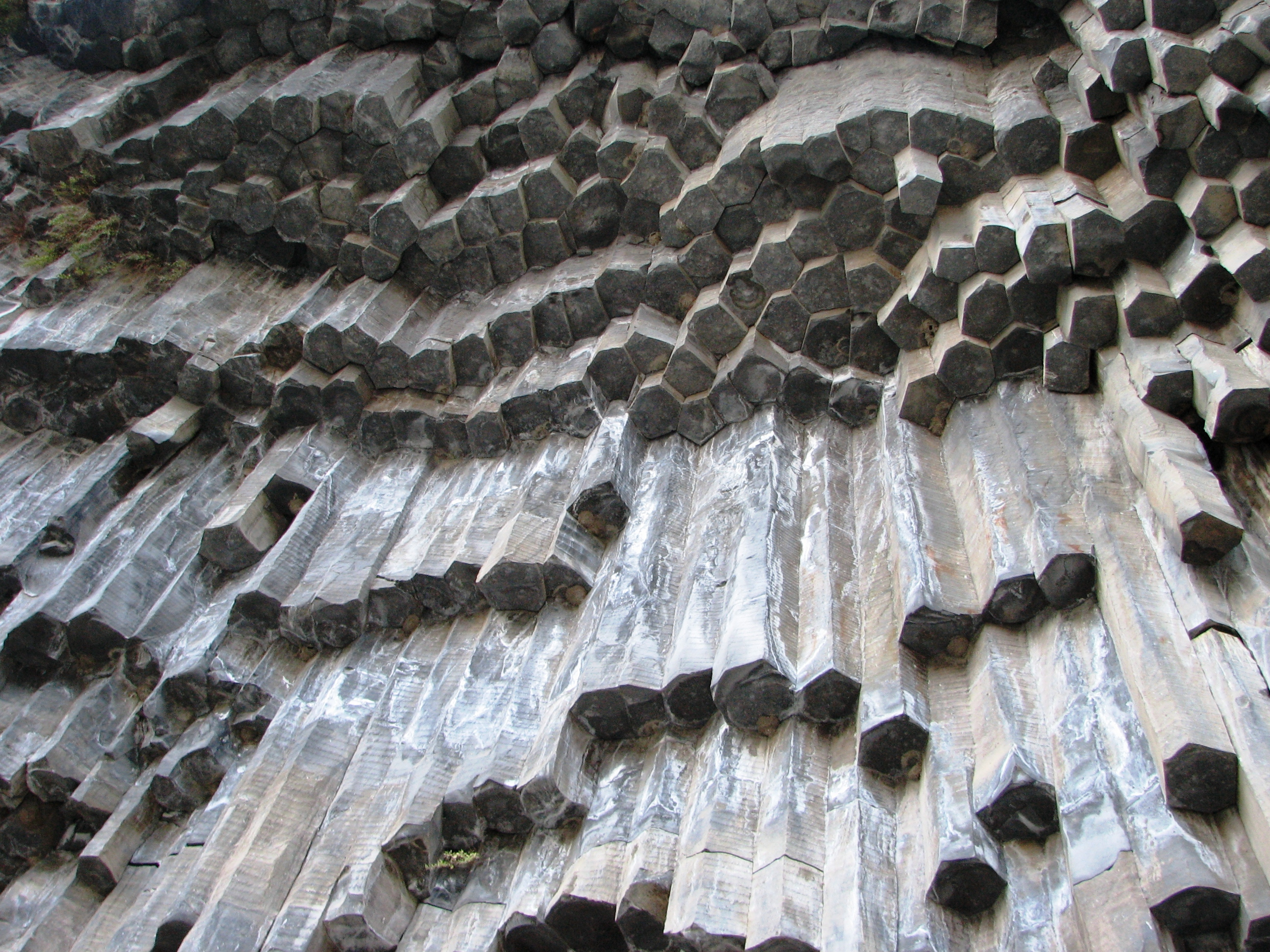
Columnar jointing at Garni Gorge

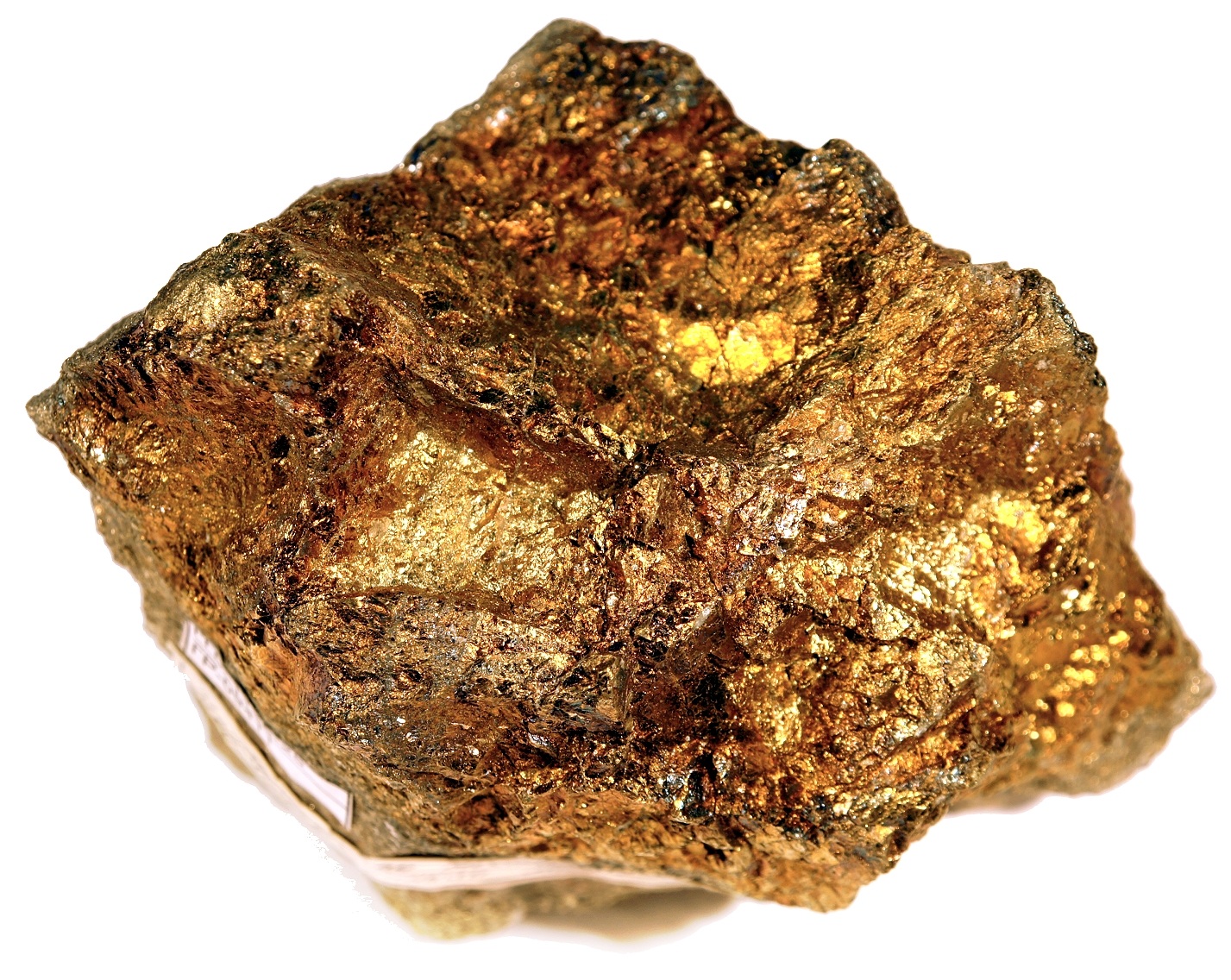
Chalcopyrite ore from the deposit at Shamlugh in Armenia. From the collection of the Vernadsky State Geological Museum in Moscow, Russia

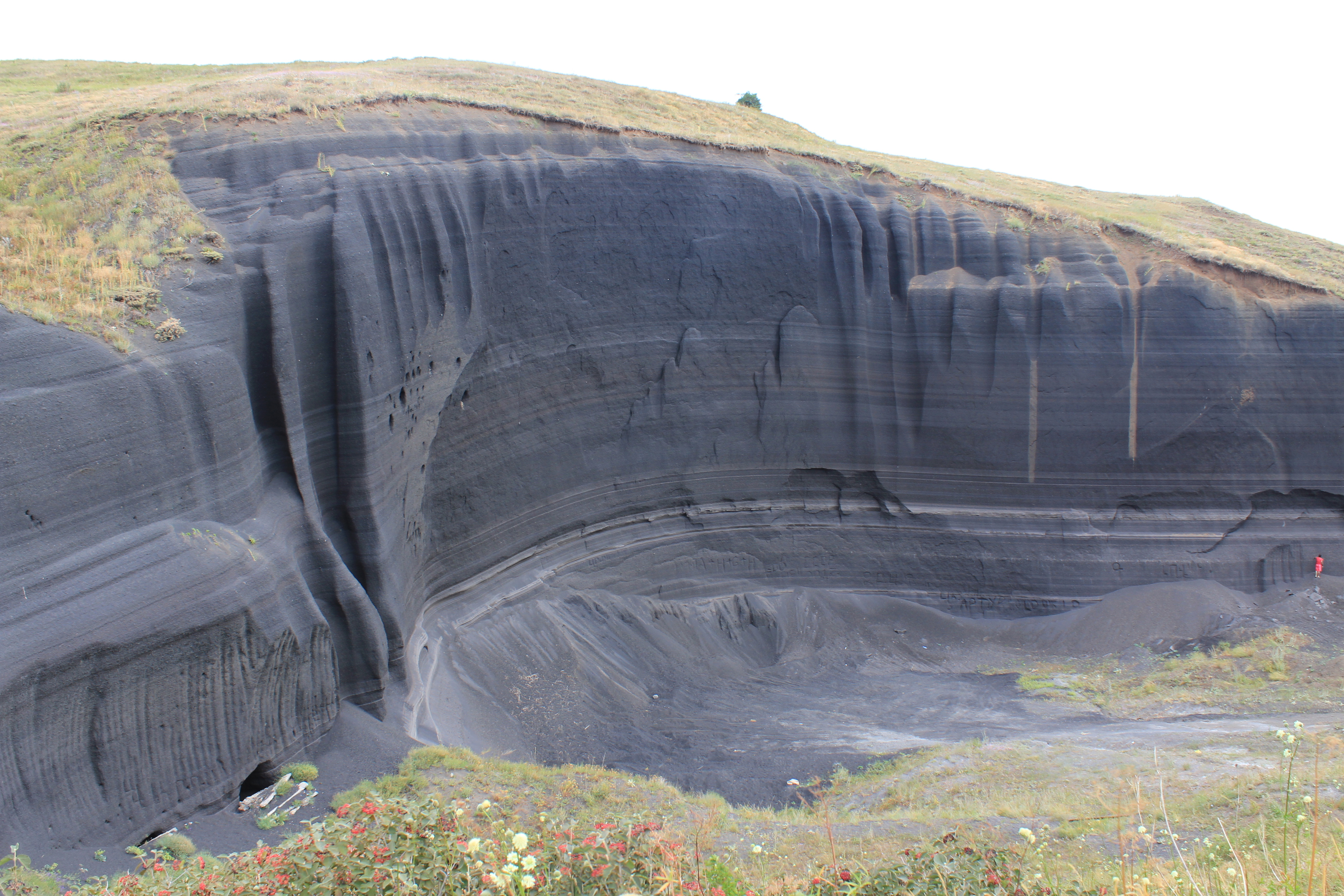
Lava in Gutanasar mountain range

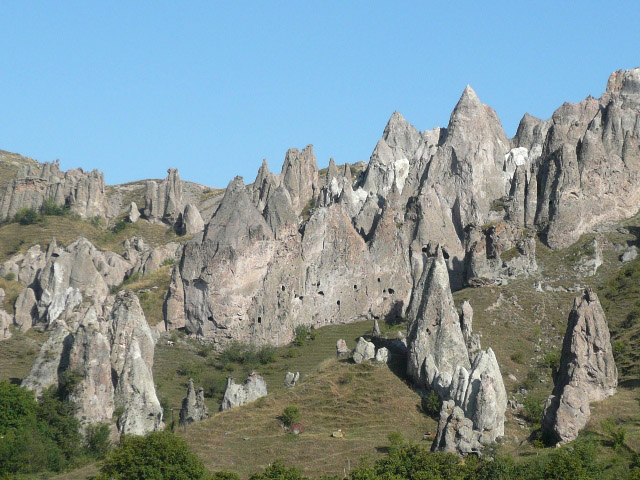
"Old Goris" rock formation in Armenia

The geology of Armenia was shaped by geological upheaval that pushed up the Earth's crust to form the Armenian plateau 25 million years ago. This created the complex topography of Armenia.

The Lesser Caucasus range extends through northern Armenia, runs southeast between Lake Sevan and Azerbaijan, then passes roughly along the Armenian-Azerbaijani border to Iran. Thus situated, the mountains make travel from north to south difficult.

== Earthquakes ==
Geological turmoil continues in the form of devastating earthquakes. In a December 1988 earthquake, the second largest city in the republic, Gyumri (then called Leninakan), was heavily damaged by a massive quake that killed more than 25,000 people.

== Terrain ==
About half of Armenia's area of approximately 29,800 km^{2} (11,505.8 sq mi) has an elevation of at least 2,000 m (6,562 ft), and only 3% of the country lies below 650 m (2,133 ft). The lowest points are in the valleys of the Araks River and the Debet River in the far north, which have elevations of 380 and 430 m (1,247 and 1,411 ft), respectively. Elevations in the Lesser Caucasus vary between 2,640 and 3,280 m (8,661 and 10,761 ft). To the southwest of the range is the Armenian Plateau, which slopes southwestward toward the Araks River on the Turkish border. The plateau is masked by intermediate mountain ranges and extinct volcanoes. The largest of these, Mount Aragats, 4,095 meters (13,435 ft) high, is also the highest point in Armenia. Most of the population lives in the western and northwestern parts of the country, where the two major cities, Yerevan and Gyumri (previously called Aleksandropol during the Soviet period), are located.

The valleys of the Debet River and Akstafa River as they pass through mountain areas form the chief routes into Armenia from the north. Lake Sevan is by far the largest lake at 72.5 km (45 mi) across at its widest point and 376 km (233.6 mi) long. It lies 2,070 m (6,791 ft) above sea level on the plateau.

Armenia's terrain is most rugged in the extreme southeast, which is drained by the Bargushat River and most moderate in the Araks River valley to the extreme southwest. Most of Armenia is drained by the Araks or its tributary, the Hrazdan, which flow from Lake Sevan. The Araks forms most of Armenia's border with Turkey and Iran, while the Zangezur Mountains form the border between Armenia's southern province of Syunik and Azerbaijan's adjacent Nakhchivan autonomous region.

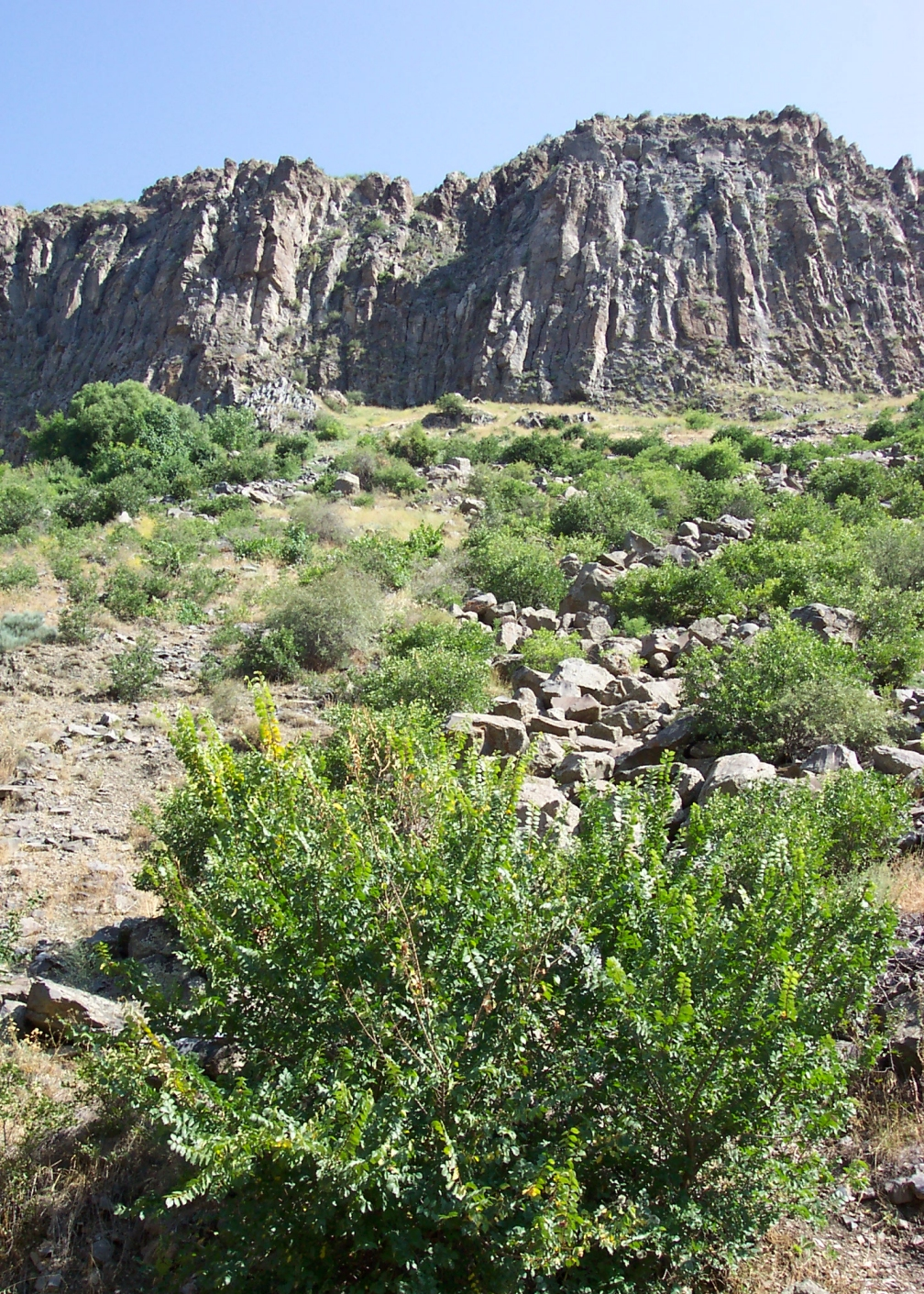
Armenian terrain

=== Volcanic mountains ===
Volcanic mountains in Armenia include Mount Ara, Mount Aragats, Azhdahak, Ghegam Ridge, Mount of Armenia. Porak. Arpi Gorge and Garni Gorge contain columnar igneous rocks (Columnar jointing).

== Mining ==
Mines in Armenia include Kajaran Mine and Teghut Mine. Both are open pit mines for copper and molybdenum.

== Fossils ==
Group or Formation	Period	Notes
Akhura Formation	Permian	
Ali Bashi Formation	Permian	
Arpinskaya Formation	Permian	
Dzhulfa Formation	Permian	
Gnishik Formation	Permian	
Gundara Formation	Permian	
Julfa Formation	Permian	
Karabaglyar Formation	Triassic	
Khachik Formation	Permian	

== See also ==
- Climate of Armenia
- Geography of Armenia
- Geology of Europe
- Regions of Armenia
