= List of fossiliferous stratigraphic units in Armenia =

Fossiliferous stratigraphic units in Armenia
Karabaglyar Formation
Ali Bashi Formation
Akhura Formation
Dzhulfa Formation
Julfa Formation
Khachik Formation
Arpinskaya Formation
Gnishik Formation

This is a list of fossiliferous stratigraphic units in Armenia.

== List of fossiliferous stratigraphic units ==
| Formation | Period | Notes |
|---|---|---|
| Karabaglyar Formation | Induan | |
| Karabaglyar Formation | Changhsingian | |
| Ali Bashi Formation | Changhsingian | |
| Akhura Formation | Changhsingian | |
| Akhura Formation | Wuchiapingian | |
| Dzhulfa Formation | Wuchiapingian | |
| Julfa Formation | Wuchiapingian | |
| Khachik Formation | Wuchiapingian | |
| Khachik Formation | Capitanian | |
| Arpinskaya Formation | Wordian-Capitanian | |
| Gnishik Formation | Wordian | |
| Arpa Formation | Wordian | |

== See also ==
- Geology of Armenia
- List of fossiliferous stratigraphic units in Azerbaijan
- List of fossiliferous stratigraphic units in Georgia
- List of fossiliferous stratigraphic units in Russia
- List of fossiliferous stratigraphic units in Turkey
