= List of fossiliferous stratigraphic units in Azerbaijan =

This is a list of fossiliferous stratigraphic units in Azerbaijan.

== List of fossiliferous stratigraphic units ==
Formation	Period	Notes
Maikop Group	Burdigalian	
Maikop Group	Aquitanian	
Maikop Group	Chattian	
Maikop Group	Rupelian	
Pshekha Horizon Formation	Rupelian	
Koun Formation	Priabonian	
Kemchi or Kemshidag Formation	Turonian	
Kemchi or Kemshidag Formation	Turonian	
Alty-Agach Formation	Albian	
Kyulyuli Formation	Albian	
Elikah Formation	Changhsingian-Induan	
Karabaglyar Formation	Changhsingian-Induan	
Karabaglyar Formation	Changhsingian	
Ali Bashi Formation	Changhsingian	
Akhura Formation	Changhsingian	
Akhura Formation	Wuchiapingian	
Chanakhchin Formation	Wuchiapingian	
Dzhulfa Formation	Wuchiapingian	
Julfa Formation	Wuchiapingian	
Khachik Formation	Wuchiapingian	
Khachik Formation	Capitanian	
Arpinskaya Formation	Wordian-Capitanian	
Gnishik Formation	Wordian	
Arpa Formation	Wordian	

== See also ==
- Lists of fossiliferous stratigraphic units in Europe
  - List of fossiliferous stratigraphic units in Armenia
  - List of fossiliferous stratigraphic units in Georgia
  - List of fossiliferous stratigraphic units in Russia
  - List of fossiliferous stratigraphic units in Turkey
- Lists of fossiliferous stratigraphic units in Asia
