= Batylykh Formation =

Geological formation in Yakutia, Russia

- Stratigraphic range: Early Cretaceous ?Berriasian–Barremian
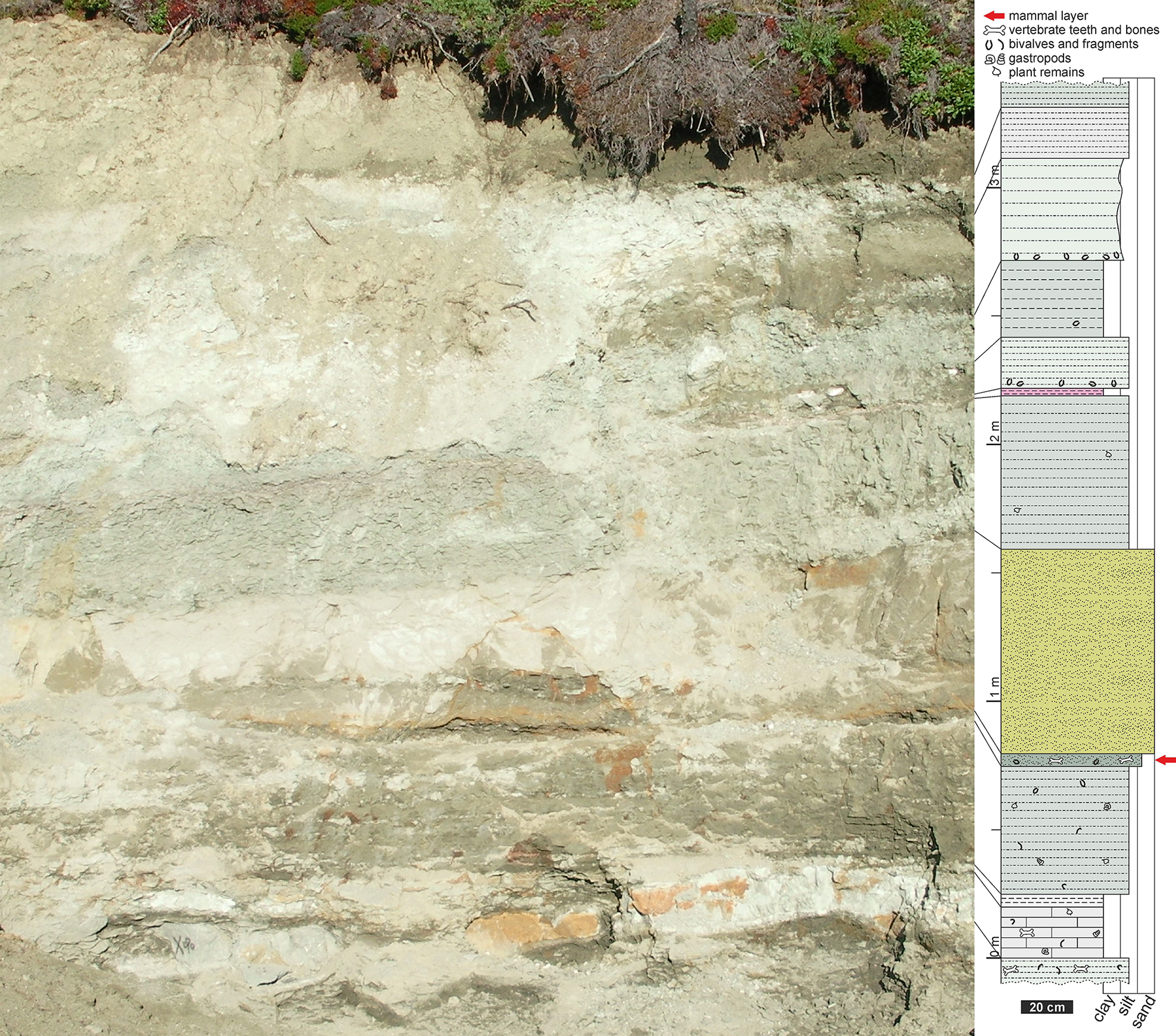
- Teete locality with stratigraphic column
- Type: Geological formation
- Unit of: Sangar Series
- Underlies: Eksenyakh Formation

Lithology
- Primary: Claystone, siltstone, sandstone

Location
- Coordinates: 62.7°N 117.6°E
- Approximate paleocoordinates: 66.5°N 110.1°E
- Region: Yakutia
- Country: Russia
- Extent: Vilyuy River Basin
- Batylykh Formation (Russia)

The Batylykh Formation is a geological formation in Yakutia, Russia. It is of an uncertain Early Cretaceous age, probably dating between the Berriasian and the Barremian. It is the oldest unit of the 1,500 metres (4,900 ft) thick Sangar Series within the Vilyuy syneclise. The mudstones, sandstones and shales of the formation were deposited in a fluvial to lacustrine environment.

== Fossil content ==
The formation is best known for the Teete locality, which has revealed remains of numerous vertebrates, including dinosaurs and mammals.

Fossils recovered from the formation include:

Mammaliaformes

- Cryoharamiya tarda
- Khorotherium yakutensis
- Sangarotherium aquilonium
- Xenocretosuchus kolossovi
- Gobiconodon sp.
- cf. Sineleutherus sp.
- Docodonta indet.
- Tritylodontidae indet.

Reptiles

- Khurendukhosaurus sp.
- Ankylosauria indet.
- Coelurosauria indet.
- Euhelopodidae
- Lacertilia indet.
- Macronaria indet.
- Mesochelydia indet.
- Reptilia indet.
- Stegosauria indet.
- Theropoda indet.

Amphibians

- Kulgeriherpeton ultimus
- Anura indet.
- Caudata indet.

Fish

- Chondrostei indet.
- Palaeoniscidae indet.

Insects

- Crenoptychoptera gronskayae
- Zhiganka comitans

Bivalves

- Bivalvia indet.

Gastropods

- Gastropoda indet.

Flora

- Podocarpus multesima
- Selaginella velata
- Stereisporites compactus
- S. congregatus
- Tripartina variabilis
- Ginkgocycadophytus sp.
- Klukisporites sp.
- Leiotriletes sp.
- Ophioglossum sp.
- Piceapollenites sp.
- Picea sp.
- Pinus sp.
- Podocarpus sp.
- Selaginella sp.
- Stereisporites sp.
- Pinaceae indet.

== Gallery ==
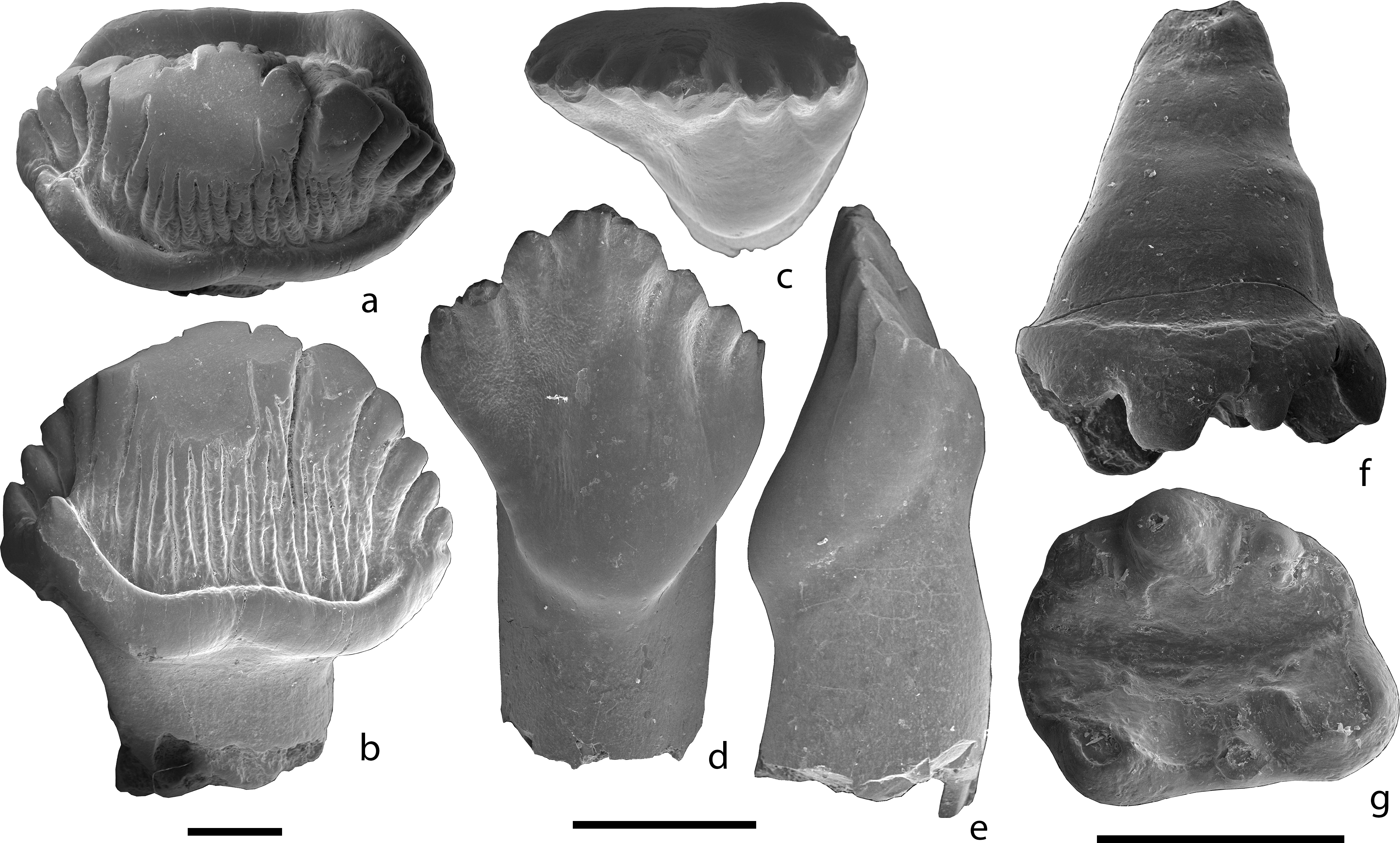
Dinosaur teeth

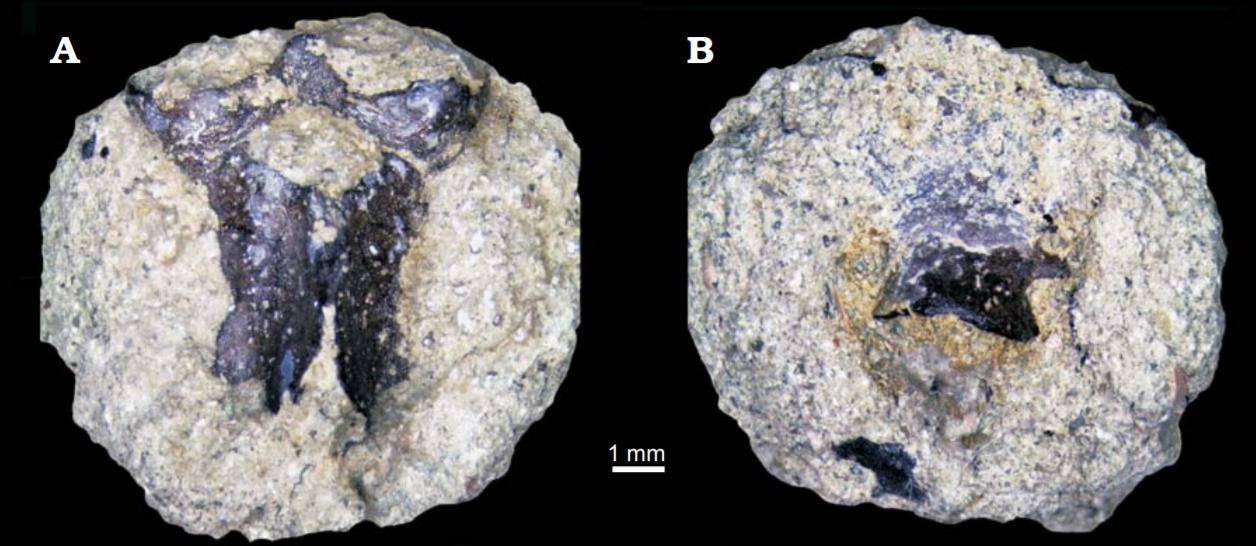
Kulgeriherpeton ultimum

== See also ==
- List of fossiliferous stratigraphic units in Russia
- Bukachacha Formation, contemporaneous fossiliferous formation of Zabaykalsky Krai
