= Bukachacha Formation =

Geological formation in Russia

- Stratigraphic range: Barremian; ~129–125 Ma
- Type: Geological formation

Lithology
- Primary: Mudstone
- Other: Tuff

Location
- Coordinates: 53.0°N 116.9°E
- Approximate paleocoordinates: 56.7°N 114.9°E
- Region: Zabaykalsky Krai
- Country: Russia

Type section
- Named for: Bukachacha
- Bukachacha Formation (Russia)

The Bukachacha Formation is a geological formation in Zabaykalsky Krai, Russia dating to the Early Cretaceous (Barremian). The tuffaceous mudstones of the formation were deposited in a lacustrine environment.

== Fossil content ==
The formation has provided fossil insects and trees:

- Coleoptera
  - Coptoclavidae
    - Stygeonectes jurassicus
- Trichoptera
  - Phryganeidae
    - Proagrypnia sp.
- Ephemerida
  - Hexagenitidae
    - Ephemeropsis trisetalis

- Baierella sp.
- Pseudotorellia sp.
- Sphenobaiera sp.
- Araucariaceae indet.
- Cheirolepidiaceae indet.
- Cyatheaceae indet.
- Gleicheniaceae indet.
- Miroviaceae indet.
- Osmundaceae indet.
- Pinaceae indet.
- Schizaeaceae indet.
- Taxodiaceae indet.

== See also ==
- List of fossiliferous stratigraphic units in Russia
- Batylykh Formation, contemporaneous fossiliferous formation of Buryatia
