= Moskvoretskaya Formation =

Geologic formation in Russia

- Stratigraphic range: Bathonian; ~168–167 Ma
- Type: Geological formation
- Sub-units: Meshchera Member
- Underlies: Callovian and Oxfordian marine claystones
- Overlies: Unconformably (about 150 Ma) overlying and infilling Middle Carboniferous limestone
- Area: Kolomensky District, Moscow Oblast
- Thickness: Variable

Lithology
- Primary: Claystone, siltstone
- Other: Sandstone

Location
- Coordinates: 55.2°N 38.8°E
- Approximate paleocoordinates: 48.8°N 41.2°E
- Region: Moscow
- Country: Russia
- Extent: Localized in karstified limestones

Type section
- Named for: Moskva River
- Moskvoretskaya Formation (Russia) Moskvoretskaya Formation (Moscow Oblast)

The Moskvoretskaya Formation is a Middle Jurassic (Bathonian stage) geologic formation in the European part of Russia. It consists of continental claystones, siltstones and sandstones deposited in karstified segments of underlying Middle Carboniferous limestone, that would have formed underground aquifers.

The formation is divided up into two members, the lower consists of dark clays to silts and is highly fossiliferous, while the upper member is sandy and lean in fossil content.

The remains of indeterminate tetanuran dinosaurs are known from the formation. As are fossil flora, fish and abundant remains of the turtle Heckerochelys romani, and various other fossils.

== Fossil content ==
=== Amphibians ===
Amphibians
Genus	Species	Location	Stratigraphic position	Material	Notes
Urodela	Gen. et sp. indet.	Peski locality.		A fragmentary trunk vertebra.	A crown salamander.

=== Reptiles ===
==== Turtles ====
Turtles
Genus	Species	Location	Stratigraphic position	Material	Notes
Heckerochelys	H. romani	Moscow	Kolomna		A stem turtle belonging to Mesochelydia.

==== Crocodyliforms ====
Neosuchians
Genus	Species	Location	Stratigraphic position	Material	Notes
Neosuchia	Gen. et sp. indet.	Moscow	Kolomna	Vertebrae, teeth, dentary fragment	

==== Lepidosauromorpha ====
Lepidosauromorpha
Genus	Species	Location	Stratigraphic position	Material	Notes
Lepidosauromorpha	Indeterminate	Peski		Left maxilla	Previously referred to the choristodere Cteniogenys. Similar to Marmoretta and Fraxinisaura.

==== Dinosaurs ====
Dinosaurs
Genus	Species	Location	Stratigraphic position	Material	Notes
Tetanurae	Gen. et sp. indet.			Includes a partial skull, tooths and postcranial elements	Formerly referred to Richardoestesia and Coelurosauria

=== Therapsids ===
Therapsids
Genus	Species	Location	Stratigraphic position	Material	Notes
Morganucodontidae?	Gen. et sp. indet.			Femur	

=== Fish ===
- Ceratodus segnis
- Ischyodus cf. egertoni
- Hybodus sp.
- Lepidotes sp.
- Ptycholepis sp.
- Dapediidae indet.

=== Flora ===
- Cedrus sp.
- Picea sp.
- Pinus sp.
- Bennettitales indet.
- Cyatheaceae indet.
- Cycadales indet.
- Gingkoales indet.
- Gleicheniaceae indet.
- Peltaspermales indet.

=== Other ===
- Scyadopitys verticillata
- cf. Gobiops sp.
- Caudata indet.

== See also ==
- List of dinosaur-bearing rock formations
  - List of stratigraphic units with indeterminate dinosaur fossils
- List of fossiliferous stratigraphic units in Russia
- Mitchell Plain, karst field in Mississippian limestone in Indiana, United States
- Bemaraha Formation, Bathonian dinosaur-bearing formation of Madagascar
- Itat Formation, Middle Jurassic fossiliferous formation of Western Siberia
