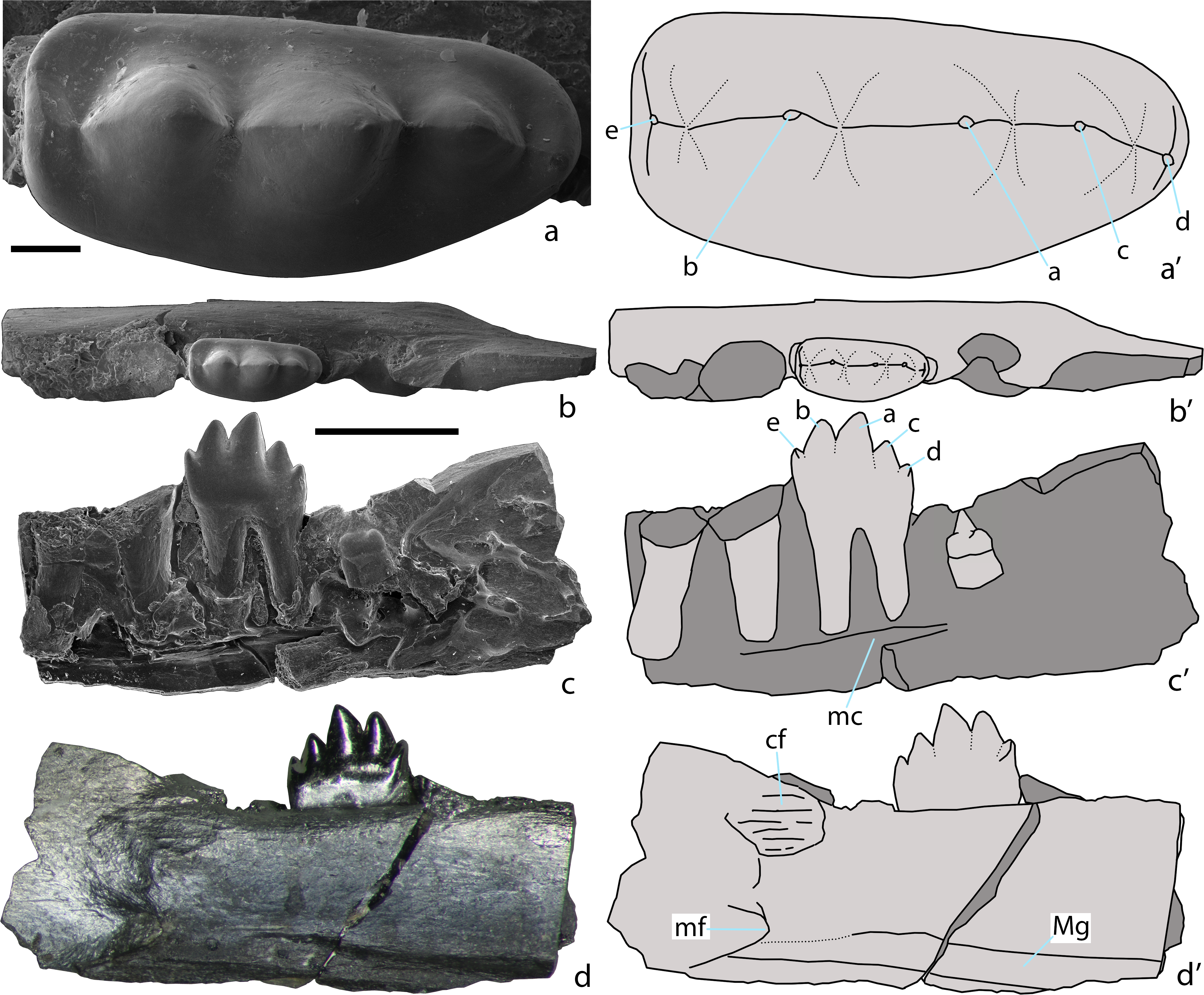
- Holotype jaw fragment with a close-up view of the tooth crown

Scientific classification
- Kingdom: Animalia
- Phylum: Chordata
- Class: Mammalia
- Order: †Eutriconodonta
- Genus: †Sangarotherium; Averianov et al., 2018

Type species
- †Sangarotherium aquilonium Averianov et al., 2018

= Sangarotherium =

Sangarotherium Temporal range: Early Cretaceous (Berriasian? – Barremian)

Extinct genus of mammals

Sangarotherium is an extinct genus of eutriconodont mammal from the Early Cretaceous of Russia. It contains a single species, Sangarotherium aquilonium, known from a lower jaw fragment with one fully erupted tooth and fragments of two other teeth. This fossil was discovered at Teete, a microvertebrate site from the Batylykh Formation of the Sangar Series, in the Siberian Republic of Yakutia.

Like most other eutriconodonts, the complete molariform tooth has five pointed cusps aligned in a straight line (from front to back, cusps e, b, a, c, and d). The largest cusps (in order) are a, b, and c, while cusps e and d are very small. These cusp proportions differ from known eutriconodont families, so Sangarotherium is classified as Eutriconodonta incertae sedis. Sangarotherium also bears an extensive Meckel's groove, and it is the only eutriconodont with a prominent rugose coronoid facet. Bajpai et al 2024 recovers it as closely related to Volaticotherini.

During the Early Cretaceous, the Teete site may have been located at up to 70° North, above the Arctic Circle. This would make Sangarotherium the most northerly known mammal of the Early Cretaceous. Despite its arctic latitude, the Teete site would have had a temperate climate according to the presence of lizards, salamanders, and turtles, though the latter are exceptionally rare. Docodontan and haramiyidan mammaliaform fossils have also been reported, as well as dinosaur teeth.
