= Karabaglyar Formation =

Permo-Triassic geologic formation in Transcaucasia

- Stratigraphic range: Changhsingian-Induan; ~252.3–251.3 Ma
- Type: Formation

Lithology
- Primary: Limestone
- Other: Claystone

Location
- Coordinates: 39.5°N 45.4°E
- Approximate paleocoordinates: 0.3°S 38.8°E
- Region: Transcaucasia
- Country: Armenia; Azerbaijan

Type section
- Named for: Karabaglyar
- Karabaglyar Formation (Caucasus Mountains)

The Karabaglyar Formation is a geologic formation in Armenia and Azerbaijan. It preserves fossils dated to the Changhsingian age of the Permian period and the Induan age of the Triassic period, straddling the Permian-Triassic boundary.

== Fossil content ==
The following fossils have been reported from the formation:

Ammonites

- Eumorphotis venetiana
- Meekophiceras dubium
- Ophiceras (Lytophiceras) medium
- Eumorphotis sp.
- Gyronites sp.
- Koninckites sp.
- Kymatites sp.
- Lytophiceras sp.
- Ophiceras sp.

Bivalves

- Claraia aurita
- Claraia clarai
- Claraia stachei
- Claraia wangi
- Claraia sp.

== See also ==
- List of fossiliferous stratigraphic units in Armenia
- List of fossiliferous stratigraphic units in Azerbaijan
- Gnishik Formation
- Permian–Triassic extinction event
