= Kulgeriherpeton =

Kulgeriherpeton Temporal range: Early Cretaceous

Scientific classification
- Kingdom: Animalia
- Phylum: Chordata
- Class: Amphibia
- Order: Urodela
- Genus: †Kulgeriherpeton
- Species: †K. ultimum

Binomial name
- †Kulgeriherpeton ultimum Skutschas et al., 2018

Extinct genus of salamanders

Kulgeriherpeton is an extinct genus of stem salamander that lived in Russia during the Early Cretaceous epoch. It contains the species K. ultimum.
