= Akhura Formation =

Geologic formation in Armenia

- Stratigraphic range: Wuchiapingian-Changhsingian
- Type: Formation

Location
- Country: Armenia; Azerbaijan

The Akhura Formation is a geologic formation in Armenia and Azerbaijan. It preserves fossils dated to the Permian period.

== See also ==
- List of fossiliferous stratigraphic units in Armenia
- List of fossiliferous stratigraphic units in Azerbaijan
