= Gundara Formation =

Geologic formation in Armenia

- Stratigraphic range: Permian
- Type: Formation

Location
- Country: Armenia

The Gundara Formation is a geologic formation in Armenia. It preserves fossils dated to the Permian period.

== See also ==
- List of fossiliferous stratigraphic units in Armenia
