= Gnishik Formation =

Permian geologic formation in Transcaucasia

- Stratigraphic range: Wordian (late Murgabian); ~268–265 Ma
- Type: Formation
- Underlies: Arpa Formation (Armenia); Khachik Formations (Iran)
- Overlies: Asni Formation (Armenia); Dorud Formation (Iran)
- Thickness: 300 m (980 ft) (Armenia); 670 m (2,200 ft) (Iran)

Lithology
- Primary: Limestone
- Other: Shale

Location
- Coordinates: 39.0°N 45.0°E
- Approximate paleocoordinates: 9.1°S 41.4°E
- Region: Transcaucasia
- Country: Armenia; Azerbaijan; Iran
- Extent: Alborz Mountains

Type section
- Named for: Gnishik River
- Named by: Arakelyan
- Year defined: 1964
- Gnishik Formation (Caucasus Mountains)

The Gnishik Formation is a geologic formation in Armenia, Azerbaijan and Iran. It preserves fossils dated to the Wordian age of the Permian period.

The thin-bedded limestones of the formation reach a thickness of 670 metres (2,200 ft) in the Julfa section of northwestern Iran and 300 metres (980 ft) in the Arpa River valley of Armenia. The sediments were deposited in an open marine setting at the northern edge of the Paleo-Tethys Ocean.

The coral Wentzellophyllum gnishikense was named after the formation.

== Description ==
The Gnishik Formation was first formally described by Arakelyan in 1964, based on a section in the Gnishik River valley, after which the formation was named. The formation is mostly represented by thin-bedded, occasionally shaly, dark grey and black bituminous foraminiferal-algal biodetrital limestones. The occasional admixture of clayey and terrigenous material colors the limestones light grey and yellowish. The thin-bedded layers alternate with coarser-bedded compact varieties.

The open marine limestones of the formation reach a thickness of 670 metres (2,200 ft) in the Julfa section of northwestern Iran. In Iran, the formation overlies the Dorud Formation and is overlain by the Khachik Formation, while in Armenia the formation rests on top of the Asni Formation and is overlain by the Arpa Formation. The Gnishik Formation represents an increase in subsidence rate in the Permian. The sediments were deposited at the northern edge of the Paleo-Tethys Ocean.

The formation is dated to the late Murgabian, which belongs to the Wordian stage of the Middle Permian. The Gnishik Formation is correlated with the Ruteh and Nesen Formations, and the Kuffengian stage of Chinese chronostratigraphy.

== Fossil content ==
Among many others, the following fossils have been reported from the formation:

=== Invertebrates ===
Trilobites

- Pseudophillipsia armenica
- Pseudophillipsia (Carniphillipsia) paffenholzi
- Acropyge sp.

Cephalopods

- Orthocerida indet.

Gastropods

- Pharkidonotus khairliensis
- Naticopsis cf. spectatus
- Bellerophon sp.
- Naticopsis sp.
- Straparollus sp.
- ?Euphemites sp.
- ?Platyceras sp.
- Bellerophontidae indet.

Corals

- Ipciphyllum araxense
- I. flexuosum
- I. originale
- I. ex gr. restriseptatum
- I. simplex
- I. subtimoricum
- I. subelegans
- Lonsdaleia aff. gracilis
- L. aff. jenningsi
- Lophocarinophyllum lophophyllidum
- L. pulchrum
- L. aff. zaphrentoideum
- Michelinia vesiculosa
- Paraipciphyllum transcaucasicum
- Parawentzelella (Parawentzelella) canalifera
- Pentaphyllum leptoconicum
- Praetachylasma alternatum
- Protomichelinia microstoma
- Sinopora asiatica
- Szechuanophyllum szechuanense
- Ufimia elongata
- Wentzelella armenica
- Wentzelella (Wentzelella) densicolumnata
- Wentzellophyllum gnishikense
- W. parvus
- W. volzi
- Yatsengia asiatica
- Lophophyllidium sp.
- Wentzelella sp.

Crinoids

- ?Poteriocrinites ardjichensis

Rhynchonellata

- Cryptospirifer omeishanensis
- Septospirigerella baissalensis
- Terebratuloidea davidsoni
- Crenispirifer sp.
- Septospirigerella sp.

Strophomenata

- Chonostegoides baissalensis
- C. ogbinensis
- Edriosteges poyangensis
- Leptodus sp.

Stenolaemata

- Mackinneyella dzhulfensis
- Rhabdomeson floriferum
- Septopora lineata

Fusulinina

- Sichotenella cf. sutschanica
- Yangchienia cf. haydeni
- Nankinella cf. ovata
- N. orbicularia
- Staffella sphaerica
- S. suborientalis
- Eoverbeekina cf. intermedia
- Pisolina abichi
- P. subsphaerica
- Leella ex gr. bellula
- Sphaerulina crassispira
- S. ogbinensis
- Verbeekina cf. heimi
- V. verbeeki
- Eopolydiexodina darwasica
- E. persica
- Polydiexodina chekiangensis
- Chusenella abichi
- C. doraschamensis
- Dunbarula sp.

Foraminifera

- Globigaetania angulata

=== Flora ===
Dasycladophyceae

- Atractyliopsis fecundus
- Diplopora americana
- Endoina stellata
- Epimastopora nipponica
- Gyroporella tenuimarginata
- Johnsonia spinosa
- Macroporella spinosa
- Mizzia velebitana
- Pseudogyroporella grandis
- Pseudovermiporella serbica
- Stolleyella yabei

Rhodophyceae

- Succodium ambiguum
- S. difficile
- Gymnocodium bellerophonte
- G. novum
- Permocalculus forospinus
- P. fragilis
- P. piai
- Ungdarella stellata

== See also ==
- List of fossiliferous stratigraphic units in Armenia
- List of fossiliferous stratigraphic units in Azerbaijan
- Geology of Armenia
- Geology of Azerbaijan
- Geology of Iran
