= Dzhulfa Formation =

Permian geologic formation in Transcaucasia

- Stratigraphic range: Wuchiapingian
- Type: Formation

Location
- Country: Armenia; Azerbaijan

The Dzhulfa Formation is a geologic formation in Armenia and Azerbaijan. It preserves fossils dated to the Wuchiapingian age of the Permian period.

== See also ==
- List of fossiliferous stratigraphic units in Armenia
- List of fossiliferous stratigraphic units in Azerbaijan
