= Geology of Europe =

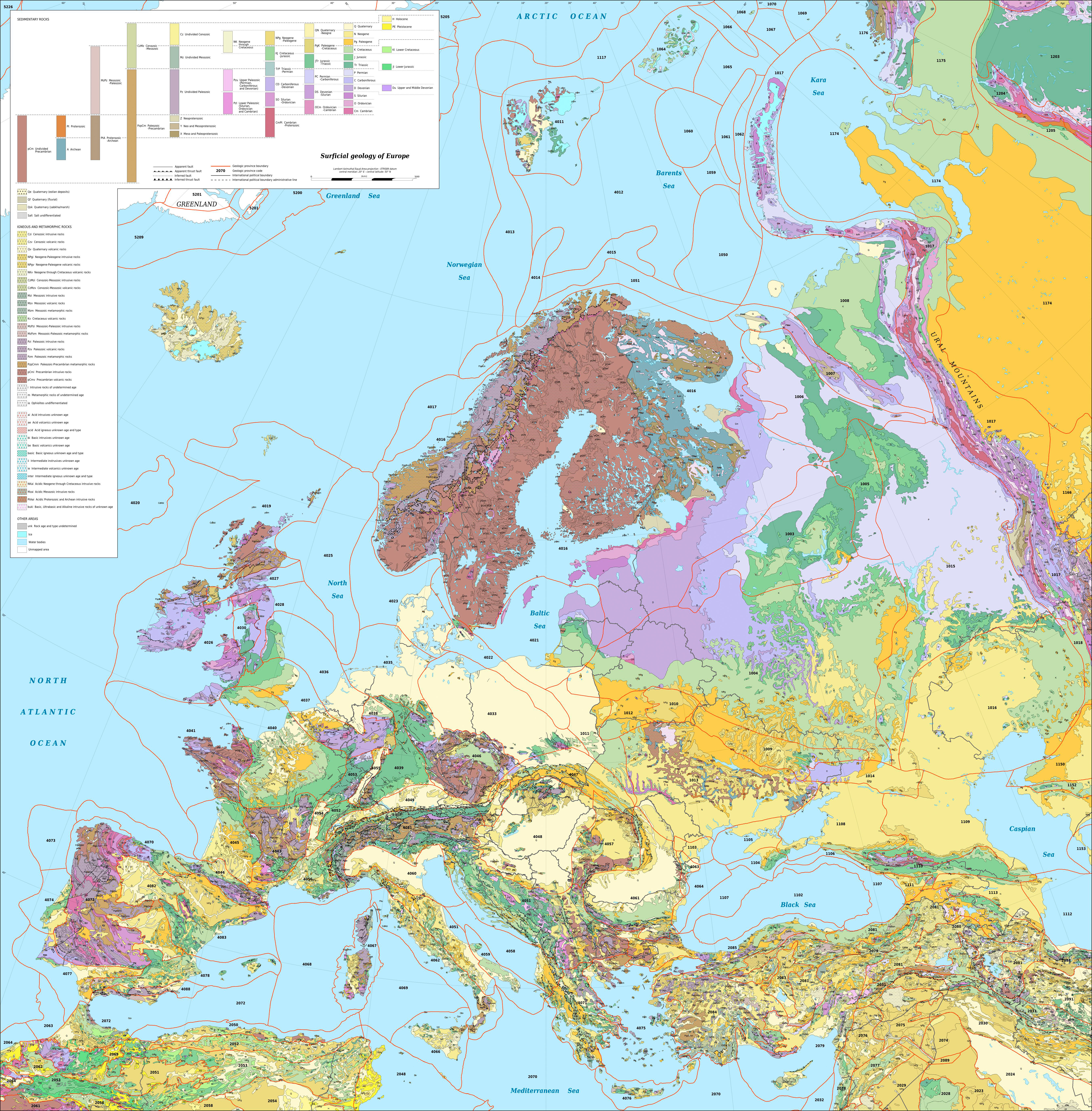
Surficial geology of Europe

The geology of Europe is varied and complex, and gives rise to the wide variety of landscapes found across the continent, from the Scottish Highlands to the rolling plains of Hungary. Europe's most significant feature is the dichotomy between highland and mountainous Southern Europe and a vast, partially underwater, northern plain ranging from England in the west to the Ural Mountains in the east. These two halves are separated by the Pyrenees and the Alps-Carpathians mountain chain. The northern plains are delimited in the west by the Scandinavian Mountains and the mountainous parts of the British Isles. The southern mountainous region is bounded by the Mediterranean Sea and the Black Sea. Major shallow water bodies submerging parts of the northern plains are the Celtic Sea, the North Sea, the Baltic Sea and the Barents Sea.

Weathering mantles made up of saprolite are common in Europe. Saprolite composition varies from kaolinitic and ferrallitic to grus. The first were formed in the Mesozoic and early Cenozoic while the latter in the late Cenozoic. Stripping of weathered rock has produced depressions occupied by numerous lakes in Finland and Sweden.

== Tectonics ==
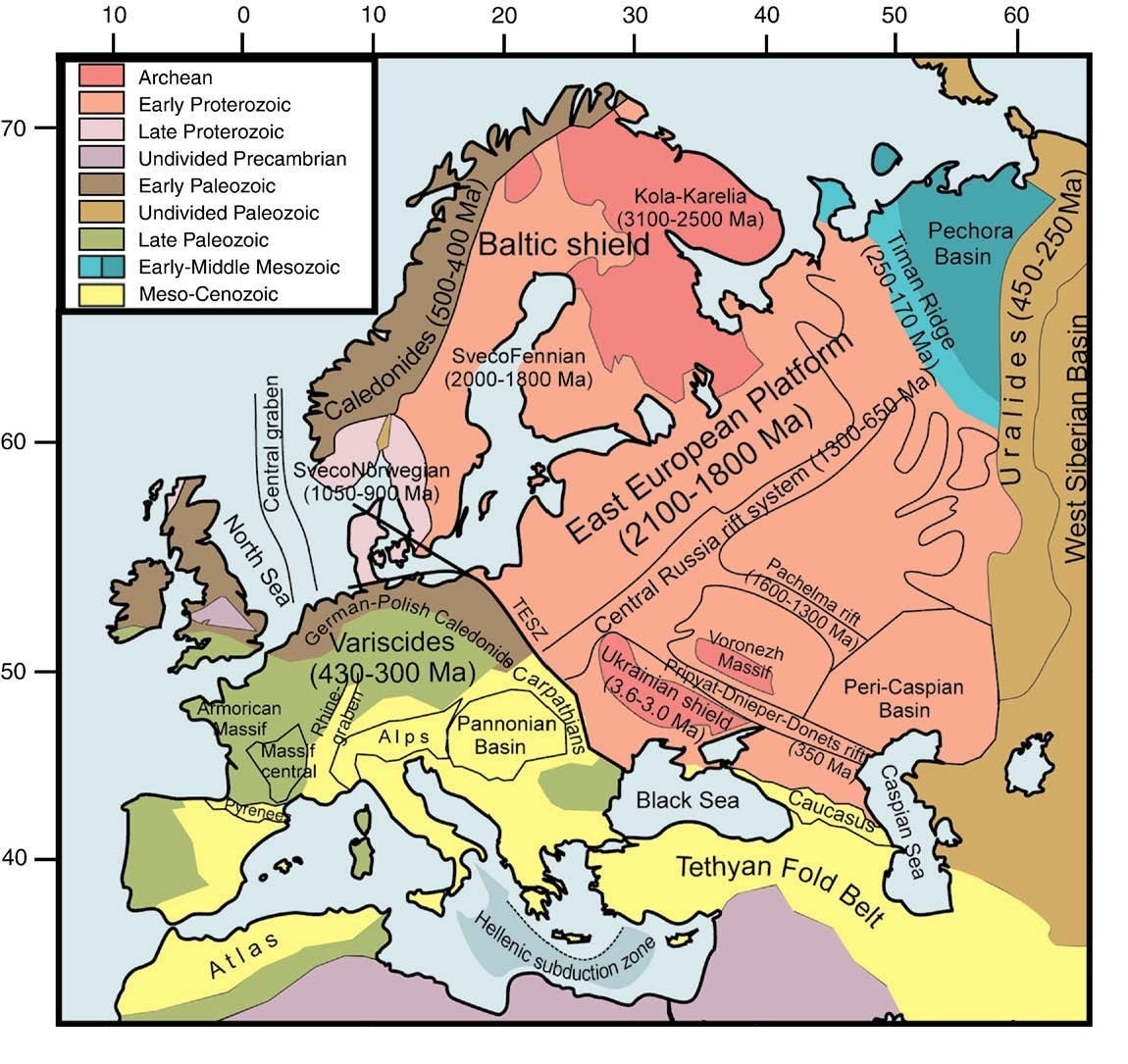
Simplified tectonic map of Europe, showing the Baltic Shield and East European Platform ( ) separated from the European orogenic belts (Caledonian ;Variscan ; Alpine ) by the Trans-European Suture Zone (TESZ).

From the standpoint of plate tectonics, the ongoing northward drive of the African Plate into the Eurasian Plate in the Mediterranean basin is the most prominent aspect of the European scene today. The pressure exerted by the African plate is the overall cause of the rise of the Pyrenees, the Alps and the Carpathian Mountains. Limestones and other sediments, the ancient floor of the Tethys Sea, are pushed high and now make up much of these ranges. A submarine back-arc basin develops south of Italy, which is one of several Mediterranean mini-continental fragments caught between the two plates. This buckling of the Earth's crust forces up Italy's mountains and stimulates active faults and volcanoes such as Mount Etna. Iberia, another separate terrain unit, has been rotated and emplaced against the rest of Europe by the plate collision.

Moving north from the Alps and other ranges, tectonic activity largely fades away in the stable Baltic craton. One exception to this trend is a hot spot, rising from the mantle underneath central Germany, which has been responsible in geologic time for volcanoes such as the Vogelsberg in Hesse and currently provides heat to hot springs and lakes in the region.

=== Provinces ===
Geologically, Europe is composed of a Precambrian core – the East European Craton, which was accreted during the Phanerozoic Eon by three major crustal blocks: the Caledonides in the west and northwest, the Variscides in the southwest, and the Alpine orogenic systems in the south. On the eastern margin, the Timan orogenic belt was added by the end of the Precambrian, while the Ural orogen developed during the late Paleozoic to early Mesozoic.

The East European Craton constitutes by far the largest crustal block, making up nearly half of the continent. The Caledonian, Variscan, and Alpine blocks each account for about one-fifth to one-quarter of the continent’s area, with a significant portion now submerged beneath the sea.

=== Components ===
Europe consists of the following cratons and terranes and microcontinents:

- the Baltica craton - Scandinavia, Finland, the Baltic states, Russia, northern Poland and northern Germany,
- Avalonian fragments - England, Ireland, Netherlands, northern Germany, etc.,
- Laurentian (North American) fragments - Western Norway and Scotland,
- Gondwana fragments - Spain, Italy, Malta, possibly belonging to the Cimmerian Arc,
- Neo-Tethys Ocean floor - the Pyrenees/Alps/Apennine/Balkan Alps/Carpathian complex,
- the Anatolian part of the Cimmerian Arc originating from Gondwana.

== Geological history ==
The geologic history of Europe spans billions of years and reflects a complex interplay of tectonic processes. Archean rocks, over 2.5 billion years old, represent the oldest formations of the Precambrian era and are exposed in the northern Baltic Shield, Ukraine, and northwestern Scotland. The Baltic Shield also contains two significant Proterozoic orogenic belts, which formed between 2.5 billion and 541 million years ago and extend across its central and southern regions. These features indicate that the Baltic Shield is of composite origin, consisting of remnants of several Precambrian orogenic belts.

About 540 to 500 million years ago, a series of new oceans opened, and their eventual closure gave rise to the Caledonian, Hercynian, and Uralian orogenic belts over hundreds of millions of years through plate-tectonic activity. The formation of these belts contributed to the assembly of the supercontinent Pangea. Around 200 million years ago, Pangea began to fragment, leading to the formation of the Tethys Sea. About 50 million years ago, the closure of this ocean, driven by subduction and tectonic processes, resulted in the Alpine orogeny. This event created the Alpine orogenic system, a network of mountain chains stretching from the Atlantic Ocean to Turkey. The system includes notable ranges such as the Pyrenees, Baetic Cordillera, Atlas Mountains, Swiss-Austrian Alps, Apennines, Carpathians, Dinaric Alps, and the Taurus and Pontic mountains. During the early stages of the Tethys Sea's development, around 180 million years ago, the Atlantic Ocean also began to open.

Today, the Atlantic Ocean continues to expand along the Mid-Atlantic Ridge, a tectonic boundary beneath the ocean. Iceland represents a segment of this ridge that rises above sea level. Modern tectonic activity in Europe is evident in several dynamic geological phenomena, including ongoing volcanic eruptions in Iceland and at volcanoes such as Mount Etna and Mount Vesuvius. Additionally, seismic activity in the Aegean region and the Alpine system reflects present-day stresses resulting from interactions between the Eurasian and African tectonic plates.

== See also ==
- Geography of Europe
- European Cenozoic Rift System
