= Khachik Formation =

Permian geologic formation in Transcaucasia

- Stratigraphic range: Capitanian-Wuchiapingian
- Type: Formation
- Overlies: Gnishik Formation

Location
- Region: Transcaucasia
- Country: Armenia, Azerbaijan, Iran

The Khachik Formation is a geologic formation in Armenia, Azerbaijan and Iran.

It preserves fossils dated to the Capitanian to Wuchiapingian ages of the Permian period.

== See also ==
- List of fossiliferous stratigraphic units in Armenia
- List of fossiliferous stratigraphic units in Azerbaijan
