= List of fossiliferous stratigraphic units in Russia =

| Group or Formation | Period | Notes |
|---|---|---|
| Abasheva Formation | Jurassic | |
| Abashevo Suite Formation | Jurassic | |
| Abrekskaya Suite Formation | Permian | |
| Acheshbok Formation | Triassic | |
| Admiralty Formation | Triassic | |
| Adz'va Formation | Permian | |
| Agabyt Formation | Triassic | |
| Agitkan Formation | Triassic | |
| Agulak Suite Formation | Jurassic | |
| Akachan Formation | Permian, Carboniferous | |
| Akatievo Formation | Carboniferous | |
| Akatuevskaya Formation | Jurassic | |
| Akavassky Formation | Carboniferous | |
| Akchalym Formation | Silurian | |
| Akdurug Formation | Cambrian | |
| Aksai Suite Formation | Jurassic | |
| Aksaisk Formation | Jurassic | |
| Aktash Formation | Silurian | |
| Aktash Suite Formation | Jurassic | |
| Aktasty Formation | Permian | |
| Aleksandrovskii Formation | Carboniferous | |
| Aleksin Formation | Carboniferous | |
| Altatka Suite Formation | Jurassic | |
| Aluginskaya Formation | Paleogene | |
| Alykaevskaya Formation | Carboniferous | |
| Alyutovo Formation | Carboniferous | |
| Amanak Formation | Permian | |
| Amanakskaya Formation | Permian | |
| Amaninskaya Formation | Paleogene | |
| Amata Formation | Devonian | |
| Amba Formation | Triassic | |
| Amkanzhin Formation | Permian | |
| Amkin Formation | Cretaceous | |
| Angachi Formation | Silurian | |
| Antibes Formation | Cretaceous | |
| Antiinsky Formation | Permian | |
| Antiya Formation | Permian | |
| Apsat Formation | Cretaceous | |
| Arakay Group/Arakayskaya Formation | Paleogene | |
| Arakay Group/Gastellovskaya Formation | Paleogene | |
| Arakay Group/Gennoyshinskaya Formation | Paleogene | |
| Argun Formation | Cretaceous | |
| Arkachan Formation | Permian | |
| Arkagalinskaya Formation | Cretaceous | |
| Asatausky Formation | Carboniferous | |
| Askyn Formation | Devonian | |
| Askynbashsky Formation | Carboniferous | |
| Astronomicheskogo Mysa Formation | Paleogene | |
| Atkan Formation | Permian | |
| Ausinskaya Formation | Neogene | |
| Avamskaya Suite Formation | Permian | |
| Avlandian Formation | Permian | |
| Ayach'yaga Formation | Permian | |
| Ayak Suite Formation | Jurassic | |
| Aykhal Formation | Carboniferous | |
| Ayyuvinskiy Formation | Carboniferous | |
| Babuk Formation | Triassic | |
| Badin Formation | Jurassic | |
| Bagan Formation | Ordovician | |
| Baigendzhi Formation | Permian | |
| Baigendzhin Formation | Permian | |
| Baikur Formation | Permian | |
| Baital Formation | Silurian | |
| Baitugan Formation | Permian | |
| Bajtugan Formation | Permian | |
| Bakalinskian Suite Formation | Permian | |
| Baksanii Formation | Ordovician | |
| Balakhtison Formation | Cambrian | |
| Baley Formation | Cretaceous | |
| Barabash Formation | Permian | |
| Barabashskaya Formation | Permian | |
| Baraniy Formation | Ordovician | |
| Barents Formation | Carboniferous | |
| Basal and coal Formation | Jurassic | |
| Batylykh Formation | Cretaceous | |
| Bayan Kol Formation | Cambrian | |
| Baytugan Formation | Permian | |
| Bazaikha Formation | Cambrian | |
| Bazanov and Bokhtin Suite Formation | Jurassic | |
| Bazanovo and Bokhto Suites Formation | Jurassic | |
| Bazarli Suite Formation | Jurassic | |
| Bazhenov Formation | Cretaceous | |
| Begichev Formation | Cretaceous | |
| Beglyi Formation | Permian | |
| Begunovskaya Formation | Neogene | |
| Belalabinskaya Group/Nikitin Formation | Permian | |
| Belalabinskaya Group/Urushten Formation | Permian | |
| Belaya Kalitva Formation | Carboniferous | |
| Belebeevo Formation | Permian | |
| Belebei Formation | Permian | |
| Belebeyeoskaya Suite Formation | Permian | |
| Belkovskaya Formation | Permian | |
| Belogorsk Formation | Silurian | |
| Beloshchel'e Formation | Permian | |
| Belovo Horizon Formation | Devonian | |
| Belushkin Formation | Permian | |
| Belushkinskaya Suite Formation | Permian | |
| Belyi Yar Formation | Carboniferous | |
| Berchogur? Formation | Devonian | |
| Bereza Beds Formation | Cretaceous | |
| Berge Suite Formation | Jurassic | |
| Berikul Formation | Cambrian | |
| Bezymyanny Formation | Permian | |
| Biertdag Formation | Devonian | |
| Bilir Formation | Cambrian | |
| Bitak Suite Formation | Jurassic | |
| Bizovskaya Suite Formation | Permian | |
| Blinovo Formation | Neogene | |
| Bochara Formation | Permian | |
| Boets Formation | Permian | |
| Boguchan Formation | Permian | |
| Boguchany Formation | Permian | |
| Bokhtin Formation | Jurassic | |
| Bokhto Suite Formation | Jurassic | |
| Bol'shaya Kheta Group/Nadoyakh Formation | Jurassic | |
| Bol'sheishin Formation | Cambrian | |
| Bolshekinelskaya Formation | Permian | |
| Bolshesininskaya Series Group/Mishayagskaya Suite Formation | Triassic | |
| Bolshesininskaya Series Group/Vyatkinskaya Suite Formation | Triassic | |
| Borodino Suite Formation | Jurassic | |
| Botchi Formation | Neogene | |
| Britvinskaya Series Formation | Permian | |
| Bugali Formation | Permian | |
| Bugarikta Formation | Triassic | |
| Bugryshikhinskaya Formation | Ordovician | |
| Bukachacha Formation | Cretaceous | |
| Bukobai Formation | Triassic | |
| Bukobaiskaya Suite Formation | Triassic | |
| Bukobay Formation | Triassic | |
| Bukukun Formation | Jurassic | |
| Bukukun Suite Formation | Jurassic | |
| Bulunkan Formation | Triassic | |
| Buregi Formation | Devonian | |
| Burgali Formation | Permian | |
| Burguklinskaya Formation | Permian | |
| Burguklinskaya Suite Formation | Permian | |
| Burkguklinian suite Formation | Permian | |
| Burskii Formation | Ordovician | |
| Burtsevsky Formation | Permian | |
| Byankino Formation | Jurassic | |
| Byankinskaya Formation | Jurassic | |
| Bykov Formation | Cretaceous | |
| Byrranga Formation | Permian | |
| Bystraya Formation | Cambrian | |
| Bytantay Formation | Permian | |
| Byzovaya Formation | Triassic | |
| Cabanin Horizon Formation | Devonian | |
| Cape Zhurinskiy outcrop Formation | Cambrian | |
| Carbonate Formation | Triassic | |
| Carbonate, Clastic carbonate Formation | Triassic | |
| Chagachan Suite Formation | Jurassic | |
| Chakyr Formation | Ordovician | |
| Chalmak Formation | Silurian | |
| Chambin Formation | Permian | |
| Chandalaz Formation | Permian | |
| Charkabozh Formation | Triassic | |
| Chebalsinskaya Formation | Permian | |
| Chechuma Suite Formation | Jurassic | |
| Chegitun Formation | Ordovician | |
| Chekhan Formation | Cambrian | |
| Chelyabinskaya Series Group/Kalachevskaya Suite Formation | Triassic | |
| Chelyabinskaya Series Group/Korkinskaya Suite Formation | Triassic | |
| Chelyabinskaya Series Group/Kozirevskaya Suite Formation | Triassic | |
| Chepa Suite Formation | Jurassic | |
| Cheremkhovo Formation | Jurassic | |
| Cheremkhovo Suite Formation | Jurassic | |
| Cheremkhovskaya Formation | Jurassic | |
| Cheriyusskaya Suite Formation | Permian | |
| Chernaya Bay Horizon Formation | Devonian | |
| Chernorechian Suite Formation | Permian | |
| Chernovskaya Group/Doronino Formation | Cretaceous | |
| Cherpel' Suite Formation | Jurassic | |
| Chertovskia Formation | Ordovician | |
| Chichikan Formation | Triassic | |
| Chigan Formation | Cretaceous | |
| Chikoi Formation | Neogene | |
| Chinka Formation | Permian | |
| Chisyan Formation | Permian | |
| Chochaskaya Suite Formation | Permian | |
| Chopko Formation | Cambrian | |
| Chusovitino Suite Formation | Jurassic | |
| Cladochonus Limestone Formation | Permian | |
| Clastic carbonate Formation | Triassic | |
| Coal Suite Formation | Jurassic | |
| Conglomerate Suite Formation | Jurassic | |
| Coryphyllia Beds Formation | Triassic | |
| Dadoy Formation | Permian | |
| Daekhuriin Group/Daekhuriinskaya Formation | Paleogene | |
| Daekhuriin Group/Mutnovskaya Formation | Paleogene | |
| Dagi Group/Agnevskaya Formation | Neogene | |
| Dagi Group/Daginskaya Formation | Neogene | |
| Dainskaya Formation | Cretaceous | |
| Dal'nii Suite Formation | Jurassic | |
| Daratuiskiy Formation | Permian | |
| Dashtygoi Formation | Silurian | |
| Dashtygoi Beds Formation | Silurian | |
| Daya Formation | Cretaceous | |
| Degali Formation | Permian | |
| Degibadam Suite Formation | Jurassic | |
| Delendzha Formation | Permian | |
| Delendzhin Formation | Permian | |
| Delenzhinskaya Suite Formation | Permian | |
| Dem'yanovskaya Formation | Triassic | |
| Dep Suite Formation | Jurassic | |
| Dietken Formation | Ordovician | |
| Div'ya Formation | Permian | |
| Djaskoian Formation | Jurassic | |
| Dmitriyevskaya Formation | Cambrian | |
| Dolborskii Formation | Ordovician | |
| Dolgan Formation | Cretaceous | |
| Domanik Formation | Devonian | |
| Donguz Formation | Triassic | |
| Dulankhora Suite Formation | Jurassic | |
| Dulgalakh Formation | Permian | |
| Dulgalakhskaya Suite Formation | Permian | |
| Duraisk Formation | Jurassic | |
| Durnayu Formation | Silurian | |
| Dvuroginskaya Suite Formation | Triassic, Permian | |
| Dyby Formation | Permian | |
| Dzharsu Suite Formation | Jurassic | |
| Dzhaskoi Suite Formation | Jurassic | |
| Dzhelon Suite Formation | Jurassic | |
| Dzheltin Formation | Permian | |
| Dzheltinskaya Formation | Permian | |
| Dzhiakunian Formation | Permian | |
| Dzhigdali Formation | Permian | |
| Dzhil' Suite Formation | Jurassic | |
| Dzhuptagin Formation | Permian | |
| Echii Formation | Permian | |
| Echinosphaerites Chalk Formation | Ordovician | |
| Echiy Formation | Permian | |
| Edzhid Formation | Carboniferous | |
| Efremov Formation | Permian | |
| Eksenya Formation | Cretaceous | |
| Ekushanskaya Suite Formation | Permian | |
| El'gyan Formation | Cambrian | |
| Elegest Suite Formation | Jurassic | |
| Elets Formation | Devonian | |
| Emanra Formation | Cretaceous | |
| Emjaksin Formation | Cambrian | |
| Emyaksin Formation | Cambrian | |
| Endybal Formation | Permian | |
| Endybal Formation | Permian | |
| Enemtenskaya Formation | Neogene | |
| Er Formation | Permian | |
| Erbek Suite Formation | Jurassic | |
| Erkeket Formation | Cambrian | |
| Ermanovka Group/Etolon Formation | Neogene | |
| Ermanovskaya Formation | Neogene | |
| Erunakov Formation | Permian | |
| Erunakovskaya Group/Gramoteinskaya Formation | Permian | |
| Erunakovskaya Group/Leninskaya Formation | Permian | |
| Etolon Formation | Neogene | |
| Etolonskaya Formation | Neogene | |
| Evenkskaya Formation | Permian | |
| Evlanovo Formation | Devonian | |
| Evtropina Formation | Devonian | |
| Ezhovyi Formation | Neogene | |
| Fedorovskiy Formation | Permian | |
| Filipp'el Formation | Silurian | |
| Fol'k Formation | Permian | |
| Gabdrashidov Formation | Permian | |
| Gabdrashitovian Suite Formation | Permian | |
| Gabdrashitovian Suite? Formation | Permian | |
| Gabirut and Dzhizhikrut Suites Formation | Jurassic | |
| Gakkhinskaya Formation | Paleogene | |
| Galindai Formation | Permian | |
| Gamskaya Group/Yarenskian Formation | Triassic | - |
| Ganin Formation | Devonian | |
| Gankin Formation | Cretaceous | |
| Gapshima Formation | Cretaceous | |
| Gazov Formation | Permian | |
| Gerkinskaya Formation | Permian | |
| Getkilninskaya Formation | Paleogene | |
| Gidarin Formation | Jurassic | |
| Gidarinskaya Formation | Cretaceous | |
| Gizhiga Formation | Permian | |
| Glubokaya Formation | Devonian | |
| Glushinskaya Formation | Jurassic | |
| Glushkovo Formation | Jurassic | |
| Godymboy Formation | Cretaceous | |
| Godymboyskaya Formation | Cretaceous | |
| Golomyannyj Formation | Silurian | |
| Gorbiyachin Formation | Cambrian | |
| Gorbousha Formation | Cretaceous, Jurassic | |
| Goryachikh Klyuchey Formation | Neogene | |
| Granatovoya Formation | Neogene | |
| Greben Formation | Silurian | |
| Gremyashchij Formation | Devonian | |
| Gundara Formation | Cretaceous | |
| Gurimisskaya Suite Formation | Triassic | |
| Gurud Suite Formation | Jurassic | |
| Gusinaya Formation | Permian | |
| Gusinozemelskaya Formation | Permian | |
| Herbesskaya Formation | Carboniferous | |
| Holmsk Formation | Neogene | |
| Holodnolog Formation | Permian | |
| Honto Formation | Neogene | |
| Honto Group/Aushi Formation | Neogene | |
| Honto Group/Hacchorei Formation | Neogene | |
| Ichetuy Formation | Jurassic | |
| Ichetuy Suite Formation | Jurassic | |
| Il'chir Formation | Cambrian | |
| Il'inskaya Formation | Neogene | |
| Il'inskaya Formation | Permian | |
| Il'inskaya Formation | Permian | |
| Il'inskaya Group/Uskatskaya Formation | Permian | |
| Il'khatunskaya Formation | Paleogene | |
| Ilanskaya Suite Formation | Jurassic | |
| Ilek Formation | Cretaceous | |
| Ilibei Formation | Permian | |
| Ilibeiskaya Formation | Permian | |
| Imtachan Formation | Permian | |
| Inta Formation | Permian | |
| Intian Suite Formation | Permian | |
| Ionayskaya Formation | Paleogene | |
| Irbitey Formation | Cambrian | |
| Irbychan Formation | Permian | |
| Iren Formation | Permian | |
| Irga Formation | Permian | |
| Ishanovskaya Formation | Permian | |
| Ishanovskaya Suite Formation | Permian | |
| Itat Formation | Jurassic | |
| Itat Suite Formation | Jurassic | |
| Iva Formation | Permian | |
| Kabanka Formation | Silurian | |
| Kadyr Formation | Jurassic | |
| Kakanaut Formation | Cretaceous | |
| Kakertskaya Formation | Neogene | |
| Kalenda Suite Formation | Jurassic | |
| Kalga Suite Formation | Jurassic | |
| Kalgan Formation | Jurassic | |
| Kalinovka Formation | Permian | |
| Kalitvenskaya Formation | Permian | |
| Kalvitza Formation | Silurian | |
| Kalyan Formation | Jurassic | |
| Kamala Suite Formation | Jurassic | |
| Kamchikskaya Formation | Paleogene | |
| Kamenka Bay Horizon Formation | Devonian | |
| Kamennyi Yar Formation | Triassic | |
| Kameshkovskiy Formation | Cambrian | |
| Kamyshin Formation | Paleogene | |
| Kamyshla Formation | Permian | |
| Kamyshlinskie Formation | Permian | |
| Kanarai Formation | Jurassic | |
| Kangauz Formation | Cretaceous | |
| Kanyon Formation | Ordovician | |
| Karadan Formation | Triassic | |
| Karadiirmen' Suite Formation | Jurassic | |
| Karagan Formation | Neogene | |
| Karakhem Formation | Silurian | |
| Karalda Suite Formation | Jurassic | |
| Karasinskaya Formation | Ordovician | |
| Karazin Formation | Triassic | |
| Kardasyn Suite Formation | Jurassic | |
| Karmakula Formation | Permian | |
| Karmyssian Suite Formation | Permian | |
| Karpinsk Formation | Devonian | |
| Kata Formation | Carboniferous | |
| Katanga Formation | Cambrian | |
| Kazan Formation | Permian | |
| Kazankovo Formation | Permian | |
| Kazankovo Formation | Permian | |
| Kazarka Formation | Carboniferous | |
| Kech'pel Formation | Permian | |
| Kedrovsk Formation | Russian Federation | |
| Kemerovskaya Formation | Permian | |
| Kemerovskaya Suite Formation | Permian | |
| Kemskaya Formation | Cretaceous | |
| Keryamaelskaya Suite Formation | Triassic | |
| Kessyusa Formation | Cambrian | |
| Keteme Formation | Cambrian | |
| Khabakh Formation | Permian | |
| Khabakhskaya Suite Formation | Permian | |
| Khakanchanskaya Suite Formation | Permian | |
| Khalagai Formation | Neogene | |
| Khalalin Formation | Permian | |
| Khaldzhin Formation | Permian | |
| Khaldzin Formation | Permian | |
| Khalkitoi Suite Formation | Jurassic | |
| Khalpirki Formation | Permian | |
| Khamaka Formation | Ediacaran | |
| Khamovnicheskiy Formation | Carboniferous | |
| Khamsarin Formation | Cambrian | |
| Khanalichan Formation | Permian | |
| Khandyg Formation | Silurian | |
| Khantayka Formation | Cambrian | |
| Khapry Formation | Neogene | |
| Kharaulakh Formation | Permian | |
| Kharbalakhskaya Suite Formation | Permian | |
| Khariyasskaya Suite Formation | Permian | |
| Kharkov Formation | Paleogene | |
| Kheta Formation | Cretaceous | |
| Khilok Formation | Cretaceous | |
| Khivach Formation | Permian | |
| Khodzin Formation | Triassic | |
| Kholmsk Group/Gastellovskaya Formation | Paleogene | |
| Kholmsk Group/Kholmskaya Formation | Paleogene | |
| Kholodzhikan Suite Formation | Jurassic | |
| Khomustakhskaya Suite Formation | Permian | |
| Khorasoim Formation | Cretaceous | |
| Khorbusuonka Group/Khatyspyt Formation | Ediacaran | |
| Khorbusuonka Group/Mastakh Formation | Ediacaran | |
| Khorbusuonka Group/Turkut Formation | Ediacaran | |
| Khoreiver Formation | Ordovician | |
| Khorokitskaya Suite Formation | Carboniferous | |
| Khorokyt Formation | Permian | |
| Khulgunskaya Formation | Paleogene | |
| Khumara Suite Formation | Jurassic | |
| Khungtukun Formation | Permian | |
| Khuren Formation | Permian | |
| Khutsin Formation | Paleogene | |
| Khyuktinsky Group/First Formation | Silurian | |
| Kibitigasskaya Suite Formation | Triassic | |
| Kichkil and Tumanjak Suites Formation | Jurassic | |
| Kidrensk Formation | Ordovician | |
| Kielno Variegated Limestone Formation | Ordovician | |
| Kigiltas Formation | Permian | |
| Kigiltasskaya Suite Formation | Carboniferous | |
| Kilakirnunskaya Formation | Paleogene | |
| Kimaiskii Formation | Ordovician | |
| Kirenskii Formation | Ordovician | |
| Kirpichnikov suite Formation | Cambrian | |
| Kirpichnikov suite Group/Kirpichnikov Formation | Cambrian | |
| Kirsanovskaya Formation | Cretaceous | |
| Kizelov Formation | Carboniferous | |
| Kizi Formation | Neogene | |
| Klenova Formation | Silurian | |
| Kobyuma Formation | Permian | |
| Kocherginskaya Formation | Permian | |
| Koge Formation | Jurassic | |
| Kokala Suite Formation | Jurassic | |
| Kokkija Suite Formation | Jurassic | |
| Koktui Suite Formation | Jurassic | |
| Kokuybel'su Suite Formation | Jurassic | |
| Koldarian Suite Formation | Permian | |
| Kolonga Suite Formation | Silurian | |
| Komichan Formation | Permian | |
| Kondurovkskiy Formation | Permian | |
| Konstantin Formation | Carboniferous | |
| Konvunchana Group/Bugarikta Formation | Permian | |
| Kopanaskya Formation | Triassic | |
| Korkino Formation | Triassic | |
| Korothinskaya Formation | Ordovician | |
| Kos'yu Formation | Permian | |
| Koshelevka Formation | Permian | |
| Koshelevskaya Formation | Permian | |
| Koshelevskaya Suite Formation | Permian | |
| Kotchakan Formation | Ordovician | |
| Kotelnich Group/Urpalov Formation | Permian | |
| Kotodzha Formation | Ediacaran | |
| Kotuiskaya Suite Formation | Permian | |
| Kotuy Formation | Cambrian | |
| Kovachinskaya Formation | Paleogene | |
| Kozhim Formation | Permian | |
| Kozhim Formation | Permian | |
| Kozhimrudnik Formation | Permian | |
| Kozhimrudnitskaya Formation | Permian | |
| Kozhimrudnitzkaya Suite Formation | Permian | |
| Kozhym Formation | Permian, Ordovician | |
| Kozlovskaya Formation | Paleogene | |
| Krasnaya Bukhta Formation | Silurian | |
| Krasnoporog Formation | Cambrian | |
| Krasnoshchel' Formation | Permian | |
| Kremenskoy Formation | Carboniferous | |
| Krivaya Luka Group/Kirenskii Formation | Ordovician | |
| Krivoi Ruchei Formation | Devonian | |
| Krivorechenskaya Formation | Cretaceous | |
| Kuba Formation | Silurian | |
| Kuba Beds Formation | Silurian | |
| Kubalangdinskaya Suite Formation | Permian | |
| Kugutyk Formation | Carboniferous | |
| Kuitun Suite Formation | Jurassic | |
| Kukhiraat Suite Formation | Jurassic | |
| Kukubel'su Suite Formation | Jurassic | |
| Kul'diminskaya Formation | Triassic | |
| Kulamat Formation | Devonian | |
| Kuldiminskaya Series Formation | Triassic | |
| Kuldiminskaya Suite Formation | Triassic | |
| Kulinskaya Formation | Permian | |
| Kulogory Formation | Permian | |
| Kulomzin Formation | Cretaceous | |
| Kulsary Suite Formation | Jurassic | |
| Kultash Formation | Silurian | |
| Kulu Formation | Permian | |
| Kuluvenskaya Formation | Neogene | |
| Kulyumbe Formation | Cambrian | |
| Kumanskaya Suite Formation | Triassic | |
| Kuonamka Formation | Cambrian | |
| Kuragan Suite Formation | Ordovician | |
| Kuranakh Formation | Silurian | |
| Kurashi Formation | Neogene | |
| Kurasiyskaya Formation | Neogene | |
| Kurchavinskaya Formation | Cambrian | |
| Kurenskii Formation | Ordovician | |
| Kuroshasaisbaya Suite Formation | Triassic | |
| Kutinskaya Formation | Cretaceous | |
| Kutorgina Formation | Cambrian | |
| Kutulukskaya Formation | Permian | |
| Kuznetsk Formation | Permian | |
| Kuznetskaya Suite Formation | Permian | |
| Kuzyama Formation | Carboniferous | |
| Kwakami Formation | Cretaceous | - |
| Kybytygas Formation | Triassic | |
| Kylanskaya Formation | Paleogene | |
| Kyndal Formation | Cretaceous | |
| Kysyl Formation | Jurassic | |
| Kyundeiskaya Suite Formation | Permian | |
| Kyzyl Formation | Permian | |
| Kzylsai Formation | Triassic | |
| Kzylsaiskaya Formation | Triassic | |
| Labaz Formation | Cambrian | |
| Lamtsa Formation | Ediacaran | |
| Layiol' Formation | Devonian | |
| Lazarevsky Formation | Carboniferous | |
| Lazurnaya Formation | Triassic | |
| Lazurnaya Bay Formation | Triassic | |
| Lebyazh'ya Formation | Cambrian | |
| Left Kedon Formation | Triassic | - |
| Lek Formation | Permian | |
| Lek Formation | Permian | |
| Lek Formation | Permian | |
| Lekskaya Suite Formation | Permian | |
| Lekvorkuta Formation | Permian | |
| Lekvorkutskaya Formation | Permian | |
| Leskovskaya Formation | Cretaceous | - |
| Lestanshor Formation | Triassic | |
| Levashi Formation | Cretaceous | |
| Limimtevayamskaya Formation | Neogene | |
| Limptekon Formation | Permian | |
| Lingula and Upper Coal Suites Formation | Jurassic | |
| Lingula Suite Formation | Jurassic | |
| Lipovskaya Formation | Triassic | |
| Livny Formation | Devonian | |
| Loglorskaya Suite Formation | Permian | |
| Loparskii Formation | Ordovician | |
| Lower Abrekskaya Suite Formation | Permian | |
| Lower Akhmatov Suite Formation | Carboniferous | |
| Lower Beshui Suite Formation | Jurassic | |
| Lower Dunaiskaya Suite Formation | Permian | |
| Lower Dzhaskoi Suite Formation | Jurassic | |
| Lower Green Sand Formation | Cretaceous | |
| Lower Gusinozemelskaya Suite Formation | Permian | |
| Lower Kabaktinsk Suite Formation | Jurassic | |
| Lower Kamala Suite Formation | Jurassic | |
| Lower Kosyinskian Suite Formation | Permian | |
| Lower Krasnoyarka Subsuite Formation | Cretaceous | |
| Lower Matakan Suite Formation | Jurassic | |
| Lower Molchan Suite Formation | Jurassic | |
| Lower Namyndykan Suite Formation | Jurassic | |
| Lower Nazarovo Suite Formation | Jurassic | |
| Lower Osinniki and Tersyuk Suites Formation | Jurassic | |
| Lower Osinniki Suite Formation | Jurassic | |
| Lower Ozhogino Suite Formation | Jurassic | |
| Lower Pechorskaya Series Group/Intiskaya Suite Formation | Permian | |
| Lower Pospelovskaya Suite Formation | Permian | |
| Lower Saldam Suite Formation | Jurassic | |
| Lower Sandstone Formation | Jurassic | |
| Lower Shadoron Series Formation | Jurassic | |
| Lower Shangan Formation | Cambrian | |
| Lower Siyak Beds Formation | Devonian | |
| Lower Syurbelyakhskaya Suite Formation | Triassic | |
| Lower Talbonskaya Suite Formation | Triassic | |
| Lower Urgal Suite (Dublikan Suite) Formation | Jurassic | |
| Lower Variegated Suite Formation | Jurassic | |
| Lower Vilyui and Marykchan Suites Formation | Jurassic | |
| Lugov Formation | Permian | |
| Lugovskaya Suite Formation | Jurassic | |
| Lyaiol Formation | Devonian | |
| Lyaiol' Formation | Devonian | |
| Lynna Formation | Ordovician | |
| Lyudyanza Formation | Permian | |
| Machigarskaya Formation | Paleogene | |
| Magan Formation | Permian | |
| Magiveem Formation | Permian | |
| Magiveyen Formation | Permian | |
| Makarova Formation | Jurassic | |
| Makarovo Suite Formation | Jurassic | |
| Mal'tseva Formation | Permian | |
| Malinovyy Suite Formation | Jurassic | |
| Mallenskaya Formation | Paleogene | |
| Malobachat Formation | Devonian | |
| Malokinelskaya Formation | Permian | |
| Malotkhach Formation | Triassic | |
| Malyi Patok Formation | Devonian | |
| Malykai Formation | Cambrian | |
| Malyshevka Suite Formation | Jurassic | |
| Mangutskaya Formation | Cretaceous | |
| Mansiiski Formation | Ordovician | |
| Mansiiskii Formation | Ordovician | |
| Mansiysk Formation | Cambrian | |
| Manykay Formation | Cambrian | |
| Markha Formation | Cambrian | |
| Marshrutny Formation | Silurian | |
| Marsrutninskaya Formation | Permian | |
| Maruyamskaya Formation | Neogene | |
| Matitukskaya Formation | Neogene | |
| Matusevich Formation | Devonian | |
| Matusevich Suite Formation | Carboniferous | |
| Maut Formation | Silurian | |
| Medvezhin Formation | Cambrian | |
| Medvezhyn Formation | Cambrian | |
| Megen Formation | Permian | |
| Megion Formation | Cretaceous | |
| Melovatka Formation | Cretaceous | |
| Menkechen Formation | Permian | |
| Meschera Formation | Carboniferous | |
| Meychen Formation | Permian | |
| Mezen' Formation | Ediacaran | |
| Middle and Upper Volcanic Suite Formation | Jurassic | |
| Middle Dzhaskoi Suite Formation | Jurassic | |
| Middle Pereyaslovka Suite Formation | Jurassic | |
| Middle Siyak Beds Formation | Devonian | |
| Middle Talyndzhak Suite Formation | Jurassic | |
| Middle Tyttyg Formation | Jurassic | |
| Middle Yezo Formation | Cretaceous | |
| Mikhailov Formation | Carboniferous | |
| Mirsanovo Formation | Cretaceous | |
| Mirsanovskaya Formation | Cretaceous | |
| Mishkinskaya Formation | Carboniferous | |
| Mitina Formation | Permian | |
| Moguchan Formation | Permian | |
| Mol Formation | Permian | |
| Molskaya Formation | Permian | |
| Monom Formation | Triassic | |
| Morpin Formation | Permian | |
| Morzhov Formation | Triassic | |
| Morzhovaya Formation | Triassic | |
| Morzhovaya Bay Horizon Formation | Devonian | |
| Moskovoretskaya Formation | Jurassic | |
| Moyero River Formation | Ordovician | |
| Mugochan Formation | Permian | |
| Muker Formation | Ordovician | |
| Mukteiskii Formation | Ordovician | |
| Multicolored (variegated) Suite Formation | Jurassic | |
| Munugudzhak Formation | Permian | |
| Murtoi Formation | Cretaceous | |
| Muzdukh Suite Formation | Jurassic | |
| Mysa Ploskogo Formation | Neogene | |
| Mysa Tons Formation | Paleogene | |
| Mysovy Formation | Permian | |
| Nadkrasnokamenskaya Formation | Triassic | |
| Naiba Formation | Cretaceous | |
| Naibuchi Formation | Paleogene | |
| Naihoro Formation | Neogene | |
| Nam Formation | Permian | |
| Napanskaya Formation | Paleogene | |
| Narylkova Formation | Permian | |
| Naujoji Akmene Formation | Permian | |
| Naujoji Akmené Formation | Permian | |
| Nelynya Formation | Permian | |
| Nelyudim Formation | Devonian | |
| Nemda Formation | Permian | |
| Nemtsovskaya Series Formation | Triassic | |
| Nemtsovskaya Suite Formation | Triassic | |
| Nenyugin Formation | Permian | |
| Nerma Formation | Permian | |
| Nerminskaya Formation | Permian | |
| Neryungrikan Suite Formation | Jurassic | |
| Nevel'skaya Formation | Paleogene | |
| Nevelisk Group/Chekhovskaya Formation | Neogene | |
| Neverovo Formation | Carboniferous | |
| Nidimskaya Suite Formation | Triassic | |
| Nikitina Formation | Permian | |
| Niklekuyul'skaya Formation | Paleogene | |
| Nirudinskii Formation | Ordovician | |
| Nizhneduyskaya Formation | Paleogene | |
| Noginsky Formation | Carboniferous | |
| Novlenskoe Formation | Carboniferous | |
| Novlenskoye Beds Formation | Carboniferous | |
| Nutekin Formation | Triassic | |
| Nutov Group/Kaskadnaya Formation | Neogene | |
| Nutov Group/Nutovskaya Formation | Neogene | |
| Nya Formation | Ordovician | |
| Nyabol Formation | Permian | |
| Nyadeita Formation | Triassic | |
| Nyaiskii Formation | Ordovician | |
| Nytymokin Formation | Triassic | |
| Obukhovo Formation | Ordovician | |
| Okhonchevayamskaya Formation | Neogene, Paleogene | |
| Okobykay Group/Aleksandrovskaya Formation | Neogene | |
| Okobykay Group/Ekhabinskaya Formation | Neogene | |
| Okobykayskaya Formation | Neogene | |
| Ol'chan Formation | Permian | |
| Ol'khovskaya Formation | Paleogene | |
| Ola Formation | Cretaceous | |
| Olenek Formation | Cambrian | |
| Olynian Formation | Permian | |
| Ombinsk Formation | Neogene | |
| Omchak Formation | Permian | |
| Ommayskaya Formation | Paleogene | |
| Omolon Formation | Permian | |
| Onkhoidookskaya Suite Formation | Permian | |
| Opuonskoy Formation | Permian | |
| Or' Suite Formation | Jurassic | |
| Orlovka Formation | Permian | |
| Orol Formation | Permian | |
| Osakhta Formation | Permian | |
| Osakhtinskaya Formation | Permian | |
| Osezhina Suite Formation | Jurassic | |
| Osinniki and Tersyuk Suites Formation | Jurassic | |
| Osinniki Suite Formation | Jurassic | |
| Osinovo Formation | Jurassic | |
| Osinsky Formation | Cambrian | |
| Osipayskaya Formation | Triassic | |
| Oskhtinskaya Formation | Permian | |
| Ostrovnaya Formation | Cambrian | |
| Ovinparma? Formation | Devonian | |
| Oymuranskiy organogenic Formation | Cambrian | |
| Ozernaya Formation | Ordovician | |
| Ozerninskaya Formation | Permian | |
| Ozhogino Suite Formation | Jurassic | |
| Padimeytyvis Formation | Silurian | |
| Padun Formation | Ordovician | |
| Pakhachinskaya Formation | Neogene | |
| Pareni Formation | Permian | |
| Pastanakhskaya Group/Ystannakhskaya Formation | Triassic | |
| Pautovaya Formation | Permian | |
| Pechishchi Formation | Permian | |
| Pelskaya Formation | Permian | |
| Pelski Formation | Permian | |
| Pelyatka Formation | Permian | |
| Perekhodnaya Formation | Cambrian | |
| Perevoznaya Formation | Triassic | |
| Pereyaslovka Suite Formation | Jurassic | |
| Pereyaslovskaya Formation | Jurassic | |
| Peschanka Formation | Triassic | |
| Peshcherka Formation | Devonian | |
| Peski Formation | Carboniferous | |
| Peski Beds Formation | Carboniferous | |
| Pestrotsvet Formation | Cambrian | |
| Pestrotsvetnaya Formation | Neogene, Cambrian | |
| Petarkinskaya Formation | Permian | |
| Petropavlovka Formation | Triassic | |
| Petropavlovsk Formation | Silurian | |
| Petropavlovsk Suite Formation | Devonian, Silurian | |
| Pezhenka Suite Formation | Jurassic | |
| Pil'skaya Formation | Neogene | |
| Pilengskaya Formation | Paleogene | |
| Pionerskii Formation | Permian | |
| Pirda Formation | Triassic, Permian | |
| Pizhmomezenskoi Formation | Triassic | |
| Platonovskaya Formation | Cambrian | |
| Plavsk Formation | Devonian | |
| Pobedin Formation | Permian | |
| Pod'emnaya Formation | Devonian | |
| Poiga Formation | Ediacaran | |
| Poldarsa Formation | Permian | |
| Poludennaya Group/Aramon Formation | Ediacaran | |
| Poludennaya Group/Tyurim and Aramon Formation | Ediacaran | |
| Pomyr Group/Nutovskaya Formation | Neogene | |
| Pomyr Group/Pomyrskaya Formation | Neogene | |
| Pomyr Group/Uandi Formation | Neogene | |
| Pospelovo Formation | Permian | |
| Potokoiskaya Suite Formation | Permian | |
| Povorot Formation | Ordovician | |
| Pregolskian Formation | Permian | |
| Priargun Formation | Jurassic | |
| Pribrezhnaya Formation | Triassic | |
| Pribrezhninskaya Formation | Triassic | |
| Prisayan Formation | Jurassic | |
| Prisayan and Cheremkhovo Suites Formation | Jurassic | |
| Prisayan Suite Formation | Jurassic | |
| Privolynin Formation | Permian | |
| Promezhutochnaya Suite Formation | Permian | |
| Promyslovskaya Suite Formation | Jurassic | |
| Protvin Formation | Carboniferous | |
| Pudovkino Formation | Cretaceous | |
| Pushok Formation | Devonian | |
| Raiga Formation | Ediacaran | |
| Rakitinskaya Formation | Neogene | |
| Raspad and Abashevo Suites Formation | Jurassic | |
| Rateginskaya Formation | Paleogene | |
| Rdeyskoe Formation | Devonian | |
| Rechitsy Formation | Carboniferous | |
| Remnev Formation | Devonian | |
| Reshetnikovo Formation | Permian | |
| Rodionovskii Formation | Permian | |
| Romankol' Suite Formation | Jurassic | |
| Rudaceous continental red beds Formation | Permian | |
| Rusanov Formation | Devonian | |
| Rusavkino Formation | Carboniferous | |
| Rybinsk Formation | Triassic | |
| Rybushka Formation | Cretaceous | |
| Sabanakovian Formation | Permian | |
| Sablinskaya Formation | Cambrian | |
| Safonovski Formation | Devonian | |
| Sakha Formation | Permian | |
| Sakhana Formation | Permian | |
| Salairka Horizon Formation | Devonian | |
| Salarevo Formation | Permian | |
| Saldam Formation | Jurassic | |
| Saldam Suite Formation | Jurassic | |
| Samodi Formation | Cambrian | |
| Samojlovich Formation | Silurian | |
| Sanashtygol Limestone Formation | Cambrian | |
| Sanashtykgol Formation | Cambrian | |
| Sanashtykgol Limestone Formation | Cambrian | |
| Sandstone Suite Formation | Jurassic | |
| Sandstone Formation | Triassic | |
| Sandstone Formation | Jurassic | |
| Sandzhar Suite Formation | Jurassic | |
| Sangara Formation | Cretaceous | |
| Sangara Group/Khaya Formation | Jurassic | |
| Saraynin Formation | Devonian | |
| Sarga Formation | Permian | |
| Sarikamish Suite Formation | Jurassic | |
| Sartaki Suite Formation | Jurassic | |
| Sarydiirmen' Suite Formation | Jurassic | |
| Sasnava Formation | Permian | |
| Sauma Formation | Devonian | |
| Savel'evsk oil shales Formation | Jurassic | |
| Savina Formation | Permian | |
| Savinskaya Formation | Permian | |
| Schmidt Formation | Triassic | |
| Schwagerina Limestone Formation | Permian | |
| Sed'yu Formation | Devonian | |
| Sekmenevsk Formation | Cretaceous | |
| Semiluki Formation | Devonian | |
| Sergeyevsk suite Formation | Russian Federation | |
| ? Sergeyevsk Formation | Neogene | |
| Sertunayskaya Formation | Neogene | |
| Sette Formation | Russian Federation | |
| Severnaya Zemiya Formation | Devonian | |
| Seversk Sandstone Formation | Russian Federation | |
| Sezima Formation | Permian | |
| Sezimskaya Formation | Permian | |
| Sezymskaya Formation | Permian | |
| Shadoron Group/Takshin Formation | Jurassic | |
| Shadrovskaya Formation | Permian | |
| Shadrovskaya Suite Formation | Permian | |
| Shanda Horizon Formation | Devonian | |
| Shandinsk Formation | Devonian | |
| Shar'yu Formation | Permian | |
| Sheimo Formation | Permian | |
| Shemaha Formation | Silurian | |
| Sherkirtinskie Formation | Permian | |
| Sherlubai Formation | Devonian | |
| Shikhan Formation | Permian | |
| Shikhansk Formation | Permian | |
| Shivelig Formation | Cambrian | |
| Shoana Suite Formation | Jurassic | |
| Shubartau Formation | Devonian | |
| Shunet Formation | Devonian | |
| Sibiryakovskaya Formation | Devonian | |
| Sig Formation | Permian | |
| Sigskaya Formation | Permian | |
| Siltstone Formation | Jurassic | |
| Simbirskites Clay Formation | Cretaceous | |
| Sinegorskiy Formation | Paleogene | |
| Sinelnikov Horizon Formation | Devonian | |
| Sinigichan Formation | Permian | |
| Sinsk Formation | Cambrian | |
| Sinskoye Formation | Cambrian | |
| Siren Formation | Permian | |
| Siuransky Formation | Carboniferous | |
| Siyak Formation | Devonian | |
| Siyanovskaya Formation | Cretaceous | |
| Skosyrskaya Formation | Permian | |
| Sludka Formation | Triassic | |
| Snatol'skaya Formation | Paleogene | |
| Snatolskaya Formation | Paleogene | |
| Snatolskya Formation | Paleogene | |
| Snegurovka Formation | Cambrian | |
| Sogur Formation | Permian | |
| Sokolin Formation | Permian | |
| Sokolov Formation | Permian | |
| Soktui Formation | Permian | |
| Solikamsk Formation | Permian | |
| Solikamslian Formation | Permian | |
| Solonchan Formation | Carboniferous | |
| Solonchanskaya Formation | Permian | |
| Solonchatskaya Formation | Devonian | |
| Sos'va Suite Formation | Silurian | |
| Sosucheiskiy Formation | Permian | |
| Soubol Formation | Permian | |
| Spokojnaya Formation | Devonian | |
| Srednii Formation | Silurian | |
| Srednij Formation | Silurian | |
| Sredninskaya Formation | Silurian | |
| Staratel Formation | Permian | |
| Staritskaya Formation | Triassic | |
| Stashev Formation | Carboniferous | |
| Sterlitamak Formation | Permian | |
| Stoktysh Formation | Silurian | |
| Strojnaya Formation | Ordovician | |
| Suga Formation | Permian | |
| Sugoyakskaya Suite Formation | Triassic | |
| Sukhairkan Formation | Cambrian | |
| Sukharikha Formation | Cambrian | |
| Surkechan Formation | Carboniferous | |
| Suvorova Formation | Carboniferous | |
| Svyazuyushchinskaya Formation | Jurassic | |
| Syas Formation | Devonian | |
| Syrachoy Formation | Devonian | |
| Sysolskaya Suite Formation | Jurassic | |
| Syuransky Formation | Carboniferous | |
| Syuren Formation | Permian | |
| Syys Formation | Cambrian | |
| Syzran Formation | Paleogene | |
| Tab Formation | Permian | |
| Tab Formation | Permian | |
| Tabyo Formation | Permian | |
| Tadushi Formation | Paleogene | |
| Taganozhinskaya Suite Formation | Triassic | |
| Takamkyt Formation | Permian | |
| Takaradayskaya Formation | Paleogene | |
| Talata Formation | Permian | |
| Talatin Formation | Permian | |
| Talyndzhan Suite Formation | Jurassic | |
| Talynzhan Formation | Jurassic | |
| Tampeiskaya Group/Varengayakhinskaya Formation | Triassic | |
| Tanasha Suite Formation | Jurassic | |
| Tandoshinskaya Formation | Cambrian | |
| Taragaiskaya Suite Formation | Permian | |
| Tartalinskaya Formation | Triassic | |
| Taryn Formation | Cambrian | |
| Tas Formation | Permian | |
| Tashastinsky Formation | Carboniferous | |
| Tashly Formation | Carboniferous | |
| Taskuduk Suite Formation | Jurassic | |
| Taslaysk Formation | Silurian | |
| Tastuba Formation | Permian | |
| Tavda Formation | Paleogene | |
| Tayakhtakh Formation | Permian | |
| Tchertovskii Formation | Ordovician | |
| Teberden Formation | Permian | |
| Tergen Formation | Jurassic | |
| Tersinskaya Formation | Permian | |
| Tersyuk Suite Formation | Jurassic | |
| Tersyukskaya Formation | Jurassic | |
| Tetyukhinskaya Formation | Triassic | |
| Tignin Formation | Cretaceous | |
| Tinginskaya Formation | Cretaceous | |
| Tirekhtyakh Formation | Ordovician | |
| Tiryakh Formation | Permian | |
| Titan Formation | Permian | |
| Tkapravayamskaya Formation | Paleogene | |
| Tobizin Formation | Triassic | |
| Tokchikinskaya Formation | Jurassic | |
| Tol'ya Suite Formation | Jurassic | |
| Tolba Formation | Cambrian | |
| Tolbachan Formation | Cambrian | |
| Tolbuzino Suite Formation | Jurassic | |
| Toluyanskaya Formation | Devonian | |
| Tompinskaya Formation | Permian | |
| Tonasha Suite Formation | Jurassic | |
| Torgashino Formation | Cambrian | |
| Toshem Formation | Devonian | |
| Tsagayan Formation | Paleogene, Cretaceous | |
| Tsagayan Group/Udurchukan Formation | Cretaceous | |
| Tsvetkovomisskaya Suite Formation | Triassic | |
| Tsvetochni Formation | Permian | |
| Tugnuy Formation | Jurassic | |
| Tugnuy Suite Formation | Jurassic | |
| Tukalandy Formation | Cambrian | |
| Tula Formation | Carboniferous | |
| Tumara Formation | Permian | |
| Tumarin Formation | Permian | |
| Tumarinskaya Suite Formation | Permian | |
| Tumskaya Formation | Paleogene | |
| Tumul Formation | Triassic | |
| Tuor Formation | Triassic | |
| Tuorasis Formation | Permian | |
| Turabievo Formation | Carboniferous | |
| Turga Formation | Cretaceous | |
| Turgin Formation | Cretaceous | |
| Turginskaya Formation | Cretaceous | |
| Turinskaya Series Group/Bichurskaya Suite Formation | Triassic | |
| Turuzov Formation | Permian | |
| Tutuyas Suite Formation | Jurassic | |
| Tuyuc and Chaartash Suites Formation | Jurassic | |
| Tylakhskaya Formation | Carboniferous | |
| Tyrinskaya Formation | Permian | |
| Tyrma Suite Formation | Jurassic | |
| Tyumen Formation | Jurassic | |
| Tyumen' Suite Formation | Jurassic | |
| Tyuser Formation | Cambrian | |
| Tyuserian Formation | Cambrian | |
| Tyusersk Formation | Cambrian | |
| Tyushevskaya Formation | Paleogene | |
| Tyutyulen Formation | Devonian | |
| Uchama Formation | Triassic | |
| Uchulikan Formation | Cretaceous | |
| Uda Formation | Jurassic | |
| Uda Suite Formation | Jurassic | |
| Udinskaya Formation | Jurassic | |
| Ufim Formation | Permian | |
| Ufimskiy Formation | Permian | |
| Uglegor Group/Ausinskaya Formation | Neogene | |
| Ugodinskaya Formation | Permian | |
| Ugodinzin Formation | Permian | |
| Ugodinzinskaya Formation | Permian | |
| Ugorskii Formation | Ordovician | |
| Ugryumin Formation | Permian | |
| Ukhta Formation | Devonian | |
| Ukugut Suite Formation | Jurassic | |
| Ukurei Formation | Cretaceous | |
| Ulakhan Formation | Triassic | |
| Ulakhan Formation | Triassic | |
| Uldza Formation | Permian | |
| Undal Formation | Neogene | |
| Undino Formation | Jurassic | |
| Unel'skaya Formation | Paleogene | |
| Upper Abrekskaya Suite Formation | Permian | |
| Upper Akhmatov Formation | Permian | |
| Upper Barabashkaya Suite Formation | Permian | |
| Upper Cheremkhovo Suite Formation | Jurassic | |
| Upper Delenzhinskaya Suite Formation | Permian | |
| Upper Dep Suite Formation | Jurassic | |
| Upper Dulgalakhskaya Suite Formation | Permian | |
| Upper Dunaiskaya Suite Formation | Permian | |
| Upper Dunay Suite Formation | Permian | |
| Upper Dzhaskoi Suite Formation | Jurassic | |
| Upper Erbek Suite Formation | Jurassic | |
| Upper Gusinozemelskaya Suite Formation | Permian | |
| Upper Itat Suite Formation | Jurassic | |
| Upper Kabaktinsk Suite Formation | Jurassic | |
| Upper Kamala Suite Formation | Jurassic | |
| Upper Karakh Suite Formation | Jurassic | |
| Upper Katynadyr Suite Formation | Jurassic | |
| Upper Korkino Suite Formation | Jurassic | |
| Upper Kosyinskian Suite Formation | Permian | |
| Upper Makarovo Suite Formation | Jurassic | |
| Upper Monok Formation | Cambrian | |
| Upper Nazarovo Suite Formation | Jurassic | |
| Upper Osinniki Suite Formation | Jurassic | |
| Upper Porphyrite Suite Formation | Jurassic | |
| Upper Pospelovskaya Suite Formation | Permian | |
| Upper Sarydiirmen' Suite Formation | Jurassic | |
| Upper Shadoron Series Formation | Jurassic | |
| Upper Shangan Formation | Cambrian | |
| Upper Siyak Beds Formation | Devonian | |
| Upper Talyndzhak Suite Formation | Jurassic | |
| Upper Tanasha Suite Formation | Jurassic | |
| Upper Tumarinskaya Suite Formation | Permian | |
| Ura Formation | Ediacaran | |
| Uranayskaya Formation | Neogene | |
| Urminskaya Formation | Permian | |
| Urminskian Formation | Permian | |
| Urushten Formation | Permian | |
| Usa Formation | Cambrian | |
| Usatovo Formation | Cambrian | |
| Uskatskaya Formation | Permian | |
| Uslon Formation | Permian | |
| Usmanka and Uralovkino Suites Formation | Jurassic | |
| Uspenskaya Formation | Neogene | |
| Ust' Tagul Formation | Cambrian | |
| Ust'Formation | Jurassic | |
| Ust'Formation | Cretaceous | |
| Ust'Formation | Neogene | |
| Ust'Formation | Carboniferous, Devonian | |
| Ust'Formation | Silurian | |
| Ust'Formation | Jurassic | |
| Ust'irgisla Formation | Silurian | |
| Ust'irgisla Beds Formation | Silurian | |
| Ust'kundat Formation | Cambrian | |
| Ust Formation | Cretaceous | |
| Ust Formation | Ediacaran | |
| Ust Formation | Cambrian | |
| Uste Yarega Formation | Devonian | |
| Ustkarskaya Formation | Cretaceous | |
| Ustkarskaya Formation | Cretaceous | |
| Ustkut Regional Stage Formation | Ordovician | |
| Ustmylian Formation | Triassic | |
| Ustsarbaisky Formation | Carboniferous | |
| Usyatskata Formation | Permian | |
| Usyatskaya Suite Formation | Permian | |
| Utan Formation | Cretaceous | |
| Utanak Formation | Permian | |
| Utkholokskaya Formation | Paleogene | |
| Uyar Formation | Cambrian | |
| Uynin Group/Borskaya Formation | Neogene | |
| Valentinovskaya Formation | Permian | |
| Valnev Horizon Formation | Devonian | |
| Vartovskaya Formation | Cretaceous | |
| Vassino Formation | Devonian | |
| Vatutin Formation | Devonian | |
| Vavilov Formation | Devonian | |
| Vaygach Formation | Silurian | |
| Venev Formation | Carboniferous | |
| Venev ? Formation | Carboniferous | |
| Vengeriyskaya Formation | Neogene | |
| Verkhne Formation | Jurassic | |
| Verkhneduyskaya Formation | Neogene | |
| Verkhovka Formation | Ediacaran | |
| Verkhoyan Formation | Permian | |
| Veslyanskaya Suite Formation | Permian | |
| Vetlasyan Formation | Devonian | |
| Vetluga Group/Vokhma Formation | Triassic | |
| Vetlugian Series Formation | Triassic | |
| Viknorevskii Formation | Ordovician | |
| Vil'skaya Formation | Permian | |
| Viventekskaya Formation | Paleogene | |
| Vizhay Formation | Devonian | |
| Vladivostok Formation | Permian | |
| Vodopad Formation | Silurian | |
| Vokhma Formation | Triassic, Permian | |
| Vokhminskaya Formation | Triassic | |
| Volginskii Formation | Ordovician | |
| Volkhov Formation | Ordovician | |
| Volkhov Stage Formation | Ordovician | |
| Volonga Formation | Carboniferous | |
| Volzeia Beds Formation | Triassic | |
| Vorkutskoy Formation | Permian | |
| Voronin Beds Formation | Silurian | |
| Vostochnotaimyrskaya Formation | Triassic | |
| Vstrechnaya Formation | Devonian | |
| Vyasovka Formation | Permian | |
| Vyazniki Formation | Permian | |
| Vyazovka Formation | Permian | |
| Werblud Formation | Cretaceous | |
| West Khatanzeya Formation | Silurian | |
| Wilczek Formation | Triassic | |
| Yakutian Suite Formation | Jurassic | |
| Yaponskikh Kamney Formation | Neogene | |
| Yaptikshor Formation | Ordovician | |
| Yarenskian Group/Bogdo Formation | Triassic | |
| Yastrebovka Formation | Permian | |
| Yatyrgvarta Formation | Triassic | |
| Yezo Formation | Cretaceous | |
| Yorga Formation | Ediacaran | |
| Yrchakh Formation | Permian | |
| Ysmanakh Formation | Triassic | |
| Ystanakhskaya Formation | Triassic | |
| Ystannakh Formation | Triassic | |
| Yudoma Formation | Cambrian | |
| Yudomian Formation | Cambrian | |
| Yukhtinsk Suite Formation | Jurassic | |
| Yun'a Formation | Permian | |
| Yun'yun'vayamskaya Formation | Neogene | |
| Yunkyur Formation | Silurian | |
| Zabor'e Formation | Carboniferous | |
| Zadonsk Formation | Devonian | |
| Zagadochninskaya Formation | Devonian | |
| Zalgiris Formation | Permian | |
| Zarubino Formation | Devonian | |
| Zaza Formation | Cretaceous | |
| Zelenotsvetnaya Formation | Cambrian | |
| Zhakanskaya Formation | Triassic | |
| Zhandr Horizon Formation | Devonian | |
| Zhipkhosh Formation | Permian | |
| Zhipkosh Formation | Permian | |
| Zhitkov Formation | Triassic | |
| Zhuravlev Formation | Permian | |
| Zolotukhinskaya Formation | Cretaceous | |
| Zubova Formation | Devonian | |
| Zurmutinskaya Series Formation | Triassic | |
| Zvenkskaya Formation | Permian | |
| Zverinskaya Suite Formation | Permian | |
