= Wordian =

Sixth stage of the Permian

- 266.9 ± 0.4 – 264.28 ± 0.16 Ma

Chronology
← / Permian-Triassic mass extinction event; ← / end-Capitanian extinction event; ← / Olson's Extinction
Subdivision of the Permian according to the ICS, as of 2023. Vertical axis scale: Millions of years ago

Etymology
- Name formality: Formal

Usage information
- Celestial body: Earth
- Regional usage: Global (ICS)
- Time scale(s) used: ICS Time Scale

Definition
- Chronological unit: Age
- Stratigraphic unit: Stage
- Time span formality: Formal
- Lower boundary definition: FAD of the Conodont Jinogondolella aserrata
- Lower boundary GSSP: Guadalupe Pass, Guadalupe Mountains, Texas, USA; 31.8658°N 104.8328°W
- Lower GSSP ratified: 2001
- Upper boundary definition: FAD of the Conodont Jinogondolella postserrata
- Upper boundary GSSP: Nipple Hill, Guadalupe Mountains, Texas, USA; 31.9091°N 104.7892°W
- Upper GSSP ratified: 2001

In the geologic timescale, the Wordian is an age or stage of the Permian. It is the middle of three subdivisions of the Guadalupian Epoch or Series. The Wordian lasted between 266.9 and 264.28 million years ago (Ma). It was preceded by the Roadian and followed by the Capitanian.

== Stratigraphy ==
The Wordian Stage was introduced into scientific literature by Johan August Udden in 1916 and was named after the Word Formation of the North American Permian Basin. The Wordian was first used as a stratigraphic subdivision of the Guadalupian in 1961, when both names were still only used regionally in the southern US. The stage was added to the internationally used ISC timescale in 2001.

The base of the Wordian Stage is defined as the place in the stratigraphic record where fossils of conodont species Jinogondolella aserrata first appear. The global reference profile for this stratigraphic boundary is located at Getaway Ledge in the Guadalupe Mountains of Texas.

The top of the Wordian (the base of the Capitanian Stage) is defined as the place in the stratigraphic record where the conodont species Jinogondolella postserrata first appears.

The Wordian stage was part of the time in which the Zechstein was deposited in Europe.

=== Biostratigraphy ===
The Wordian spans the entire conodont biozone of Jinogondolella aserrata. It contains two fusulinid biozones:

- Zone of Afganella tereshkovae
- Zone of Neoschwagerina tenuis

== Wordian life ==
Olson’s Extinction, a worldwide loss of terrestrial vertebrate life occurred during the Early Guadalupian (Roadian, Wordian).

== Notable formations ==
- Gnishik Formation (Armenia, Azerbaidjan, Iran)
- Word Formation (Texas, United States)
