= 2017 in paleobotany =

This article records new taxa of plants that were described during the year 2017, as well as other significant discoveries and events related to paleobotany occurring in the year 2017.

== Ferns and fern allies ==
Name	Novelty	Status	Authors	Age	type locality	Location	Notes	Images
Annularia sardiniana	Sp. nov	Valid	Cleal et al.	Carboniferous (Moscovian)	San Giorgio Basin	Italy	A member of Equisetopsida.	
Annularia stopesiae	Sp. nov	Valid	Álvarez-Vázquez & Wagner	Carboniferous (Westphalian)		Canada (Nova Scotia)	An Annularia species.	
Arthropitys barthelii	Sp. nov	Valid	Neregato et al.	Permian	Parnaíba Basin	Brazil	A member of Calamitaceae.	
Arthropitys tocantinensis	Sp. nov	Valid	Neregato et al.	Permian	Parnaíba Basin	Brazil	A member of Calamitaceae.	
Asplenium sanshuiense	Sp. nov	Valid	Xu & Jin in Xu et al.	Early Eocene	Huachong Formation	China	A fern, a species of Asplenium.	
Azolla colhuehuapensis	Sp. nov	Valid	Vallati et al.	Late Cretaceous (Maastrichtian)	Lago Colhué Huapi Formation	Argentina	A member of Salviniales, a species of Azolla.	
Boweria nowarudensis	Sp. nov	Valid	Frojdová et al.	Carboniferous (early Moscovian)		Poland	A leptosporangiate fern belonging to the group Filicales.	
Claytosmunda chengii	Nom. nov	Valid	Bomfleur, Grimm & McLoughlin	Middle Jurassic		China	A member of the family Osmundaceae; a replacement name for Ashicaulis claytoniites Cheng (2011).	
Osmundastrum pulchellum	Comb. nov.	Valid	Bomfleur, Grimm & McLoughlin	Early Jurassic (Pliensbachian-Toarcian)	Djupadal Formation	Sweden	A member of Osmundaceae. Originally described as a species of Osmunda; transferred to the genus Osmundastrum.	Rhizome
Costatoperforosporites friisiae	Sp. nov	Valid	Mendes et al.	Early Cretaceous (late Aptian–early Albian)	Lusitanian Basin	Portugal	A member of Anemiaceae described on the basis of spores.	
Cystodium sorbifolioides	Sp. nov	Valid	Regalado et al.	Late Cretaceous (earliest Cenomanian)	Burmese amber	Myanmar	A fern belonging to the family Cystodiaceae.	Cystodium sorbifolioides
Goniophlebium macrosorum	Sp. nov	Valid	Xu & Zhou in Xu et al.	Miocene		China	A fern belonging to the family Polypodiaceae.	
Hymenophyllum iwatsukii	Sp. nov	Valid	Herrera et al.	Early Cretaceous		Mongolia	A filmy fern, a species of Hymenophyllum.	
Kidstoniopteris	Gen. et comb. nov	Valid	Frojdová et al.	Carboniferous (early Moscovian)		United Kingdom	A leptosporangiate fern belonging to the group Filicales; a new genus for "Boweria" minor Kidston (1923).	
Korallipteris alineae	Sp. nov	Valid	Conran et al.	Early Miocene		New Zealand	A fern.	
Lygodium goonyellum	Sp. nov	Valid	Rozefelds et al.	Oligocene–early Miocene		Australia	A species of Lygodium.	
Rhabdoxylon taiyuanense	Sp. nov	Valid	Ma, Wang & Sun	Early Permian	Taiyuan Formation	China	A fern belonging to the family Botryopteridaceae.	
Salvinia bogotensis	Sp. nov	Valid	Pérez-Consuegra et al.	Paleogene		Colombia	A species of Salvinia.	
Salvinia magdalenensis	Sp. nov	Valid	Pérez-Consuegra et al.	Paleogene		Colombia	A species of Salvinia.	

== Liverworts ==
Name	Novelty	Status	Authors	Age	type locality	Location	Notes	Images
Conocephalumites	Gen. et sp. nov	Valid	Wu & Guo in Guo et al.	Early Cretaceous	Yixian Formation	China	A liverwort belonging to the family Conocephalaceae. Genus includes new species C. hexagonites.	
Frullania pinnata	Sp. nov	Disputed	Heinrichs et al.	Late Cretaceous (Cenomanian)	Burmese amber	Myanmar	A liverwort, a species of Frullania. Li et al. (2021) considered it to be conspecific with Frullania baerlocheri.	
Frullania rovnoi	Sp. nov	Valid	Mamontov et al.	Eocene	Rovno amber	Ukraine	A liverwort, a species of Frullania.	
Lejeunea hamatiloba	Sp. nov	Valid	Lee et al.	Miocene	Dominican amber	Dominican Republic	A liverwort, a species of Lejeunea.	
Lejeunea resinata	Sp. nov	Valid	Lee et al.	Miocene	Dominican amber	Dominican Republic	A liverwort, a species of Lejeunea.	
Lejeunea urbanioides	Sp. nov	Valid	Lee et al.	Miocene	Dominican amber	Dominican Republic	A liverwort, a species of Lejeunea.	
Metzgerites multifidus	Sp. nov	Valid	Wu in Guo et al.	Early Cretaceous	Yixian Formation	China	A liverwort belonging to the family Metzgeriaceae.	
Pallaviciniites stricta	Sp. nov	Valid	Wu & Guo in Guo et al.	Early Cretaceous	Yixian Formation	China	A liverwort belonging to the family Pallaviciniaceae.	
Pellites	Gen. et sp. nov	Valid	Wu & Guo in Guo et al.	Early Cretaceous	Yixian Formation	China	A liverwort belonging to the family Pelliaceae. Genus includes new species P. latithallus.	
Protofrullania	Gen. et sp. nov	Valid	Heinrichs et al.	Cretaceous (Albian-Cenomanian)	Burmese amber	Myanmar	A liverwort belonging to the family Frullaniaceae. Genus includes new species P. cornigera.	
Radula cretacea	Sp. nov	Valid	Bechteler, Renner, Schäfer-Verwimp & Heinrichs in Bechteler et al.	Cretaceous (late Albian or early Cenomanian)	Burmese amber	Myanmar	A species of Radula liverwort	
Riccardiothallus palmata	Sp. nov	Valid	Wu & Guo in Guo et al.	Early Cretaceous	Yixian Formation	China	A liverwort belonging to the family Aneuraceae.	

== Lycophytes ==
Name	Novelty	Status	Authors	Age	type locality	Location	Notes	Images
Cymastrobus	Gen. et sp. nov	Valid	Evreïnoff et al.	Devonian (Famennian)	Mandowa Mudstone	Australia	A member of Lycopsida belonging to the group Isoetales. Genus includes new species C. irvingii.	
Lepidodendron vaselgense	Sp. nov	Valid	Anikeeva & Orlova in Orlova et al.	Late Carboniferous		Russia		
Lepidostrobus tevelevii	Sp. nov	Valid	Orlova, Mamontov & Anikeeva in Orlova et al.	Late Carboniferous		Russia		
Nothostigma	Gen. et comb. nov	Valid	Doweld	Carboniferous and Permian		Brazil; Egypt; India; Peru; Spain	A lycophyte. The type species is "Bothrodendron" pacificum Steinmann.	
Sengelia	Gen. et sp. nov	Valid	Matsunaga & Tomescu	Early Devonian	Beartooth Butte Formation	United States (Wyoming)	A lycophyte. Genus includes new species S. radicans.	
Sublepidodendron nelidovense	Sp. nov	Valid	Mosseichik in Mosseichik & Ignatiev	Carboniferous (Viséan)	Moscow Coal Basin	Russia (Tver Oblast)	A lycopod belonging to the group Lepidodendrales and the family Flemingitaceae.	
Sublepidodendron puchkoviorum	Sp. nov	Valid	Mosseichik in Mosseichik & Ignatiev	Carboniferous (Viséan)	Moscow Coal Basin	Russia (Tula Oblast)	A lycopod belonging to the group Lepidodendrales and the family Flemingitaceae.	
Tenellisporites antarcticus	Sp. nov	Valid	Cantrill in Cantrill, Ashworth & Lewis	Early Miocene		Antarctica	A lycopod belonging to the group Isoetales described on the basis of megaspores.	
Ulodendron ulianovii	Sp. nov	Valid	Mosseichik in Mosseichik & Ignatiev	Carboniferous (Viséan)	Moscow Coal Basin	Russia (Tver Oblast)	A lycopod belonging to the group Lepidodendrales and the family Flemingitaceae.	

== Ginkgoales ==
Name	Novelty	Status	Authors	Age	Unit	Location	Notes	Images
Baiera triassica	Nom. nov	Valid	Gnaedinger & Zavattieri	Late Triassic	Paso Flores Formation	Argentina	A replacement name for Baiera taeniata Geinitz (1876) (preoccupied).	
Ginkgo hamiensis	Sp. nov	Valid	Wang & Sun in Wang et al.	Middle Jurassic	Xishanyao Formation	China	A species of Ginkgo.	
Ginkgo neimengensis	Sp. nov	Valid	Xu et al.	Early Cretaceous	Huolinhe Formation	China	A species of Ginkgo.	
Nagrenia leviana	Sp. nov	Valid	Nosova	Middle Jurassic	Angren Formation	Uzbekistan	A member of Ginkgoales.	
Nagrenia pilosa	Sp. nov	Valid	Nosova	Middle Jurassic	Angren Formation	Uzbekistan	A member of Ginkgoales.	
Pseudotorellia crista	Sp. nov	Valid	Horiuchi & Uemura	Paleocene	Minato Formation	Japan	A member of Ginkgoales, described on the basis of leaves.	
Pseudotorellia kimurae	Sp. nov	Valid	Horiuchi & Uemura	Paleocene	Minato Formation	Japan	A member of Ginkgoales, described on the basis of leaves.	
Sphenobaiera eximia	Sp. nov	Valid	Na, Sun & Wang in Na et al.	Middle Jurassic	Daohugou Beds	China		

== Cycads ==
Name	Novelty	Status	Authors	Age	Unit	Location	Notes	Images
Eobowenia	Gen. et comb. nov	Valid	Coiro & Pott	Early Cretaceous (Aptian)	Anfiteatro de Ticó Formation	Argentina	A cycad belonging to the family Zamiaceae and the subfamily Bowenioideae; a new genus for "Almargemia" incrassata Archangelsky (1966).	
Oxfordiana	Gen. et sp. nov	Valid	Spencer & Hilton in Spencer et al.	Jurassic (latest Callovian to earliest Oxfordian)	Oxford Clay Formation	United Kingdom	A cycad. Genus includes new species O. motturii.	
Zamuneria	Gen. et sp. nov	Valid	Martínez et al.	Late Cretaceous	Mata Amarilla Formation	Argentina	A cycad belonging to the family Zamiaceae. Genus includes new species Z. amyla.	

== Conifers ==
Name	Novelty	Status	Authors	Age	Unit	Location	Notes	Images
Cathaya vanderburghii	Sp. nov	Valid	Gossmann ex Winterscheid & Gossmann	Pliocene		Germany; Italy	A species of Cathaya.	
Cupressinocladus guyangensis	Sp. nov	Valid	Jin & B.N. Sun in Jin et al.	Early Cretaceous	Guyang Formation	China	A member of Cupressaceae sensu lato.	
Cupressinoxylon artabeae	Sp. nov	Valid	Ruiz et al.	Paleocene (Danian)	Salamanca Formation	Argentina	A member of Cupressaceae described on the basis of fossil wood.	
Cupressinoxylon rotundum	Sp. nov	Valid	Pujana in Pujana, Raffi & Olivero	Late Cretaceous	Santa Marta Formation	Antarctica (James Ross Island)		
Elatocladus heerianus	Sp. nov	Valid	Nosova & Kiritchkova in Nosova, Kiritchkova & Kostina	Middle Jurassic (Aalenian-Bajocian)	Prisayan Formation	Russia	A conifer.	
Krassilovidendron	Gen. et sp. nov	Valid	Sokolova, Gordenko & Zavialova	Cretaceous (Albian–Cenomanian)		Russia (Kemerovo Oblast)	A member of Sequoioideae. Genus includes new species K. fecundum.	
Medulloprotaxodioxylon	Gen. et sp. nov	Valid	Wan et al.	Late Triassic (Norian)	Huangshanjie Formation	China	A conifer described on the basis of fossil wood, possibly an ancestral form of the Sequoioideae. Genus includes new species M. triassicum.	
Pararaucaria taquetrensis	Sp. nov	Valid	Escapa & Leslie	Early Jurassic		Argentina	A member of Cheirolepidiaceae.	
Pentakonos	Gen. et sp. nov	Valid	Herrera et al.	Early Cretaceous (Aptian-Albian)		Mongolia	A member of Cupressaceae. Genus includes new species P. diminutus.	
Pinus arunachalensis	Sp. nov	Junior homonym	Khan & Bera	Miocene	Dafla Formation	India	A pine. The name P. arunachalensis turned out to be preoccupied by Pinus arunachalensis Srivastava (2017); Khan & Bera (2018) coined a replacement name Pinus daflaensis.	
Pinus nanfengensis	Sp. nov	Valid	Wang et al.	Late Miocene	Xianfeng Basin	China	A pine.	
Pinus uniseriata	Sp. nov	Valid	Wang et al.	Late Miocene	Xianfeng Basin	China	A pine.	
Pityostrobus pluriresinosa	Sp. nov	Valid	Smith et al.	Early Cretaceous		United States (California)	A member of Pinaceae, a species of Pityostrobus.	
Platycladus tengchongensis	Sp. nov	Valid	Deng & Sun in Deng et al.	Late Pliocene	Mangbang Formation	China	A species of Platycladus.	
Podocarpoxylon multiparenchymatosum	Sp. nov	Valid	Pujana & Ruiz	Paleocene (Danian)-Eocene	Río Turbio Formation; Salamanca Formation	Argentina	A member of the family Podocarpaceae described on the basis of fossil wood.	
Podocarpoxylon prumnopityoides	Sp. nov	Valid	Gnaedinger et al.	Early Cretaceous (Valanginian)	Mulichinco Formation	Argentina	A member of the family Podocarpaceae described on the basis of fossil wood.	
Podozamites doludenkoae	Sp. nov	Valid	Nosova, van Konijnenburg-van Cittert & Kiritchkova	Early and Middle Jurassic (Toarcian-Bajocian)	Karadiirmen' Formation; Kokala Formation	Kazakhstan	A conifer belonging to the family Podozamitaceae, described on the basis of leaves.	
Podozamites irkutensis	Sp. nov	Valid	Nosova, van Konijnenburg-van Cittert & Kiritchkova	Middle Jurassic (Aalenian-Bajocian)	Prisayan Formation	Russia	A conifer belonging to the family Podozamitaceae, described on the basis of leaves.	
Retrophyllum spiralifolium	Sp. nov	Valid	Wilf in Wilf et al.	Eocene	La Huitrera Formation	Argentina	A species of Retrophyllum.	
Retrophyllum superstes	Sp. nov	Valid	Wilf in Wilf et al.	Late Cretaceous (Maastrichtian)	Lefipán Formation	Argentina	A species of Retrophyllum.	
Scarburgia baiyanghensis	Sp. nov	Valid	Yang et al.	Middle Jurassic	Xishanyao Formation	China	Possibly a member of Podocarpaceae.	
Storgaardia gansuensis	Sp. nov	Valid	Li & Wu in Li et al.	Middle Jurassic (Aalenian-Bajocian)	Yan'an Formation	China	A member of Coniferales, a species of Storgaardia.	
Stutzeliastrobus	Gen. et sp. nov	Valid	Herrera et al.	Cretaceous (Aptian-Cenomanian)		Czech Republic; Mongolia	A member of Cupressaceae. Genus includes new species S. foliatus, as well as "Cyparissidium" bohemicum Bayer (1914).	

== Other seed plants ==
Name	Novelty	Status	Authors	Age	Unit	Location	Notes	Images
Adiantites tevelevii	Sp. nov	Valid	Orlova, Pustovoit & Anikeeva	Carboniferous (Viséan)		Russia	A seed fern.	
Allicospermum papillosum	Sp. nov	Valid	Nosova & Hvalj	Middle Jurassic		Uzbekistan	A gymnosperm seed, possibly of ginkgoalean affinity.	
Allicospermum uzbekistanicum	Sp. nov	Valid	Nosova & Hvalj	Middle Jurassic		Uzbekistan	A gymnosperm seed.	
Allicospermum valentinae	Sp. nov	Valid	Nosova & Hvalj	Middle Jurassic		Uzbekistan	A gymnosperm seed, possibly of ginkgoalean affinity.	
Caytonanthus rewaensis	Sp. nov	Valid	Prakash & Das	Early Cretaceous	Bansa Formation	India	A seed fern belonging to the family Caytoniaceae.	
Dicroidium bandelii	Sp. nov	Valid	Abu Hamad et al.	Permian	Umm Irna Formation	Jordan	A seed fern. Originally described as a species of Dicroidium, but subsequently transferred to the genus Jordaniopteris.	
Ductoagathoxylon	Gen. et sp. nov	Valid	Wan et al.	Permian (Wuchiapingian)	Wutonggou Formation	China	A conifer described on the basis of fossilized wood. Genus includes new species D. jimsarensis.	
Ephedra canterata	Sp. nov	Valid	Puebla et al.	Early Cretaceous (Aptian)	La Cantera Formation	Argentina	A species of Ephedra.	
Gigantopteridium utebaturianum	Sp. nov	Valid	Koll, DiMichele & Manchester	Permian	Waggoner Ranch Formation	United States (Texas)	A gigantopterid.	
Hydropterangium roesleri	Sp. nov	Valid	Van Konijnenburg-van Cittert et al.	Late Triassic (Rhaetian)		Germany	Pollen organ of a plant of uncertain affinities. Originally described as a species of Hydropterangium; Shi et al. (2024) transferred it to the genus Harrisiothecium.	
Kizelopteris	Gen. et sp. nov	Valid	Naugolnykh	Carboniferous (Viséan)	Kizel Coal Basin	Russia	A seed fern belonging to the family Callistophytaceae. Genus includes new species K. flexuosa .	
Liaoningia	Gen. et sp. nov	Valid	Yang & Lin in Yang et al.	Early Cretaceous	Yixian Formation	China	A member of Gnetophyta showing intermediate morphology between the Ephedraceae, Gnetaceae and Welwitschiaceae. Genus includes new species L. decussata.	
Nilssonia gristhorpensis	Sp. nov	Valid	Van Konijnenburg-van Cittert et al.	Middle Jurassic (Bajocian)	Cloughton Formation	United Kingdom		
Nubilora	Gen. et sp. nov	In press	Wang	Late Triassic (Norian or Rhaetian)	Ganhaizi Formation	China	A possible relative of the flowering plants. Genus includes new species N. triassica.	
Partitisporites krassilovii	Sp. nov	Valid	Schrank	Early Cretaceous (Albian)		Israel	A gymnosperm described on the basis of fossil pollen.	
Patokaea	Gen. et sp. nov	Valid	Pacyna, Barbacka & Zdebska in Pacyna et al.	Late Triassic (Norian)	Grabowa Formation	Poland	A member of Voltziales belonging to the new family Patokaeaceae. Genus includes new species P. silesiaca.	
Protognetum	Gen. et sp. nov	Valid	Yang, Xie & Ferguson	Middle Jurassic		China	A member of Gnetales. Genus includes new species P. jurassicum.	
Scytophyllum karamayense	Sp. nov	Valid	He et al.	Late Triassic	Karamay Formation	China	A peltaspermalean seed fern.	
Sphenarion angustae	Sp. nov	Valid	Huang et al.	Middle Jurassic	Jiulongshan Formation	China	A member of Czekanowskiales, a species of Sphenarion.	
Tatarina? furcata	Sp. nov	Valid	Gomankov in Gomankov, Kiuntzel & Meyen	Late Permian		Russia	A seed fern belonging to the family Peltaspermaceae.	
Tatarina raristomata	Sp. nov	Valid	Gomankov in Gomankov, Kiuntzel & Meyen	Late Permian		Russia	A seed fern belonging to the family Peltaspermaceae.	
Turpanopitys	Gen. et sp. nov	Valid	Shi et al.	Early Triassic	Turpan Basin	China	A member of Coniferophyta of uncertain phylogenetic placement. Genus includes new species T. taoshuyuanense.	
Umaltolepis mongoliensis	Sp. nov	Valid	Herrera et al.	Early Cretaceous (Aptian–Albian)	Tevshiin Govi Formation	Mongolia	A member of Vladimariales (a group of seed plants of uncertain phylogenetic placement).	
Yangquanoxylon	Gen. et sp. nov	Valid	Wan et al.	Carboniferous (Pennsylvanian)-early Permian	Taiyuan Formation	China	A gymnosperm described on the basis of fossil wood. Genus includes new species Y. miscellum.	

== Other plants ==
Name	Novelty	Status	Authors	Age	type locality	Location	Notes	Images
Ahnetia	Gen. et sp. nov	Valid	Decombeix & Galtier	Carboniferous (late Tournaisian)		Algeria	Genus includes new species A. conradii	
Baragwanathia brevifolia	Sp. nov	Junior homonym	Kraft & Kvaček	Late Silurian	Požáry Formation	Czech Republic	An aquatic precursor of dry land lycophytes. The name is preoccupied by Baragwanathia brevifolia Hundt (1952); Kraft & Kvaček (2021) coined a replacement name Baragwanathia brevifolioides.	
Barattoloporellopsis	Gen. et comb. nov	Valid	Granier, Azerêdo & Ramalho	Late Jurassic (Oxfordian)		Portugal	A green alga, probably a primitive member of the family Dasycladaceae; a new genus for "Cylindroporella" lusitanica Ramalho (1970).	
Dorsalistachya	Gen. et sp. nov	Valid	Wang & Spencer in Wang et al.	Permian (Wuchiapingian–Changhsingian)	Xuanwei Formation	China	A member of Noeggerathiales. Genus includes new species D. quadrisegmentorum	
Douaphyton	Gen. et sp. nov	Valid	Xu et al.	Devonian (Givetian)	Hujiersite Formation	China	An early euphyllophyte. Genus includes new species D. levigata	
Draconisella mortoni	Sp. nov	Valid	Granier in Granier & Lethiers	Early Cretaceous (Hauterivian or Barremian)		Oman	A green alga belonging to the group Dasycladales and the family Triploporellaceae.	
Enigmodiscus	Gen. et sp. nov	Valid	Meyen in Gomankov, Kiuntzel & Meyen	Late Permian		Russia	A plant of uncertain phylogenetic placement, described on the basis of rounded or slightly elongated discs bearing a system of dark strokes. Genus includes new species E. multistriatus.	
Grododowon	Gen. et sp. nov	Valid	Strother in Strother et al.	Ordovician	Kanosh Shale	United States (Utah)	A green alga belonging to the group Charophyta. Genus includes new species G. orthogonalis.	
Hastipellis	Gen. et sp. nov	Valid	Meyen in Gomankov, Kiuntzel & Meyen	Late Permian		Russia	A plant of uncertain phylogenetic placement, probably a bryophyte, described on the basis of oval or egg-shaped sheets formed by two systems of cells. Genus includes new species H. dvinensis.	
Ilfeldia gregoriensis	Sp. nov	Valid	Pšenička et al.	Carboniferous (Gzhelian)	Douro Carboniferous Basin	Portugal	A plant of uncertain phylogenetic placement; may be affiliated with ferns or pteridosperms.	
Lamprothamnium? barcinencis	Sp. nov	Valid	De Sosa Tomas, Vallati & Martín-Closas	Early Cretaceous (late Aptian–early Albian)	Cerro Barcino Formation	Argentina	A green alga belonging to the group Charophyta.	
Meantoinea	Gen. et sp. nov	Valid	Bippus et al.	Early Cretaceous		Canada (British Columbia)	A moss belonging to the family Polytrichaceae. Genus includes new species M. alophosioides.	
Ovulepteris	Gen. et comb. nov	Valid	Pšenička et al.	Carboniferous (Pennsylvanian)		Czech Republic	A plant of uncertain phylogenetic placement; may be affiliated with ferns or pteridosperms. A new genus for "Ilfeldia" robusta Obrhel (1957) and "Ilfeldia" lobecensis Obrhel (1965).	
Scenedesmus texanus	Sp. nov	Valid	Benson, Miller & Wood	Late Jurassic	Bossier Formation	United States (Texas)	A green alga, a species of Scenedesmus	
Selliporella cornutuformis	Sp. nov	Valid	Sokač & Grgasović	Middle Jurassic		Croatia	A green alga belonging to the group Dasycladales.	
Teruelia	Gen. et sp. nov	Valid	Cascales-Miñana & Gerrienne	Devonian (Lochkovian–Pragian)	Nogueras Formation	Spain	An early polysporangiophyte. Genus includes new species T. diezii	
Triploporella ? edgelli	Sp. nov	Valid	Maksoud, Granier & Azar	Early Cretaceous (latest Barremian–earliest Aptian)		Lebanon	A green alga belonging to the group Dasycladales.	
Volkhoviella	Gen. et sp. nov	Valid	Naugolnykh	Middle Ordovician		Russia	A putative land plant, possibly a member of Rhyniales. Genus includes new species V. primitiva.	
Wiartonella	Gen. et sp. nov	Valid	LoDuca & Tetreault	Silurian	Eramosa Lagerstätte	Canada (Ontario)	An alga belonging to the group Dasycladales. Genus includes new species W. nodifera.	
Xinicaulis	Gen. et sp. nov	Valid	Xu et al.	Devonian (Frasnian)	Zhumulate Formation	China	A member of Cladoxylopsida. Genus includes new species X. lignescens.	
Yuhania	Gen. et sp. nov	Valid	Liu & Wang	Middle Jurassic (Callovian)	Jiulongshan Formation	China	Originally described as an early angiosperm; Herendeen et al. (2017) considered the holotype specimen to be inadequately preserved for critical assessment of the relationships of the taxon. Genus includes new species Y. daohugouensis.	

== Flowering plants ==
Name	Novelty	Status	Authors	Age	Unit	Location	Notes	Images
Acer ningmingensis	Sp. nov	Valid	Chen & Wong in Chen et al.	Oligocene	Ningming Formation	China	A maple.	
Aceroxylon pravalense	Sp. nov	Valid	Iamandei & Iamandei	Miocene		Romania	A member of the subfamily Hippocastanoideae within the family Sapindaceae described on the basis of fossil wood.	
Aceroxylon zarandense	Sp. nov	Valid	Iamandei & Iamandei	Miocene		Romania	A member of the subfamily Hippocastanoideae within the family Sapindaceae described on the basis of fossil wood.	
Aglaia siwalica	Sp. nov	Valid	Prasad et al.	Miocene		India	A species of Aglaia.	
Akanioxylon	Gen. et sp. nov	Valid	Brea et al.	Miocene (Burdigalian)	Santa Cruz Formation	Argentina	A member of Akaniaceae. Genus includes new species A. santacrucensis.	
Albizia ningmingensis	Sp. nov	Valid	Ma et al.	Oligocene	Ningming Formation	China	A species of Albizia.	
Aleurites australis	Sp. nov	Valid	Rozefelds et al.	Cenozoic		Australia	A species of Aleurites.	
Allopanax	Nom. et comb nov	Valid	Doweld	Eocene	Green River Formation	United States	A member of the Araliales a replacement name for Araliophyllum MacGinitie (1969). The type species is A. quinus	
Anacardium incahausi	Sp. nov	Valid	Woodcock, Meyer & Prado	Eocene	Piedra Chamana Fossil Forest	Peru	A species of Anacardium.	
Andiroxylon aegyptiacum	Sp. nov	Valid	El-Saadawi et al.	Oligocene		Egypt	A member of Fabaceae.	
Andiroxylon barghoornii	sp. nov.		Jud in Jud & Dunham	Oligocene-Miocene	Santiago Formation	Panama	A Fabaceae wood morphospecies.	
Annona miocenica	Sp. nov	Valid	Prasad et al.	Miocene		India	A species of Annona.	
Aralia asiatica	Nom. nov	Valid	Doweld	Miocene		Russia (Tomsk Oblast)	A species of Aralia; a replacement name for Aralia rugosa Dorofeev.	
Aralia borealis	Nom. nov	Valid	Doweld	Miocene		Russia (Tomsk Oblast)	A species of Aralia; a replacement name for Aralia tertiaria Dorofeev.	
Aralia wetteravica	Nom. nov	Valid	Doweld	Miocene		Germany	A species of Aralia; a replacement name for Aralia dubia (Ettingshausen, 1868).	
Aralia mammuthica	Nom. nov	Valid	Doweld	Miocene		Russia (Sakha Republic)	A species of Aralia; a replacement name for Aralia dubia Nikitin (1976).	
Aralia tobolica	Nom. nov	Valid	Doweld	Miocene		Russia (Omsk Oblast)	A species of Aralia; a replacement name for Aralia lucida Dorofeev (1963).	
Arceuthobium conwentzii	Sp. nov	Valid	Sadowski et al.	Eocene (Lutetian- Priabonian)	Baltic amber	Russia; Kaliningrad	A species of Arceuthobium mistletoe.	
Arceuthobium groehnii	Sp. nov	Valid	Sadowski et al.	Eocene; Priabonian	Baltic amber	Russia; Kaliningrad	A species of Arceuthobium mistletoe.	
Arceuthobium johnianum	Comb. nov	Valid	(Göppert & Berendt) Sadowski et al.	Eocene (Lutetian- Priabonian)	Baltic amber	Baltic Sea coast	A species of Arceuthobium mistletoe. First named as Ephedrites johnianus (1845); Moved from Ephedra johniana (1853) Moved to Patzea johniana (1886); Moved to Arceuthobium johnianum (2017). Type material was declared lost	Arceuthobium johnianum
Arceuthobium mengeanum	Comb. nov	Valid	(Göppert) Sadowski et al.	Eocene (Lutetian- Priabonian)	Baltic amber	Baltic Sea coast	A species of Arceuthobium mistletoe. First named as Ephedra mengeana 1883; Moved from Patzea mengeana 1886. Type material was declared lost	Arceuthobium mengeanum
Arceuthobium obovatum	Sp. nov	Valid	Sadowski et al.	Eocene (Lutetian- Priabonian)	Baltic amber	Baltic Sea coast	A species of Arceuthobium mistletoe.	
Arceuthobium viscoides	Comb. nov	Valid	(Göppert & Berendt) Sadowski et al.	Eocene; Priabonian	Baltic amber	Russia; Kaliningrad	A species of Arceuthobium mistletoe. Moved from Enantioblastos viscoides 1845.	
Archaestella	Gen. et sp. nov	Valid	Takahashi, Herendeen & Xiao	Late Cretaceous (early Coniacian)	Futaba Group	Japan	Possibly a relative of Trochodendraceae. Genus includes new species A. verticillata.	
Atalantia siwalica	Sp. nov	Valid	Prasad et al.	Miocene		India	A species of Atalantia.	
Avicennia sexiensis	Sp. nov	Valid	Woodcock, Meyer & Prado	Eocene	Piedra Chamana Fossil Forest	Peru	A species of Avicennia.	
Baccaurea miocenica	Sp. nov	Valid	Prasad et al.	Miocene		India	A species of Baccaurea.	
Balanites siwalica	Sp. nov	Valid	Prasad et al.	Miocene		India	A species of Balanites.	
Bastardiopsis palaeodensiflora	Sp. nov	Valid	Ramos, Brea & Kröhling	Late Pleistocene	El Palmar Formation	Argentina	A species of Bastardiopsis.	
Bauhinia purniyagiriensis	Sp. nov	Valid	Prasad et al.	Miocene		India	A species of Bauhinia.	
Beilschmiedia oleifera	sp. nov.		Jud in Jud & Dunham	Oligocene-Miocene	Santiago Formation	Panama	A species of Lauraceae	
Betula erkovetskiensis	Sp. nov	Valid	Blokhina & Bondarenko	Miocene	Sazanka Formation	Russia (Amur Oblast)	A birch.	
Boreopanax	Gen. et comb. nov	Valid	Doweld	Early Cretaceous		Russia	A member of Araliales; a new genus for "Araliaecarpum" kolymense Samylina (1960).	
Bosquesoxylon	Gen. et sp. nov	Valid	Pérez-Lara, Castañeda-Posadas & Estrada-Ruiz	Eocene	El Bosque Formation	Mexico	A member of Anacardiaceae described on the basis of fossil wood. Genus includes new species B. chiapiasense.	
Brassaiopsis kolakovskyana	Nom. nov	Valid	Doweld	Pliocene		Abkhazia	A species of Brassaiopsis; a replacement name for Aralia angustiloba Kolakovsky.	
Bridelia hanumanchattiensis	Sp. nov	Valid	Prasad et al.	Miocene		India	A species of Bridelia.	
Burseroxylon panamense	sp. nov.		Jud in Jud & Dunham	Oligocene-Miocene	Santiago Formation	Panama	A Sapindales wood morphospecies	
Caldesia europaea	Sp. nov	Valid	Hably in Hably & Meller	Miocene		Austria	A species of Caldesia.	
Calophyllum siwalikum	Sp. nov	Valid	Khan, Spicer & Bera in Khan et al.	Neogene		India	A species of Calophyllum.	
Cariniana valverdei	Sp. nov	Valid	Woodcock, Meyer & Prado	Eocene	Piedra Chamana Fossil Forest	Peru	A species of Cariniana.	
Carpolites drupifera	Sp. nov	Valid	Kowalski	Middle Miocene		Poland	A fossil fruit of uncertain phylogenetic placement.	
Carpolites lubstovensis	Sp. nov	Valid	Kowalski	Middle Miocene		Poland	A fossil fruit of uncertain phylogenetic placement.	
Cascolaurus	Gen. et sp. nov	Valid	Poinar	Late Cretaceous (Cenomanian)	Burmese amber	Myanmar	A member of Lauraceae. Genus includes new species C. burmitis.	
Cathiaria japonica	Sp. nov	Valid	Takahashi, Herendeen & Xiao	Late Cretaceous (early Coniacian)	Futaba Group	Japan	Possibly a member of Buxaceae sensu lato.	
Ceratopetalum edgardoromeroi	Sp. nov	Valid	Gandolfo & Hermsen	Eocene (Ypresian)	Laguna del Hunco Formation	Argentina	A species of Ceratopetalum.	
Chadronoxylon sakhalinensis	Sp. nov	Valid	Afonin	Late Cretaceous (Turonian–Coniacian)		Russia (Sakhalin Oblast)	A dicotyledon described on the basis of fossil wood.	
Chaneya ningmingensis	Sp. nov	Valid	Liufu, Chen & Wang	Oligocene	Ningming Formation	China	A fossil fruit.	
Choerospondias nanningensis	Sp. nov	Valid	Fu et al.	Late Oligocene	Yongning Formation	China	A species of Choerospondias.	
Chrysophyllum bhairauvensis	Sp. nov	Valid	Prasad et al.	Miocene		India	A species of Chrysophyllum.	
Cinnamomum camphoricarpum	Sp. nov	Valid	Doweld	Pliocene		Japan	A species of Cinnamomum.	
Cinnamomum camphoricum	Nom. nov	Valid	Doweld	Eocene		Indonesia	A species of Cinnamomum; a replacement name for Cinnamomum gracile (Geyler, 1877).	
Cinnamomum costulatum	Nom. nov	Valid	Doweld	Oligocene		France	A species of Cinnamomum described on the basis of fossil fruits; a replacement name for Cinnamomum apiculatum Saporta (1889).	
Cinnamomum fajumicum	Nom. nov	Valid	Doweld	Eocene (Bartonian)		Egypt	A species of Cinnamomum; a replacement name for Cinnamomum africanum Engelhardt (1907).	
Cladium zhenyuanensis	Sp. nov	Valid	Liang & Zhou in Liang et al.	Miocene		China	A species of Cladium.	
Clausena miocenica	Sp. nov	Valid	Prasad et al.	Miocene		India	A species of Clausena.	
Cnestis purniyagiriensis	Sp. nov	Valid	Prasad et al.	Miocene		India	A species of Cnestis.	
Combretum purniyagiriense	Sp. nov	Valid	Prasad et al.	Miocene		India	A species of Combretum.	
Connaroxylon	Gen. et sp. nov	Valid	Baas et al.	Late Cretaceous (Maastrichtian)-earliest Paleocene	Deccan Intertrappean Beds	India	A probable member of Connaraceae described on the basis of fossil wood. Genus includes new species C. dimorphum. Originally named in 2017 in a publication which did not fulfill all requirements of the International Code of Nomenclature of Algae, Fungi and Plants; subsequently validated in 2022.	
Cordia asenjoi	Sp. nov	Valid	Woodcock, Meyer & Prado	Eocene	Piedra Chamana Fossil Forest	Peru	A species of Cordia.	
Cordia eocenica	Sp. nov	Valid	Woodcock, Meyer & Prado	Eocene	Piedra Chamana Fossil Forest	Peru	A species of Cordia.	
Cordia florifera	Sp. nov	Valid	Woodcock, Meyer & Prado	Eocene	Piedra Chamana Fossil Forest	Peru	A species of Cordia.	
Cretacaeiporites aegyptiaca	Sp. nov	Valid	Ibrahim et al.	Late Cretaceous (Cenomanian)	Bahariya Formation	Egypt		
Cyclocarya simipaliurus	Sp. nov	Valid	Wu et al.	Late Miocene	Nanlin Formation	China	A species of Cyclocarya.	
Cynometra grandis	Sp. nov	Valid	Woodcock, Meyer & Prado	Eocene	Piedra Chamana Fossil Forest	Peru	A species of Cynometra.	
Dalbergia santa-rosa	Sp. nov	Valid	Woodcock, Meyer & Prado	Eocene	Piedra Chamana Fossil Forest	Peru	A species of Dalbergia.	
Dalbergia tanakpurensis	Sp. nov	Valid	Prasad et al.	Miocene		India	A species of Dalbergia.	
Dendrokingstonia palaeonervosa	Sp. nov	Valid	Prasad et al.	Miocene		India	A species of Dendrokingstonia.	
Derris mioscandens	Sp. nov	Valid	Prasad et al.	Miocene		India	A species of Derris.	
Dicotylophyllum subpeltatum	Sp. nov	Valid	Kvaček & Bubík	Oligocene		Iran	A flowering plant of uncertain phylogenetic placement described on the basis of leaf impressions.	
Diospyros communis	Nom. nov	Valid	Doweld	Tertiary		Indonesia	A species of Diospyros; a replacement name for Diospyros dubia Göppert (1854).	
Dipterocarpus miogracilis	Sp. nov	Valid	Prasad et al.	Middle Miocene	Siwalik Formation	India	A species of Dipterocarpus.	
Discoflorus	Gen. et sp. nov	Valid	Poinar	Eocene-Miocene	Dominican amber	Dominican Republic	A member of Apocynaceae belonging to the subfamily Asclepiadoideae. Genus includes new species D. neotropicus.	
Drimycarpus siwalicus	Sp. nov	Valid	Prasad et al.	Miocene		India	A species of Drimycarpus.	
Duguetiaxylon	Gen. et sp. nov	Valid	Soares et al.	Miocene	Novo Remanso Formation	Brazil	A member of the family Annonaceae described on the basis of fossil wood. Genus includes new species D. amazonicum.	
Enkianthus maii	Sp. nov	Valid	Kowalski	Middle Miocene		Poland	A species of Enkianthus.	
Euphorbioxylon crotonoides	sp. nov.		Jud in Jud & Dunham	Oligocene-Miocene	Santiago Formation	Panama	A Euphorbiaceae wood morphospecies	
Exbucklandia acutifolia	Sp. nov	Valid	Huang & Zhou in Huang et al.	Miocene		China	A species of Exbucklandia.	
Fallopia conwentzii	Nom. nov	Valid	Doweld	Eocene		Russia (Kaliningrad Oblast)	A species of Fallopia; a replacement name for Polygonum convolvuloides Conwentz.	
Fallopia palaeodonica	Sp. nov	Valid	Doweld	Miocene		Russia (Rostov Oblast)	A species of Fallopia.	
Ficus koek-noormaniae	sp. nov.		Jud in Jud & Dunham	Oligocene-Miocene	Santiago Formation	Panama	A wood morphospecies Ficus	
Foveomonocolpites ravnii	Sp. nov	Valid	Schrank	Early Cretaceous (Albian)		Israel	A flowering plant described on the basis of fossil pollen.	
Frangula priabonica	Sp. nov	Valid	Doweld	Eocene (Priabonian)	Headon Hill Formation	United Kingdom	A species of Frangula.	
Gomphandra palaeocoriacea	Sp. nov	Valid	Prasad et al.	Miocene		India	A species of Gomphandra.	
Gossweilerodendroxylon	Gen. et sp. nov	Valid	Ramos, Brea & Kröhling	Late Pleistocene	El Palmar Formation	Argentina	A member of Detarioideae described on the basis of fossil wood. Genus includes new species G. palmariensis.	
Grewia tanakpurensis	Sp. nov	Valid	Prasad et al.	Middle Miocene	Siwalik Formation	India	A species of Grewia.	
Humboldtia miocenica	Sp. nov	Valid	Prasad et al.	Miocene		India	A species of Humboldtia.	
Hura chancayensis	Sp. nov	Valid	Woodcock, Meyer & Prado	Eocene	Piedra Chamana Fossil Forest	Peru	A species of Hura.	
Hydrochariphyllum kvacekii	Sp. nov	Valid	Hably in Hably & Meller	Miocene		Austria	A member of the family Hydrocharitaceae.	
Icacinanthium	Gen. et sp. nov	Valid	Del Rio & De Franceschi in Del Rio, Haevermans & De Franceschi	Eocene (Ypresian)		France	A member of the family Icacinaceae. Genus includes new species I. tainiaphorum.	
Ilex miodipyrena	Sp. nov	Valid	Denk et al.	Miocene (early Burdigalian)	Güvem Formation	Turkey	A holly.	
Ixora purniyagiriensis	Sp. nov	Valid	Prasad et al.	Miocene		India	A species of Ixora.	
Jenkinsella conferta	Sp. nov	Valid	Golovneva & Alekseev	Late Cretaceous (Coniacian-Santonian)	Sym Formation	Russia	A Cercidiphyllaceae infructescence morphospecies.	
Jenkinsella filatovii	Comb. nov	Valid	(Samylina) Golovneva & Alekseev	Cretaceous; Albian	Omsukchan Formation	Russia	A Cercidiphyllaceae infructescence morphospecies. First named Kenella filatovii (1976); Moved from Nyssidium filatovii (2010)	
Jenkinsella gardnerii	Comb. nov	Valid	(Chandler) Golovneva & Alekseev	Paleocene	Wuyun Formation	China	A Cercidiphyllaceae infructescence morphospecies. Moved from Carpolithes gardnerii (1961) includes some Nyssidium arcticum of Crane (1984)	
Jenkinsella jiayinensis	Comb. nov	Valid	(Feng et al.) Golovneva & Alekseev	Paleocene	Wuyun Formation	China	A Cercidiphyllaceae infructescence morphospecies. Moved from Nyssidium jiayinense (2000)	
Jenkinsella knowltonii	Nom. nov	Valid	Golovneva & Alekseev	Paleocene		United States (Colorado)	A Cercidiphyllaceae infructescence morphospecies. A replacement name for Berrya racemosa (1930)	
Jenkinsella krassilovii	Sp. nov	Valid	Golovneva & Alekseev	Paleocene	Darmakan Formation	Russia (Amur Oblast)	A Cercidiphyllaceae infructescence morphospecies.	
Jenkinsella makulbekovii	Sp. nov	Valid	Golovneva & Alekseev	Paleocene	Naran-Bulak Formation	Mongolia	A Cercidiphyllaceae infructescence morphospecies.	
Jenkinsella vilyuensis	Sp. nov	Valid	Golovneva & Alekseev	Late Cretaceous (Turonian-Coniacian)	Timmerdyakh Formation	Russia	A Cercidiphyllaceae infructescence morphospecies.	
Kenilanthus	Gen. et sp. nov	Valid	Friis, Pedersen & Crane	Early Cretaceous (early-middle Albian)	Patapsco Formation	United States (Maryland)	A flowering plant belonging to an early-diverging eudicot lineage. The type species is Kenilanthus marylandensis.	
Kalmiocarpus	Gen. et sp. nov	Valid	Kowalski	Middle Miocene		Poland	A member of Ericaceae. Genus includes new species K. dorofeevi.	
Kownasia	Gen. et sp. nov	Valid	Kowalski	Middle Miocene		Poland	A member of Cyperaceae. Genus includes new species K. lubstovensis.	
Kunduriphyllum	Gen. et comb. nov	Valid	Kodrul & Maslova	Late Cretaceous (Campanian)	Kundur Formation	Russia (Amur Oblast)	A member of the family Platanaceae; a new genus for "Celastrinites" kundurensis Golovneva, Sun & Bugdaeva (2008).	
Lagerstroemia prakashii	Sp. nov	Valid	Prasad et al.	Miocene		India	A species of Lagerstroemia.	
Lagerstroemioxylon thanobolensis	Sp. nov	Valid	Soomro et al.	Miocene	Manchar Formation	Pakistan	A member of the family Lythraceae described on the basis of fossil wood.	
Laurinoxylon elongatum	sp. nov.		Jud in Jud & Dunham	Oligocene-Miocene	Santiago Formation	Panama	A Lauraceae wwod morphospecies	
Lecythioxylon enviraense	Sp. nov	Valid	Kloster, Gnaedinger & Adami-Rodrigues	Miocene	Solimões Formation	Brazil	A member of the family Lecythidaceae described on the basis of fossil wood.	
Leguminocarpon siwalicum	Sp. nov	Valid	Prasad et al.	Middle Miocene	Siwalik Formation	India	A member of Fabaceae.	
Lepisanthes miocenica	Sp. nov	Valid	Prasad et al.	Miocene		India	A species of Lepisanthes.	
Lepisanthes tanakpurensis	Sp. nov	Valid	Prasad et al.	Miocene		India	A species of Lepisanthes.	
Leucotrys	Gen. et sp. nov	Valid	Kowalski	Middle Miocene		Poland	A member of Ericaceae. Genus includes new species L. europea.	
Lyonia polonica	Sp. nov	Valid	Kowalski	Middle Miocene		Poland	A species of Lyonia.	
Macaranga zhangpuensis	Sp. nov	Valid	Wang & Sun in Wang et al.	Miocene	Fotan Group	China	A species of Macaranga.	
Machilus miovillosus	Sp. nov	Valid	Prasad et al.	Middle Miocene	Siwalik Formation	India	A species of Machilus.	
Mahonia ningmingensis	Sp. nov	Valid	Hu & Chen in Hu et al.	Oligocene	Ningming Formation	China	A species of Mahonia.	
Maiella	Gen. et sp. nov	Valid	Kowalski & Fagúndez	Miocene		Poland	A member of the family Ericaceae belonging to the tribe Ericeae. Genus includes new species M. miocaenica.	
Mallotus prejaponicus	Sp. nov	Valid	Prasad et al.	Miocene		India	A species of Mallotus.	
Mammea paramericana	Sp. nov	Valid	Nelson & Jud	Early Miocene		Panama	A species of Mammea.	
Mastixia asiatica	Sp. nov	Valid	Khan, Bera & Bera in Khan et al.	Miocene–Pleistocene		India	A species of Mastixia.	
Mastixia siwalika	Sp. nov	Valid	Khan, Bera & Bera in Khan et al.	Miocene–Pleistocene		India	A species of Mastixia.	
Medinilla siwalica	Sp. nov	Valid	Prasad et al.	Miocene		India	A species of Medinilla.	
Meiogyne purniyagiriensis	Sp. nov	Valid	Prasad et al.	Miocene		India	A species of Meiogyne.	
Metrosideros dawsonii	Sp. nov	Valid	Tarran et al.	Oligo-Miocene		Australia	A species of Metrosideros.	
Metrosideros wrightii	Sp. nov	Valid	Tarran et al.	Oligo-Miocene		Australia	A species of Metrosideros.	
Millettia mioinermis	Sp. nov	Valid	Prasad et al.	Miocene		India	A species of Millettia.	
Millettioxylon sindhiensis	Sp. nov	Valid	Soomro et al.	Miocene	Manchar Formation	Pakistan	A member of Fabaceae described on the basis of fossil wood.	
Mycophoris	Gen. et sp. nov	Valid	Poinar	Eocene to Miocene	Dominican amber	Dominican Republic	Originally described as a member of Orchidaceae, but this interpretation was challenged by Selosse et al. (2017). Genus includes new species M. elongatus.	
Myristica siwalica	Sp. nov	Valid	Prasad et al.	Miocene		India	A species of Myristica.	
Notiantha	Gen. et sp. nov	Valid	Jud et al.	Paleocene (early Danian)	Lower Salamanca Formation	Argentina	A member of the family Rhamnaceae. Genus includes new species N. grandensis.	
Nothodichocarpum	Gen. et sp. nov	Valid	Han, Liu & Wang	Early Cretaceous (Barremian-Aptian)	Yixian Formation	China	An early flowering plant. Genus includes new species N. lingyuanensis.	
Notonuphar	Gen. et sp. nov	Valid	Friis et al.	Eocene	La Meseta Formation	Antarctica (Seymour Island)	A water lily. Genus includes new species N. antarctica.	
Palaquium palaeograndis	Sp. nov	Valid	Prasad et al.	Miocene		India	A species of Palaquium.	
Panascleroticoxylon	Gen. et sp. nov	Valid	Rodriguez-Reyes et al.	Miocene (Burdigalian to Tortonian)	Alajuela Formation; Cucaracha Formation	Panama	A member of Malpighiales of uncertain phylogenetic placement, described on the basis of fossil wood. Genus includes new species P. crystallosa.	
Paracomptonia	Gen. et comb. nov	Valid	Doweld	Late Cretaceous (Cenomanian) to Oligocene (Rupelian)		Austria; Azerbaijan; Czech Republic; France	A member of Myricaceae; a new genus for "Dryandra" cretacea Velenovský (1883). Genus also includes "Dryandra" yakovlevii Palibin (1930) and "Aspleniopteris" schrankii Sternberg (1825).	
Paraoxystigma	Gen. et sp. nov	Valid	Ramos, Brea & Kröhling	Late Pleistocene	El Palmar Formation	Argentina	A member of Detarioideae described on the basis of fossil wood. Genus includes new species P. concordiensis.	
Paraphyllanthoxylon botarii	Sp. nov	Valid	Iamandei & Iamandei	Miocene		Romania	A member of the family Phyllanthaceae described on the basis of fossil wood.	
Paraphyllanthoxylon vancouverense	Sp. nov	Valid	Jud et al.	Late Cretaceous (Coniacian)	Comox Formation	Canada (British Columbia)	An angiosperm tree described on the basis of fossil wood.	
Parashorea mioplicata	Sp. nov	Valid	Prasad et al.	Miocene		India	A species of Parashorea.	
Passifloroidesperma	Gen. et sp. nov	Valid	Martínez	Late Eocene	Esmeraldas Formation	Colombia	A member of the family Passifloraceae. Genus includes new species P. sogamosense.	
Peltophoroxylon diversiradii	Sp. nov	Valid	Allen	Early Eocene	Bridger Formation	United States (Wyoming)	A member of Caesalpinioideae described on the basis of fossil wood.	
Persicaria omoloica	Sp. nov	Valid	Doweld	Miocene		Russia (Irkutsk Oblast)	A species of Persicaria.	
Persoonieaephyllum blackburniae	Sp. nov	Valid	Carpenter, Tarran & Hill	Middle Eocene		Australia	A member of the family Proteaceae belonging to the subfamily Persoonioideae.	
Phyllanthocarpon	Gen. et sp. nov	Valid	Mistri, Kapgate & Sheikh ex Kapgate & Manchester in Kapgate, Manchester & Stuppy	Late Cretaceous (late Maastrichtian)	Dhuma Formation	India	A member of Phyllanthaceae described on the basis of fossil fruit. Genus includes new species P. singpurensis.	
Physalis infinemundi	Sp. nov	Valid	Wilf et al.	Eocene		Argentina	A species of Physalis.	
Piranheoxylon perfectum	Sp. nov	Valid	Iamandei & Iamandei	Miocene		Romania	A member of the family Picrodendraceae described on the basis of fossil wood.	
Platanus serrata	Nom. nov	Valid	Doweld	Paleocene	Raton Formation	United States (Colorado)	A species of Platanus; a replacement name for Aralia serrata Knowlton (1917).	
Polygonum palaeosibiricum	Nom. nov	Valid	Doweld	Oligocene		Russia (Tomsk Oblast)	A species of Polygonum; a replacement name for Polygonum reticulatum Dorofeev.	
Popowia siwalica	Sp. nov	Valid	Prasad et al.	Miocene		India	A species of Popowia.	
Populus simonioides	Sp. nov	Valid	Doweld	Eocene		China	A species of Populus.	
Prioria canalensis	Sp. nov	Valid	Rodríguez-Reyes et al.	Miocene (Burdigalian)	Cucaracha Formation	Panama	A species of Prioria.	
Prioria elbaiae	Sp. nov	Valid	Woodcock, Meyer & Prado	Eocene	Piedra Chamana Fossil Forest	Peru	A species of Prioria.	
Prioria hodgesii	Sp. nov	Valid	Rodríguez-Reyes et al.	Miocene (Burdigalian)	Cucaracha Formation	Panama	A species of Prioria.	
Pseudowinterapollis africanensis	Sp. nov	Valid	Grímsson et al.	Early Miocene	Elandsfontyn Formation	South Africa	A member of Winteraceae described on the basis of fossil pollen.	
Pterolobium punctatopsis	Sp. nov	Valid	Jia et al.	Middle Miocene	Maguan Basin	China	A species of Pterolobium.	
Pyrus wischneideri	Sp. nov	Valid	Striegler	Late Miocene		Germany	A pear.	
Quercus wischgrundensis	Sp. nov	Valid	Striegler	Late Miocene		Germany	An oak.	
Randia tanakpurensis	Sp. nov	Valid	Prasad et al.	Miocene		India	A species of Randia.	
Rhizopalmoxylon nypoides	Sp. nov	Valid	Kathal et al.	Late Cretaceous–Paleocene (late Maastrichtian–early Danian)	Deccan Intertrappean Beds	India	A member of the family Arecaceae.	
Rhododendron polonicum	Sp. nov	Valid	Kowalski	Middle Miocene		Poland	A species of Rhododendron.	
Rosa miopannonica	Nom. nov	Valid	Doweld	Miocene		Austria	A rose; a replacement name for Rosa styriaca Kovar-Eder & Krainer (1988).	
Rourea blatta	Sp. nov	Valid	Jud & Nelson	Early Miocene	Cucaracha Formation	Panama	A member of the family Connaraceae.	
Rubus chandlerae	Nom. nov	Valid	Doweld	Eocene	Headon Hill Formation	United Kingdom	A species of Rubus; a replacement name for Rubus acutiformis Chandler (1925).	
Rubus fotjanovae	Nom. nov	Valid	Doweld	Miocene		Russia (Sakhalin Oblast)	A species of Rubus; a replacement name for Rubus alnifolius Fotjanova (1988).	
Rubus laticarpus	Nom. nov	Valid	Doweld	Miocene		Russia (Novosibirsk Oblast)	A species of Rubus; a replacement name for Rubus brevis Nikitin (2007).	
Rubus mammuthicus	Nom. nov	Valid	Doweld	Miocene		Russia (Sakha Republic)	A species of Rubus; a replacement name for Rubus decipiens Nikitin (1976).	
Rubus nikitinii	Nom. nov	Valid	Doweld	Miocene		Russia (Tomsk Oblast)	A species of Rubus; a replacement name for Rubus pygmaeus Nikitin (2007).	
Rubus novorossicus	Nom. nov	Valid	Doweld	Miocene		Ukraine	A species of Rubus; a replacement name for Rubus aralioides Negru (1986).	
Rubus tobolicus	Nom. nov	Valid	Doweld	Miocene		Russia (Novosibirsk Oblast)	A species of Rubus; a replacement name for Rubus minor Nikitin (2007).	
Sabalites geneseensis	Sp. nov	Valid	Greenwood & West	Early Paleocene	Scollard Formation	Canada (Alberta)	A palm tree belonging to the subfamily Coryphoideae.	
Sabalites guangxiensis	Sp. nov	Valid	Wang & Sun in Wang et al.	Oligocene	Ningming Formation	China	A palm tree.	
Sapindus eotrifoliatus	Sp. nov	Valid	Prasad et al.	Miocene		India	A species of Sapindus.	
Saportanthus	Gen. et 3 sp. nov	Valid	Friis, Crane & Pedersen	Early Cretaceous (late Barremian–early Albian)	Almargem Formation; Figueira da Foz Formation	Portugal	A flowering plant of uncertain affinities, possibly a member of Laurales or a sister taxon of monocots. Genus includes new species S. dolichostemon, S. brachystemon and S. parvus.	
Sapotaceoxylon	gen. et sp. nov.		Jud in Jud & Dunham	Oligocene-Miocene	Santiago Formation	Panama	A Sapotaceae wood morphospecies, type species S. penningtonii	
Sarcochlamys miopulcherrima	Sp. nov	Valid	Prasad et al.	Miocene		India	A species of Sarcochlamys.	
Saururus aquilae	Sp. nov	Valid	Grímsson, Grimm & Zetter	Late Cretaceous (Campanian)	Eagle Formation	United States (Wyoming)	A species of Saururus.	
Saururus stoobensis	Sp. nov	Valid	Grímsson, Grimm & Zetter	Miocene		Austria	A species of Saururus.	
Schima kwangsiensis	Sp. nov	Valid	Shi, Quan & Jin in Shi et al.	Late Oligocene	Yongning Formation	China	A species of Schima.	
Securidaca precorymbosa	Sp. nov	Valid	Prasad et al.	Miocene		India	A species of Securidaca.	
Sheltercarpa	Gen. et sp. nov	Valid	Atkinson, Stockey & Rothwell	Late Cretaceous (late Campanian)	Spray Formation	Canada (British Columbia)	A member of Cornales of uncertain phylogenetic placement. Genus includes new species S. vancouverensis.	
Smilax tengchongensis	Sp. nov	Valid	Wu et al.	Late Pliocene		China	A species of Smilax.	
Succinanthera	Gen. et sp. nov	Valid	Poinar & Rasmussen	Eocene	Baltic amber	Europe (Baltic Sea coast)	A member of Orchidaceae. Genus includes new species S. baltica.	
Suciacarpa xiangae	Sp. nov	Valid	Atkinson, Stockey & Rothwell	Late Cretaceous (late Campanian)	Spray Formation	Canada (British Columbia)		
Suessenia	Gen. et sp. nov	Valid	Jud et al.	Paleocene (early Danian)	Lower Salamanca Formation	Argentina	A member of the family Rhamnaceae. Genus includes new species S. grandensis.	
Symplocoxylon panamense	sp. nov.		Jud in Jud & Dunham	Oligocene-Miocene	Santiago Formation	Panama	An Ericales wood morphospecies	
Tabernaemontana moralesii	Sp. nov	Valid	Woodcock, Meyer & Prado	Eocene	Piedra Chamana Fossil Forest	Peru	A species of Tabernaemontana.	
Terminalia bhairauvensis	Sp. nov	Valid	Prasad et al.	Miocene		India	A species of Terminalia.	
Toddalia purniyagiriensis	Sp. nov	Valid	Prasad et al.	Miocene		India	A member of the family Rutaceae.	
Trochodendroides magadanica	Nom. nov	Valid	Golovneva in Golovneva et al.	Cretaceous		Russia	A member of Cercidiphyllaceae described on the basis of fossil leaves.	
Trochodendroides montana	Sp. nov	Valid	Alekseev in Golovneva et al.	Cretaceous		Russia	A member of Cercidiphyllaceae described on the basis of fossil leaves.	
Trochodendroides samyliniae	Nom. nov	Valid	Alekseev in Golovneva et al.	Cretaceous		Russia	A member of Cercidiphyllaceae described on the basis of fossil leaves.	
Tropidogyne pentaptera	Sp. nov	Valid	Poinar & Chambers	Cretaceous (Albian or Cenomanian)	Burmese amber	Myanmar	A probable member of Cunoniaceae.	
Typha asiatica	Nom. nov	Valid	Doweld	Oligocene		Kazakhstan	A species of Typha described on the basis of fossil seeds; a replacement name for Typha elongata Dorofeev (1982).	
Typha latissimisperma	Sp. nov	Valid	Doweld	Oligocene (Rupelian)	Bembridge Marls	United Kingdom	A species of Typha described on the basis of fossil seeds previously attributed to the species Typha latissima.	
Typha transdnestrovica	Nom. nov	Valid	Doweld	Miocene (Serravallian)		Transnistria	A species of Typha described on the basis of fossil seeds; a replacement name for Typha elliptica Negru (1972).	
Ventilago miocalyculata	Sp. nov	Valid	Prasad et al.	Miocene		India	A species of Ventilago.	
Wagatea miospicata	Sp. nov	Valid	Prasad et al.	Miocene		India	A member of the family Fabaceae.	
Xanthophyllum mioglaucum	Sp. nov	Valid	Prasad et al.	Miocene		India	A species of Xanthophyllum.	
Xylia siwalika	Sp. nov	Valid	Prasad et al.	Middle Miocene	Siwalik Formation	India	A species of Xylia.	
Zelkova ningmingensis	Sp. nov	Valid	Ma et al.	Oligocene	Ningming Formation	China	A species of Zelkova.	
Zlivifructus	Gen. et 2 sp. nov	Valid	Heřmanová, Dašková & Kvaček in Heřmanová et al.	Late Cretaceous (Turonian to Maastrichtian)	Aachen Formation; Klikov Formation; Walbeck Formation	Czech Republic; Germany	A member of the Normapolles complex described on the basis of fossil flowers and fruits. Genus includes new species Z. vachae and Z. sklenarii.	

== General research ==
- Bomfleur et al. (2017) also provide an evolutionary (phylogenetic, non-cladistic) classification in line with PPG I for all rhizome fossils of king ferns (Osmundales), which recognizes and describes two families with two subfamilies each (3 extinct, 1 extant), 13 extinct and six extant genera from the late Permian to now; the study includes as well an introduction into rhizome anatomy, a glossary of terminology, an analysis template (walkthrough) for placing new fossils, and a polytomous key to extinct and extant taxa.
- A specimen of the extant moss species Helicophyllum torquatum is described from the Miocene Dominican amber by Kubilius et al. (2017).
- A study on a deep, repetitive impression within a Devonian sandstone block recovered in a gravel quarry near Griffith (New South Wales, Australia) is published by McLean (2017), who considers the impression to be likely formed by the trunk or shed periderm of a large lycopsid.
- A study on the phylogenetic relationships of fossil seed plants based on data recovered from the fossil cuticles is published by Vajda et al. (2017).
- New fossils of the early seed plant Cosmosperma polyloba, providing new information making it possible to reconstruct the entire plant, are described from the Devonian (Famennian) Wutong Formation (China) by Liu et al. (2017).
- Description of fossil leaves of Plagiozamites oblongifolius from the upper Permian of southwest China (with well-preserved cuticles showing a combination of features typical for cycadaleans) is published by Feng et al. (2017).
- A study on the impact of a global warming event across the Triassic–Jurassic boundary on the ecological functioning of gymnosperm communities from East Greenland as indicated by the value of leaf mass per area is published by Soh et al. (2017).
- A diverse assemblage of petrified woods is described from the latest Cretaceous–earliest Paleocene of Deccan Intertrappean Beds (India) by Wheeler et al. (2017), who note the presence of anatomical features of the studied specimens that make the Deccan assemblage more similar to the recent Indian and other Paleotropical woods from Asia and Africa than with the latest Cretaceous and Paleocene woods from the rest of the world.
- A study on the diversity of insect herbivory on fossil angiosperm leaves from the Miocene Hindon Maar fossil lagerstätte (Otago, New Zealand) is published by Möller et al. (2017).
- Volatile organic compounds produced by members of the family Dipterocarpaceae are described from the Miocene amber from northeastern India by Dutta et al. (2017).
- A leaf fragment of a member of the fern family Lindsaeaceae of uncertain phylogenetic placement is described from the Cretaceous Burmese amber by Regalado et al. (2017).
- Several permineralised axes of the conifer wood Ningxiaites specialis with preserved beetle borings and beetle remains are described from the Permian (Changhsingian) Sunjiagou Formation (China) by Feng et al. (2017).
- A study on the tree rings in the early Permian gymnosperm wood from the Chemnitz petrified forest (Germany) is published by Luthardt & Rößler (2017), who interpret the findings as indicating the occurrence of the 11-year solar cycle.
- Conifer fossils preserving evidence of serotiny, interpreted as a fire-adaptive trait, are described from the Cretaceous (Cenomanian) Tupuangi Formation (Pitt Island, New Zealand) by Mays, Cantrill & Bevitt (2017).
- A leafy axis of the conifer Glenrosa carentonensis is described from the Cretaceous amber from France by Moreau et al. (2017).
- Fossil specimens of the golden larch preserving cuticles are described from the late Miocene Shengxian Formation (China) by Bai & Li (2017).
- A study on the stem and leaf anatomy of members of the families Cheirolepidiaceae (a member of the genus Pseudofrenelopsis of uncertain specific assignment) and Araucariaceae (Brachyphyllum obesum) known from the Lower Cretaceous (Aptian) Crato Formation (Brazil) is published by Batista et al. (2017).
- Peris et al. (2017) describe gymnosperm pollen preserved with a specimen of the false blister beetle species Darwinylus marcosi from the Cretaceous amber from Spain, and interpret the finding as indicating that false blister beetles originally were pollinators of gymnosperms (most likely cycads) before transitioning onto angiosperm hosts.
- A review of the fossil record and early evolution of five groups of brachyceran flies, discussing their probable ecological associations with early flowering plants, is published by Zhang & Wang (2017).
- Fossil pollen grains of members of the family Loranthaceae, preserving morphological features making it possible to assign the pollen to distinct lineages within the Loranthaceae, are described from the middle Eocene of the United States, Greenland, Central Europe and East Asia, and from the late Oligocene/early Miocene of Germany by Grímsson et al. (2017).
- Plant remains found in the Late Cretaceous (Maastrichtian) Lameta sediments and associated sauropod coprolites from the Nand-Dongargaon basin (Maharashtra, India) are described by Sonkusare, Samant & Mohabey (2017).
- A study on the impact of large herbivorous dinosaurs on global nutrient availability in the Cretaceous as indicated by remnant plant material (coal deposits) is published by Doughty (2017).
- A study on the molecular age of the earliest flowering plant lineages is published by Salomo et al. (2017), who recover the flowering plants as originating at the late Permian, ~275 million years ago.
