= Pinus arunachalensis =

Scientific classification
- Kingdom: Plantae
- Clade: Tracheophytes
- Clade: Gymnospermae
- Division: Pinophyta
- Class: Pinopsida
- Order: Pinales
- Family: Pinaceae
- Genus: Pinus
- Subgenus: P. subg. Strobus
- Section: P. sect. Quinquefoliae
- Subsection: P. subsect. Strobus
- Species: P. arunachalensis

Binomial name
- Pinus arunachalensis R.C.Srivastava, 2017

Synonyms
- Pinus parva (K.C.Sahni) R.C.Srivastava; Pinus wallichiana var. parva K.C.Sahni; Pinus wallichiana subsp. parva (K.C.Sahni) Silba; Pinus daflaensis Mahasin Ali Khan & Subir Bera

Species of conifer

Pinus arunachalensis is a species of large-sized conifer in the family Pinaceae.

It is native to the Arunachal Pradesh state of northeastern India, specifically near the towns or districts of Tawang and West Kameng in the eastern Himalayan Mountains, from which Pinus ravii is also found. The species range is located within a temperate climate. It has a smaller structure and size than Pinus wallichiana, but is larger than Pinus ravii.

== Etymology ==
The Latin epithet "arunachalensis" in Pinus arunachalensis was named for the state of Arunachal Pradesh, India.

It was originally listed under the now regarded synonym: Pinus parva (Pinus wallichiana var. parva), but the same scientific name was already taken for a fossil pine species, hence it was renamed and revised as such.
