= Popowia fusca =

Conservation status
- Least Concern (IUCN 3.1)

Scientific classification
- Kingdom: Plantae
- Clade: Embryophytes
- Clade: Tracheophytes
- Clade: Angiosperms
- Clade: Magnoliids
- Order: Magnoliales
- Family: Annonaceae
- Genus: Popowia
- Species: P. fusca

Binomial name
- Popowia fusca King

Species of tree

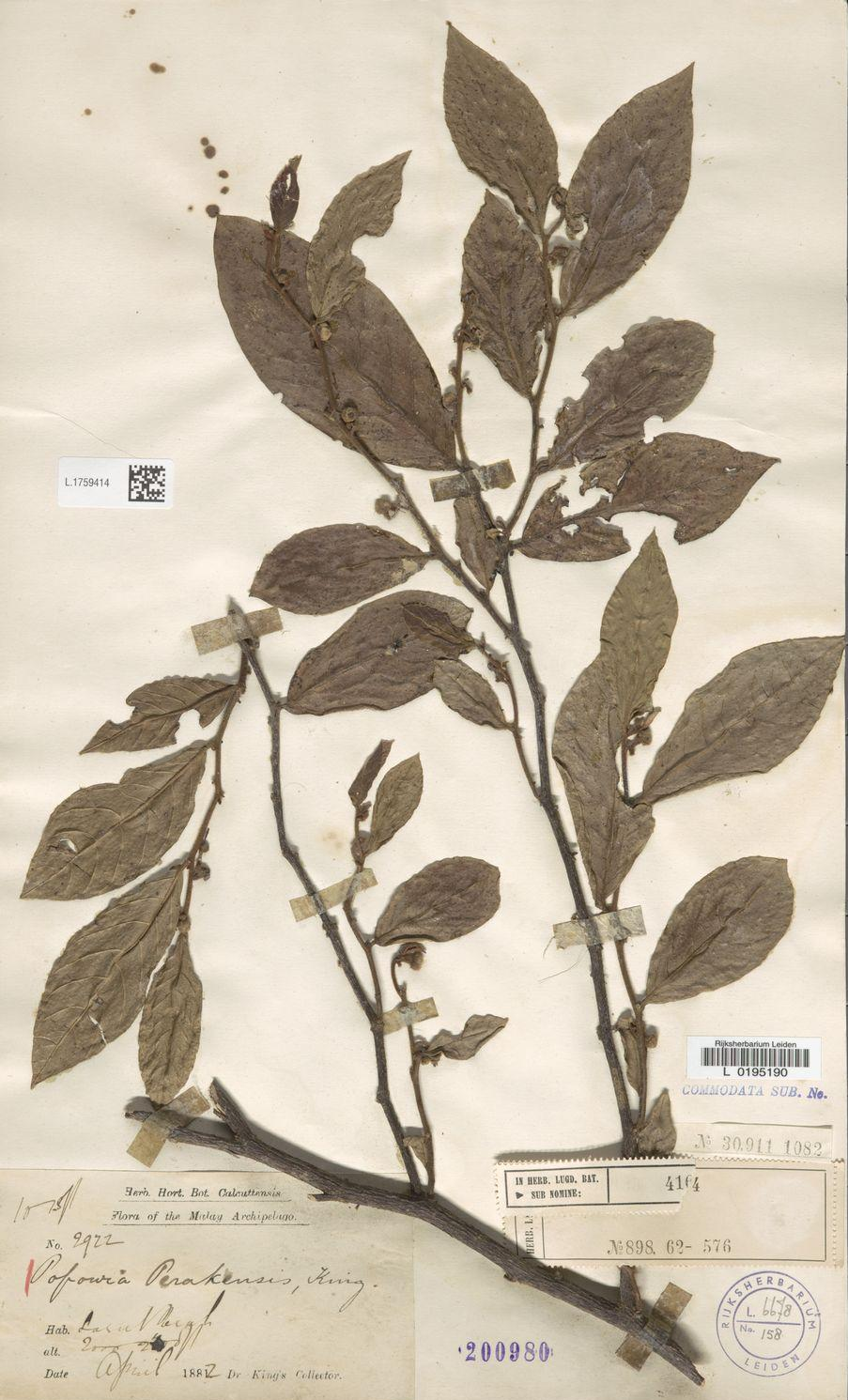
Popowia fusca

Popowia fusca is a species of flowering plant in the family Annonaceae. It is a tree native to Peninsular Malaysia, Peninsular Thailand, and Singapore.
