= Popowia pauciflora =

Conservation status
- Data Deficient (IUCN 3.1)

Scientific classification
- Kingdom: Plantae
- Clade: Embryophytes
- Clade: Tracheophytes
- Clade: Spermatophytes
- Clade: Angiosperms
- Clade: Magnoliids
- Order: Magnoliales
- Family: Annonaceae
- Genus: Popowia
- Species: P. pauciflora

Binomial name
- Popowia pauciflora Maingay ex Hook.f. & Thomson

Synonyms
- Ostodes helferi Müll.Arg

Species of tree

Popowia pauciflora is a species of plant in the family Annonaceae. It is a tree endemic to Peninsular Malaysia.
