= Popowia beddomeana =

Conservation status
- Endangered (IUCN 2.3)

Scientific classification
- Kingdom: Plantae
- Clade: Embryophytes
- Clade: Tracheophytes
- Clade: Spermatophytes
- Clade: Angiosperms
- Clade: Magnoliids
- Order: Magnoliales
- Family: Annonaceae
- Genus: Popowia
- Species: P. beddomeana

Binomial name
- Popowia beddomeana Hook.f. & Thomson

Species of flowering plant

Popowia beddomeana is a species of plant in the Annonaceae family. It is native to Kerala and Tamil Nadu in India.
