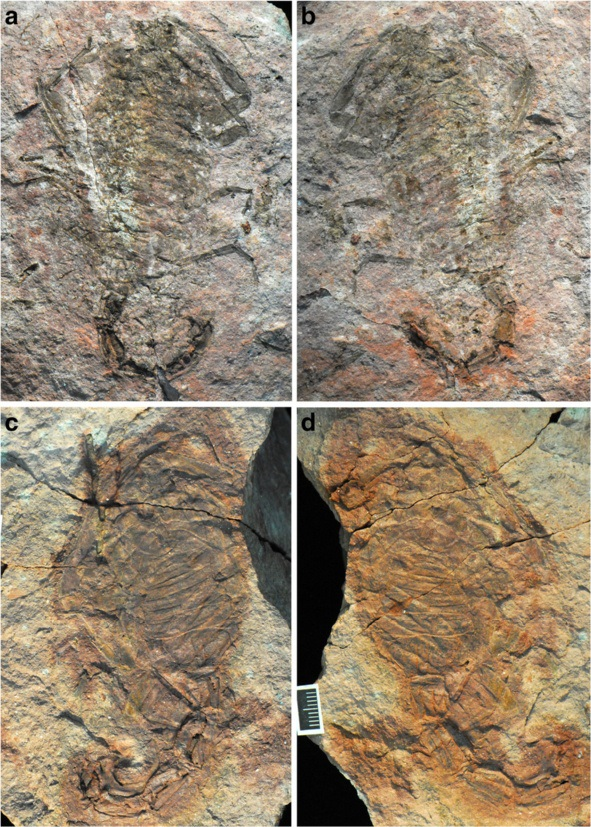
- Holotypes (A-B) and paratypes (C-D) of O. tungeri

Scientific classification
- Domain: Eukaryota
- Kingdom: Animalia
- Phylum: Arthropoda
- Subphylum: Chelicerata
- Class: Arachnida
- Order: Scorpiones
- Family: †Centromachidae
- Genus: †Opsieobuthus; Kjellesvig-Waering, 1986

Type species
- †Opsieobuthus pottsvillensis Kjellesvig-Waering, 1986

Species
- †O. pottsvillensis Kjellesvig-Waering, 1986; †O. tungeri Dunlop et al. 2016

= Opsieobuthus =

Opsieobuthus Temporal range: Late Carboniferous-Early Permian, Pennsylvanian–Sakmarian

Extinct genus of scorpions

Opsieobuthus is an extinct genus of centromachid scorpion. The type species O. pottsvillensis was named from the late Carboniferous of Clay City, Indiana. A second species ?O. tungeri was tentatively assigned to the genus from the Early Permian Chemnitz petrified forest in Germany.

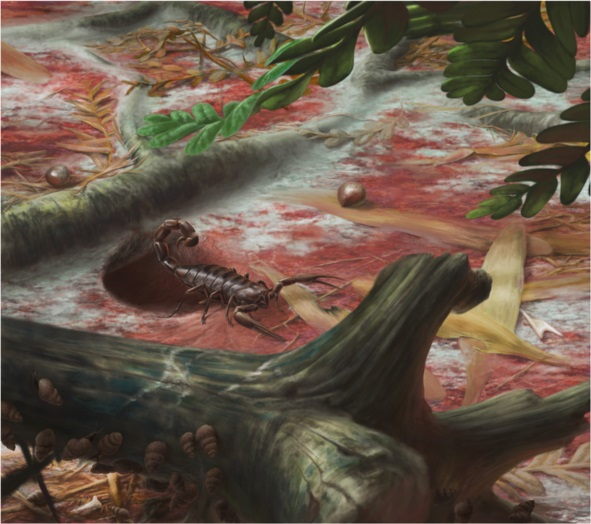
An artist's illustration of O. tungeri at the mouth of its burrow
