= Popowia velutina =

Conservation status
- Least Concern (IUCN 3.1)

Scientific classification
- Kingdom: Plantae
- Clade: Embryophytes
- Clade: Tracheophytes
- Clade: Spermatophytes
- Clade: Angiosperms
- Clade: Magnoliids
- Order: Magnoliales
- Family: Annonaceae
- Genus: Popowia
- Species: P. velutina

Binomial name
- Popowia velutina King

Species of tree

Popowia velutina is a species of flowering plant in the custard apple family, Annonaceae. It is a tree endemic to Peninsular Malaysia.
