= Kulturkaufhaus Tietz =

Cultural center in Zentrum, Germany

Coordinates: 50.8309°N 12.9233°E

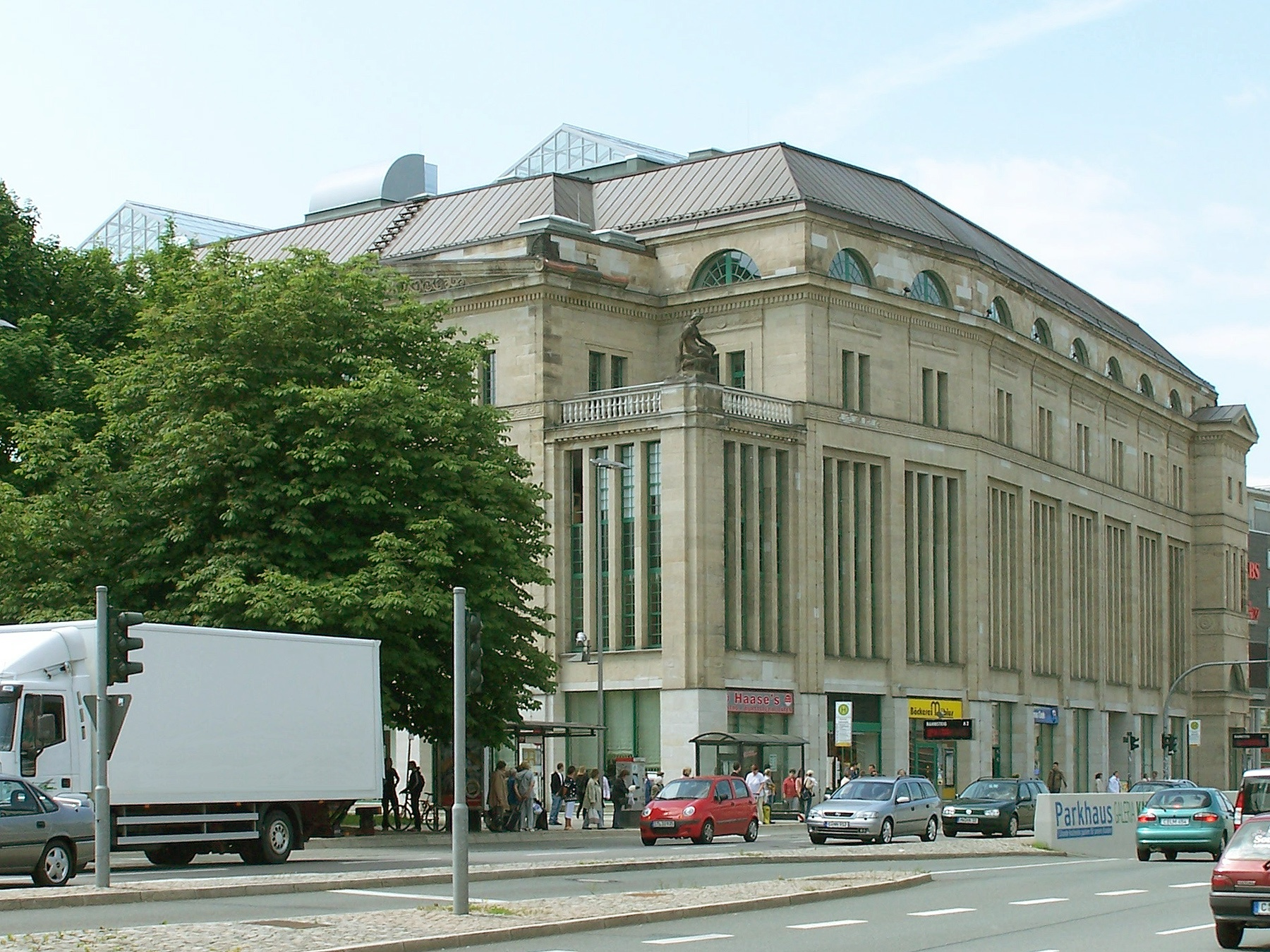
Culture department store DAStietz

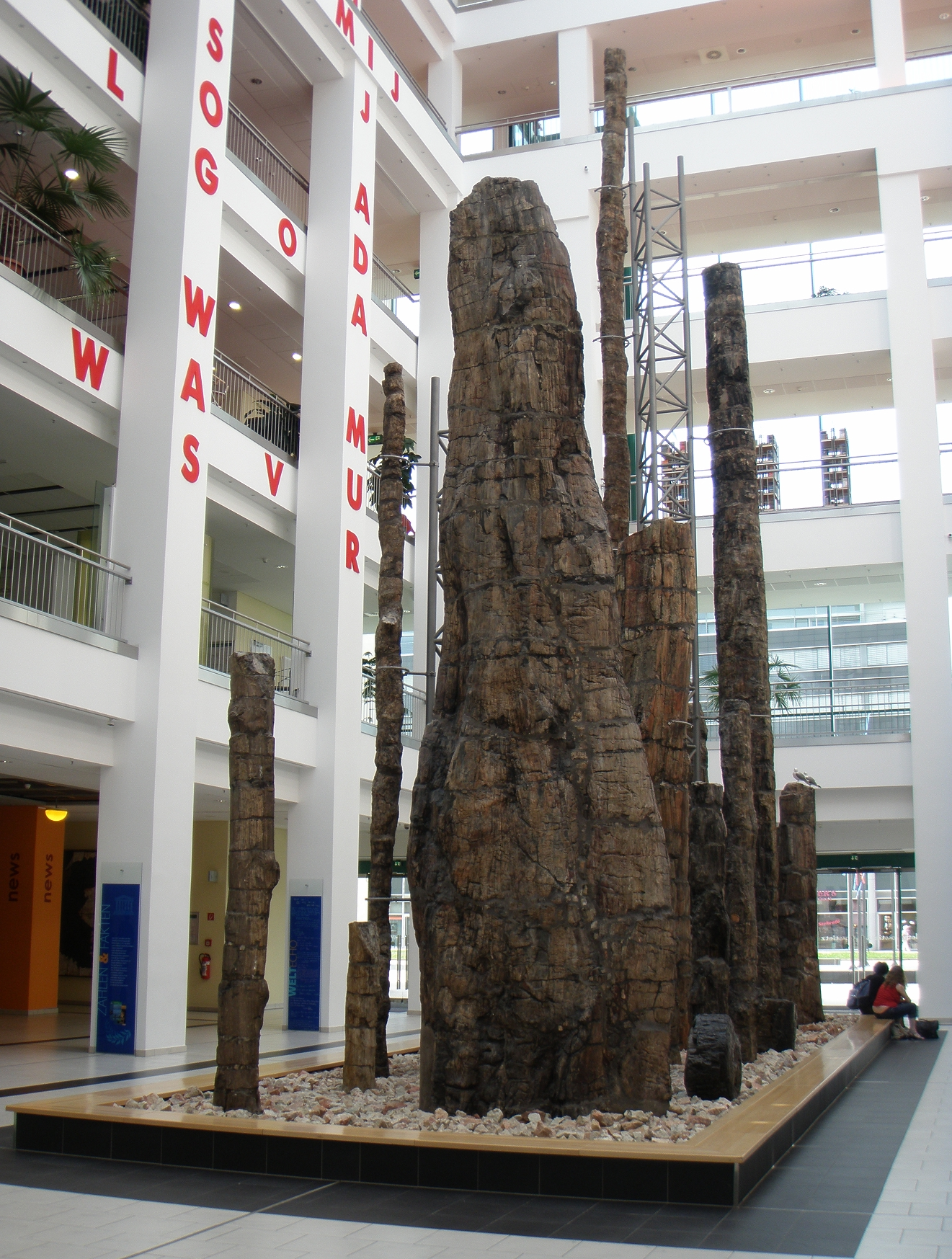
Petrified wood in courtyard

The Kulturkaufhaus Tietz is a cultural centre in Chemnitz, sometimes also called Cultural Department Store.

== History ==
In 1913 the house was built by Wilhelm Kreis. During World War II it was used as a department store by the Kaufhaus Tietz (Department Store of Tietz). In the 1990s the label Kaufhof had a shopping centre there. After a massive restoration of the building, in 2004 it was re-opened as "DAStietz". Since then it contains some shops (e.g. a bakery, a Fair Trade Shop, a bookshop and so on). Also the City Library of Chemnitz and the adult evening classes of the city, the Museum for Natural Education and the New Saxonian Gallery are located there.

The store's courtyard contains specimens from the Chemnitz petrified forest (largest plant fossil in Europe). Since 2020 a Stefan-Heym-exhibition is presented ("Stefan-Heym-Forum"). Stefan Heym (1913–2001) born in Chemnitz, was a German writer.
