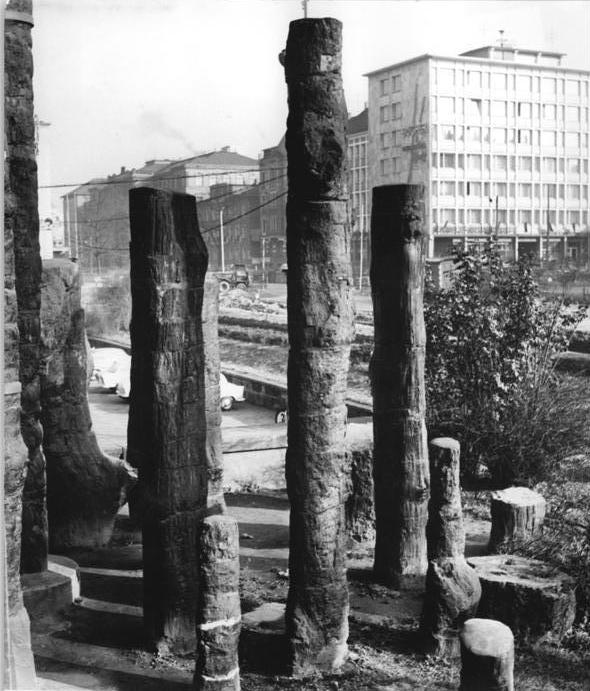
- A. bistriata fossils from Chemnitz in 1964

Scientific classification
- Kingdom: Plantae
- Clade: Tracheophytes
- Division: Polypodiophyta
- Class: Polypodiopsida
- Subclass: Equisetidae
- Order: Equisetales
- Family: †Calamitaceae
- Genus: †Arthropitys; Frenzel, 1751

Species
- A. bistriata Cotta, 1864 (type species); A. butiranensis Neregato et al., 2021; A. deltoides Cichan and Taylor, 1983; A. .sp; A. taoshuyuanensis Chen et al., 2018; A. raimundii Rößler et al., 2025

= Arthropitys =

Arthropitys Temporal range: Carboniferous–Early Triassic, 318.1–247.2 Ma Bashkirian–Olenekian

Extinct genus of ferns

Arthropitys is an extinct genus of calamitacean equisetale. The petrified fossils of Arthropitys bistriata, the type species, can be found in the Leukersdorf Formation, Chemnitz petrified forest, Chemnitz, Germany. The genus existed from the Carboniferous (Bashkirian) until the Early Triassic (Olenekian).

== History ==
The first remains of Arthropitys were discovered in the Leukersdorf Formation, Germany during the early 16th century and were described by Georgius Agricola (1494–1555) in 1546.

In the mid-18th century, gemstone prospector David Frenzel (1691–1772) found numerous examples of this wood in the hills in and around Chemnitz.

One of Frenzel's 1751 finds is one of the few petrified wood specimens still possessing its roots. Later a collector, the Hilbersdorf contractor Güldner, bequeathed some of the petrified logs to King Albert Museum in Chemnitz. The first director of the Museum, Johann Traugott Sterzel, took over the investigation of the findings. The Sterzeleanum in the museum (the petrified forest display) is dedicated to him.

The genus Arthropitys was named and described by Frenzel (1751) and the type species A. bistriata was named by Cotta (1864). The type locality for A. bistrata and A. sp. is the Chemnitz petrified forest.

From 4 April 2008, to Fall 2011, an excavation in Hilbersdorf was held to find and research more trunks. Their researchers discovered, amongst others, Arthropitys bistriata. Many more plants and animals from this excavation are still being used for ongoing research.

A. deltoides was named by Cichan and Taylor (1983) and was discovered in Kentucky.

A. taoshuyuanensis was named by Chen et al. (2018) from specimens found in the Wutonggou Formation of China.

A. buritiranensis was named by Neregato et al. (2021) from specimens found in the Motuca Formation of Brazil.

== Distribution ==
Specimens have also been discovered in Belgium, Brazil, China, Germany, Italy, the Netherlands, Russia, Spain, the UK and the US (Illinois, Indiana, Kentucky and Ohio).

== Description ==
External image
- Reconstruction of Arthropitys Scale bar = 1 m

Arthropitys bistriata grew as a tree, reaching a height of over 15 metres (49 ft). It has a central trunk from the upper portions of which grew sideways and upwards growing branches, it also had extensive underground rhizomes.

== Classification ==
Rößler, Feng & Noll (2012) classified Arthropitys within Calamitaceae.

== Gallery ==
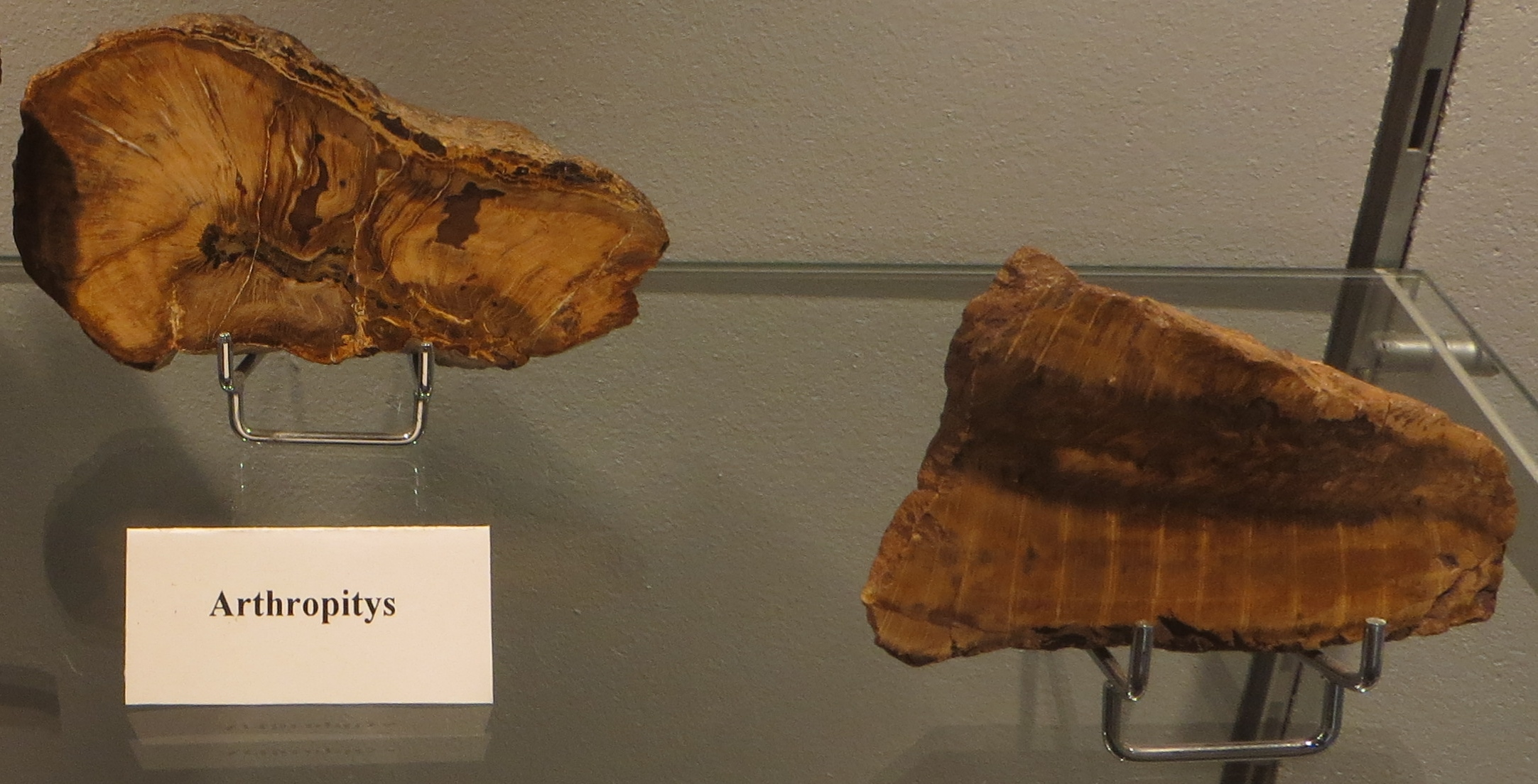
Two Arthropitys .sp fossils discovered in Italy

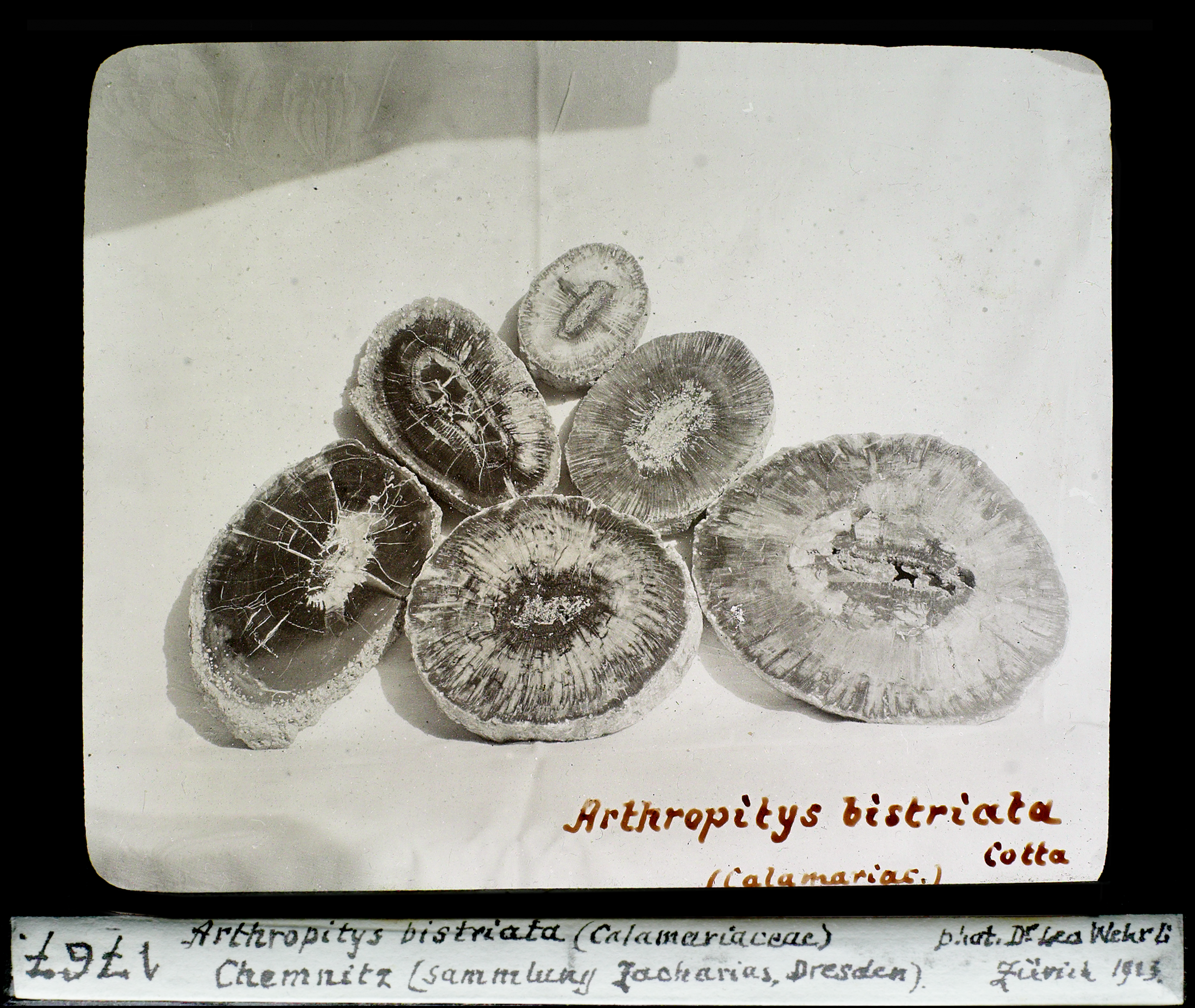
A. bistriata fossils from Chemnitz

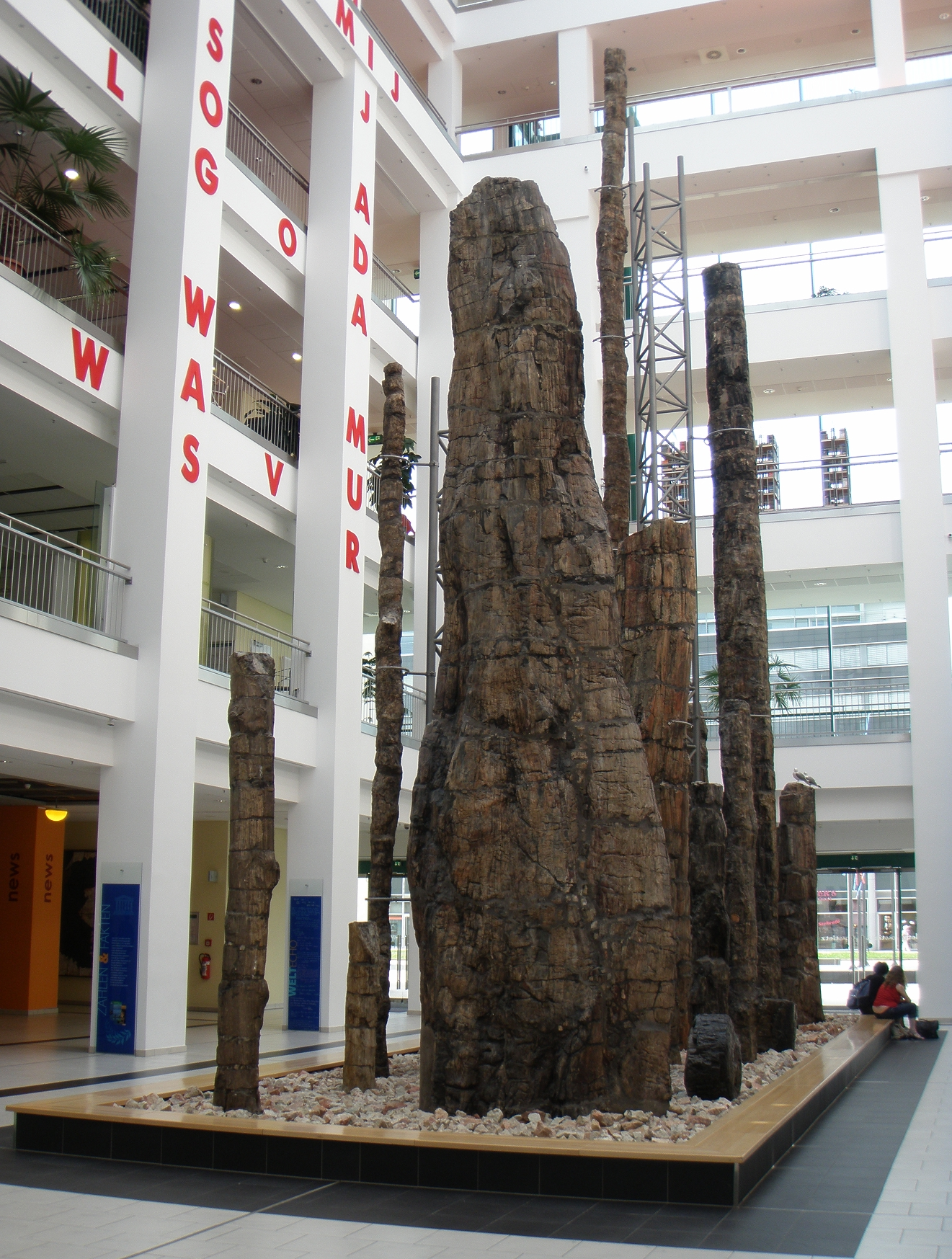
Fossils from the petrified forest of Chemnitz in which Arthrophitys .sp is common. Located in Chemnitz occurrence on display in the courtyard of DASTietz and Museum of Natural History Chemnitz
