= Chemnitz petrified forest =

Petrified forest in Germany

Coordinates: 50°49′51″N 12°55′22″E

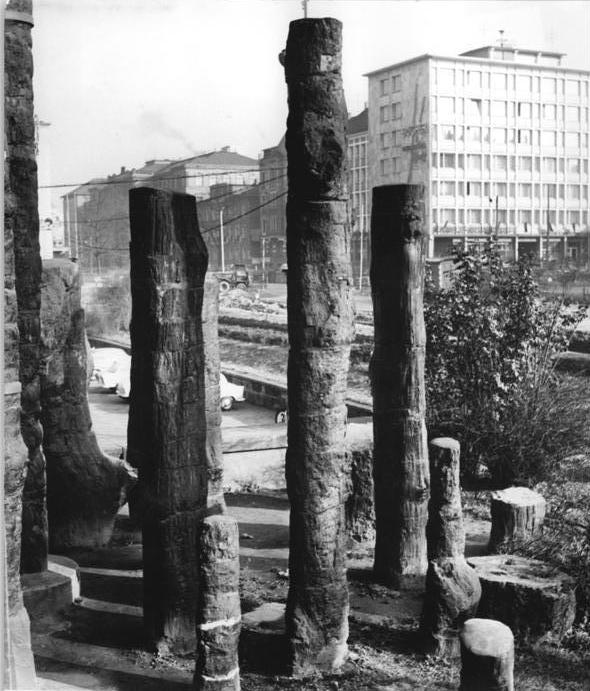
- Petrified forest as it appeared in 1964
- Interactive map of Chemnitz petrified forest

Geography
- Location: Chemnitz, Germany

The Chemnitz petrified forest is a petrified forest in Chemnitz, Germany, that is part of the Early Permian Leukersdorf Formation.

Most of the trunks are exhibited in the Museum of Natural History in Chemnitz inside of Kulturkaufhaus Tietz, including slices of trunks with polished edges. A small collection can be seen also on Zeißstraße (Hilbersdorf, 1911). From April 4, 2008, to Fall 2011, an excavation in Hilbersdorf was held to find and research more trunks. Their researchers discovered, amongst others, Arthropitys bistriata, a type of Calamites, giant horsetails that are ancestors of modern horsetails, found on this location with never seen multiple branches. Many more plants and animals from this excavation are still in an ongoing research. This exceptional find received the 2010 Fossil of the Year award of the German Paleontological Society. It was integrated into the permanent exhibition.

== History ==
Georgius Agricola (1494–1555) described petrified trees in the Chemnitz area first at 1546.

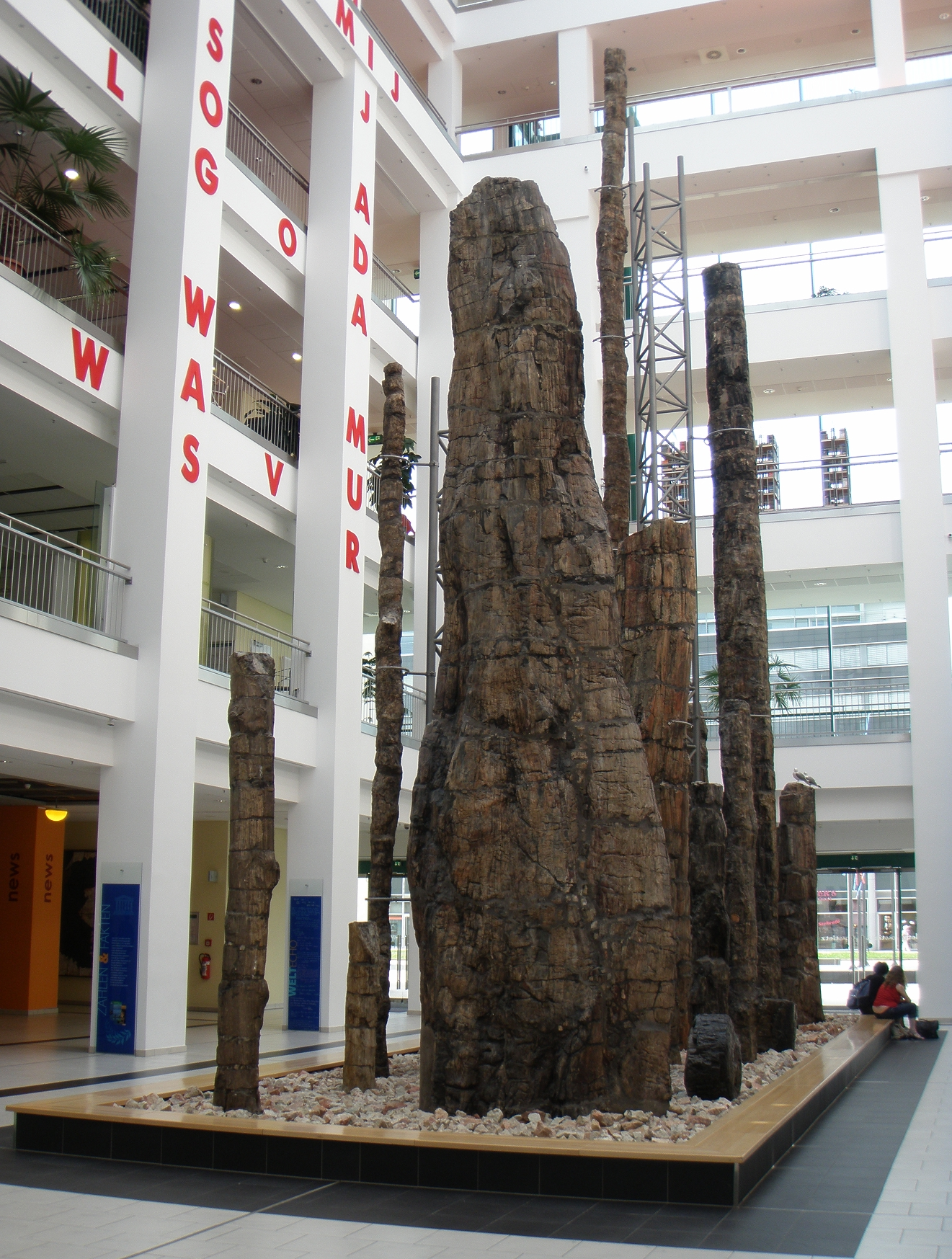
Petrified wood from the Chemnitz occurrence on display in the courtyard of DASTietz and Museum of Natural History Chemnitz

Petrified trunks of tree ferns, seed ferns, conifers as well as Cordaitales and different species of Calamites. The primeval plants were repeatedly discovered from the 17th century ongoing till today and mostly at Hilbersdorf, today a district of Chemnitz. In the mid-18th century, gemstone prospector David Frenzel (1691–1772) found numerous examples of this wood in the hills in and around Chemnitz. One of his 1751 finds is one of the few petrified wood specimens still possessing its roots (Megadeudron saxonicum). This petrified wood was transported to Dresden (Zwinger, for exhibition in the Roayal Saxon Museum). Later a collector, the Hilbersdorf contractor Güldner, bequeathed some of the petrified logs to King Albert Museum in Chemnitz. The first director of the Museum, Johann Traugott Sterzel (1841–1914), took over the investigation of the findings. The Sterzeleanum in the museum (the petrified forest display) is dedicated to him.

== Creation of the petrified forest ==
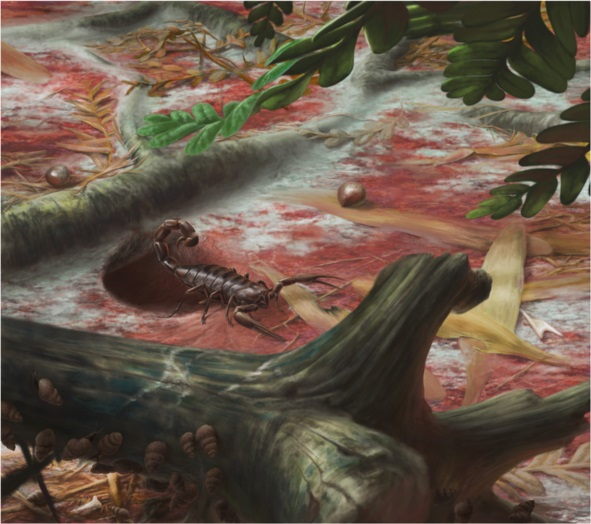
Reconstruction of Opsieobuthus tungeri, a scorpion found in Chemnitz petrified forest.

The petrified forest was formed in connection with the eruption of the Zeisigwald volcano in the lower Permian and dates back about 291 million years. The trees were uprooted or snapped off by the eruption and the amount of tephra, much like the trees caught in the 1980 eruption of Mount St. Helens. The trunks were then covered with hot tephra. In the following of years, the silicic acid included in the tephra ensured the fossilization of Permian plants, preserving them until today.

== Fauna ==
The varanopid Ascendonanus As well as reptiles, amphibians (like Aistopod), gastropods and arthropods, including the trigonotarbid Permotarbus and scorpion Opsieobuthus, diplopod such as Arthropleura are known from the forest.
