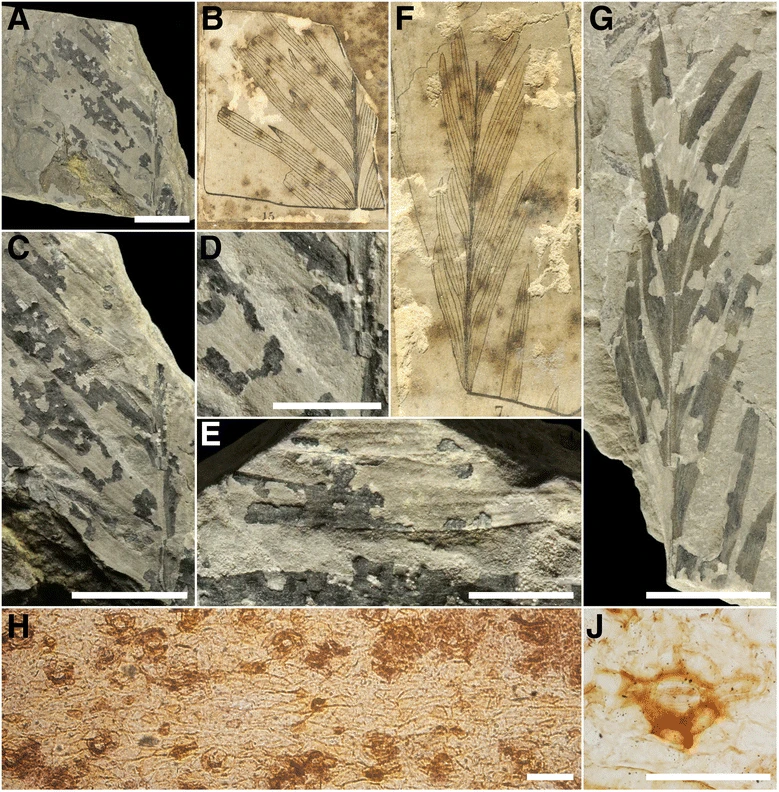

Scientific classification
- Kingdom: Plantae
- Clade: Tracheophytes
- Clade: Gymnospermae
- Division: Cycadophyta
- Class: Cycadopsida
- Order: Cycadales
- Family: Zamiaceae
- Genus: †Almargemia; Florin 1933

Species
- A. dentata (Type species)

= Almargemia =

Almargemia Temporal range: Early Cretaceous

Extinct genus of cycads

Almargemia is a genus of fossil leaves from the Early Cretaceous of Portugal produced by members of the Zamiaceae. It was erected by Rudolf Florin based on macrofossil material with preserved cuticle.

== Taxonomy ==
The material on which it is based was first described by Oswald Heer under the name Ctenidium dentatum and C. integerrimum. Later, the cuticle was described by Florin, who transferred the material to the newly erected genus Almargemia.

== Description ==
The leaflets of Almargemia have few parallel veins that do not fuse together. The leaflet margin have large, lobe-like teeth. The cuticle has elongated pavement cells, with some pavement cells having a dark-stained cuticles. The stomata are sunken in a stomatal pit.
