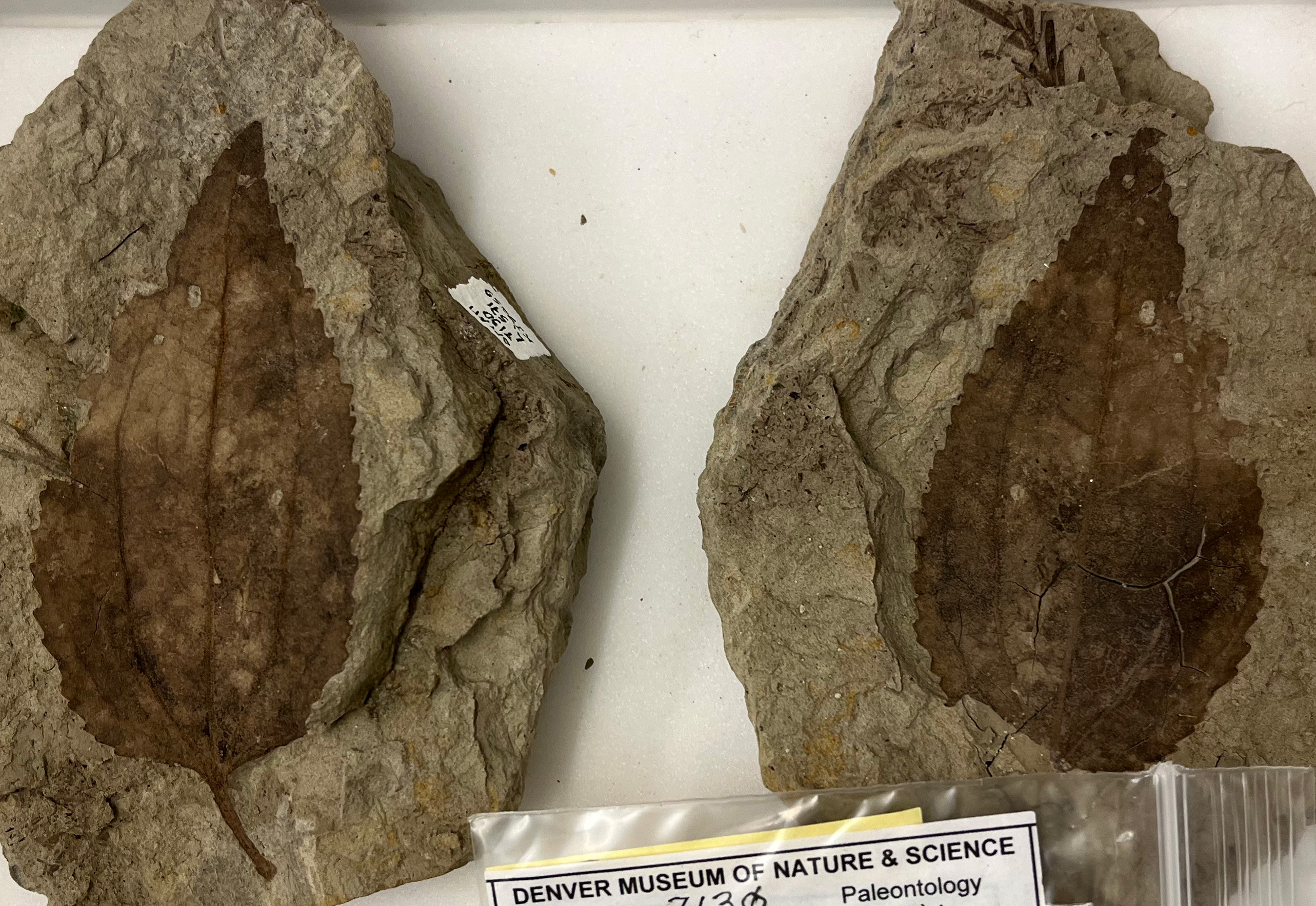

Scientific classification
- Kingdom: Plantae
- Clade: Tracheophytes
- Clade: Angiosperms
- Clade: Eudicots
- Order: Saxifragales
- Family: Cercidiphyllaceae
- Genus: †Trochodendroides; Berry 1922

Species
- †Trochodendroides arctica; †Trochodendroides genetrix; †Trochodendroides rhomboideus; †Trochodendroides ellipticum; †Trochodendroides nebrascensis; †Trochodendroides serrulata

= Trochodendroides =

Trochodendroides Temporal range: Early Cretaceous to Middle Eocene (Albian-Bartonian), 113.2–37.7 Ma

Genus of extinct plant

Trochodendroides is an extinct genus of flowering plants belonging to the Cercidiphyllaceae (sometimes called the katsura family). Fossils have been widely recovered from Cretaceous to Paleogene deposits across the Northern Hemisphere, especially in northeastern Russia and parts of North America. It was once thought to be a member of the family known as Trochodendraceae.

== Description ==
Leaves attributed to Trochodendroides are typically ovate to elliptical in shape, with entire to slightly serrated margins. The most distinctive feature of these leaves is their palmate, brochidodromous venation, in which several primary veins radiate from the base and are interconnected by looping secondary veins—a characteristic used to differentiate them from similar fossil genera. Fossil specimens range in size from small, shrub-like leaves to larger, tree-sized foliage. Although no definitive reproductive structures have been assigned to Trochodendroides, some fossil assemblages have revealed consistent co-occurrence with infructescences assigned to the genus Jenkinsella and pollen-bearing structures like Alasia, suggesting these may represent components of the same plant taxon.

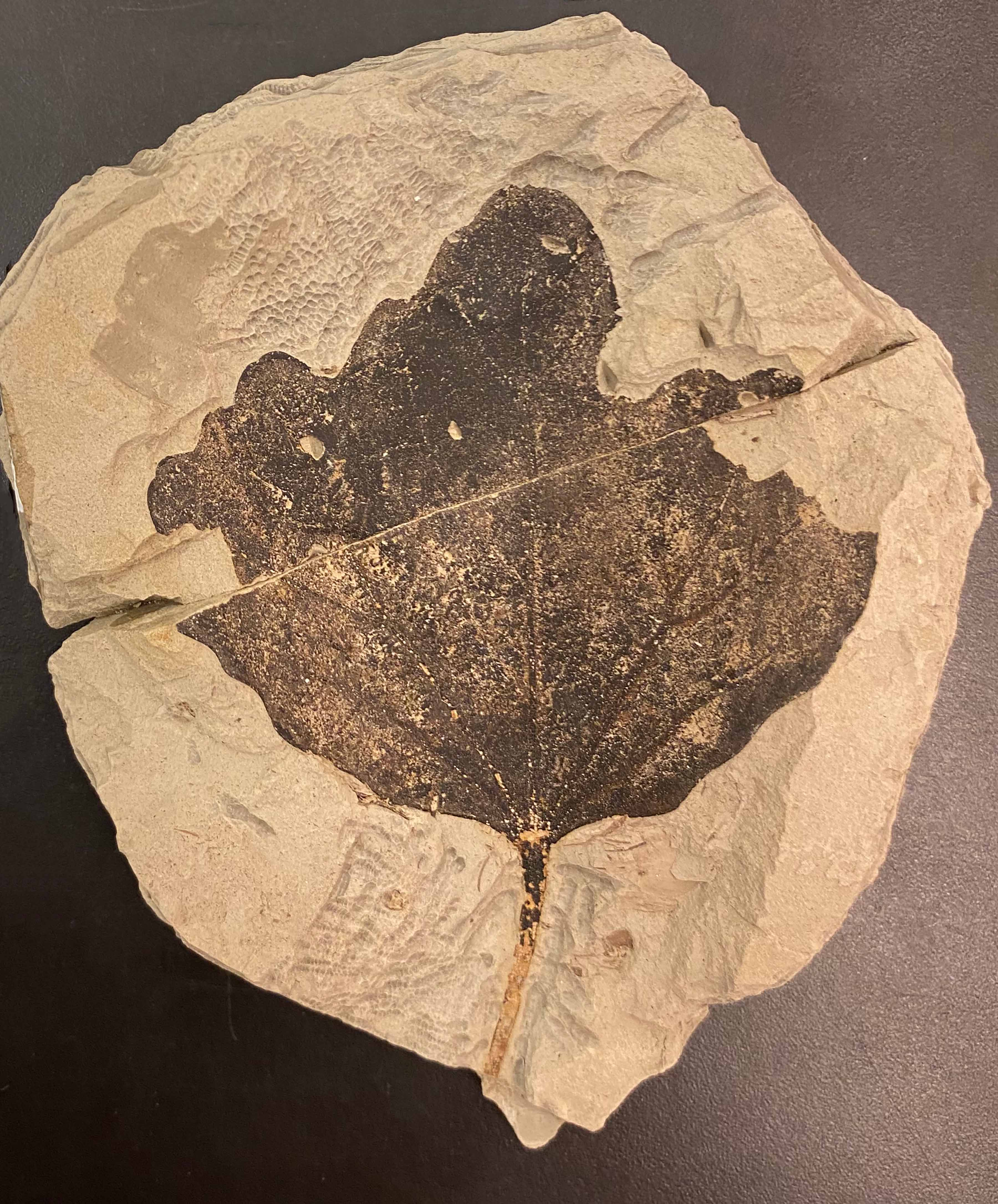
A fossil of Trochodendroides nebrascensis which was found in Hell Creek

== Distribution ==
Fossils of Trochodendroides are known from North America, Europe, and Asia. In Canada, they have been found in the provinces of Saskatchewan, Alberta, and British Columbia. In the USA, fossils have been discovered in North Dakota, South Dakota, Montana, and Wyoming. In the Old World, fossil remains have been identified in China, Mongolia, Russia, and the UK. The most recent known fossils come from Jilin in China.

== Paleoenvironment ==
Trochodendroides lived in a diverse array of habitats. The earliest known fossils of Trochodendroides have been recovered from the Early Cretaceous deposits of British Columbia and Alberta. These fossils indicate that the genus initially inhabited fluvial–lacustrine environments influenced by volcanic activity. Later Cretaceous records suggest a broader ecological tolerance. Fossils from Santonian of Alberta point to the occupation of coastal plain environments, while specimens from Cenomanian of Russia indicate survival in cooler climates, with estimated winter temperatures of around 5.5 °C. In the Maastrichtian of the Western US, fossils from the Hell Creek Formation show that Trochodendroides grew in what were wetland habitats. Similar environmental preferences are inferred from the Nemegt Formation (such as in the Altan Uul member) of Mongolia, which represented a seasonally wet environment comparable to the modern Okavango Delta in Africa, although the formation also experienced occasional dry periods with intervals of semi-arid conditions. Fossils from the Paleogene of China indicate that those specimens lived in a temperate environment. Modern katsura trees inhabit mountainous regions of Japan and China, where they grow in cool, dense forests with high humidity.

Trochodendroides fossils are usually found alongside conifers such as Metasequoia but also other angiosperms such as Platanus.
