= Succinanthera =

Succinanthera Temporal range: 40–55 Ma Eocene

Scientific classification
- Kingdom: Plantae
- Clade: Tracheophytes
- Clade: Angiosperms
- Clade: Monocots
- Order: Asparagales
- Family: Orchidaceae
- Subfamily: Epidendroideae
- Genus: †Succinanthera; Poinar & Rasmussen
- Species: †S. baltica

Binomial name
- †Succinanthera baltica Poinar & Rasmussen

Extinct genus of orchids

Succinanthera baltica is an extinct, middle Eocene orchid known only from an anther cap with pollinarium (Note: Researchers describe "pollinia and caudicular viscin threads" but this particular type of viscin is later referred to as "elastoviscin" in the paper) attached to the base of the leg of a female fungus gnat, Bradysia, trapped in Baltic amber. It is the only species in the genus Succinanthera. The fossil was found in the Samland Peninsula and its age was determined by geochemical tests on the sediments surrounding the amber. The species is considered to be from 40 to 55 million years old.

The fossil is tentatively assigned to the subfamily Epidendroideae but does not appear to contain enough information to determine the tribe it belongs to.
