= Güvem Formation =

Geologic formation in Turkey

The Güvem Formation is a geologic formation in Turkey. It contains plant fossils dating back to the Early Miocene, and is especially notable for preserving evidence of insect damage to plants. The formation is roughly 1,100 metres (3,600 ft) thick and is made up of pyroclasts, rhyolite, andesite and various dacites. Pollen grains from this formation have been researched and indicate the presence of mixed-mesophytic forest in the range 17.9 to 17.8 million years ago.
