= Pinus ravii =

Scientific classification
- Kingdom: Plantae
- Clade: Tracheophytes
- Clade: Gymnospermae
- Division: Pinophyta
- Class: Pinopsida
- Order: Pinales
- Family: Pinaceae
- Genus: Pinus
- Subgenus: P. subg. Strobus
- Section: P. sect. Quinquefoliae
- Subsection: P. subsect. Strobus
- Species: P. ravii

Binomial name
- Pinus ravii R.C.Srivastava, 2013

Synonyms
- Pinus wallichiana var. parva K.C.Sahni

Species of conifer

Pinus ravii is a rare, disputed species of large-sized conifer in the family Pinaceae, closely similar to Pinus wallichiana and possibly synonymous with it.

It is native to the Arunachal Pradesh of northern India, where it grows in a temperate climate within the Himalayan Mountain Range. Pinus ravii is also reported to have a greyish-white bark with an abnormal structure compared to Pinus wallichiana (which it was originally listed as a synonym of).
