= Leukersdorf Formation =

Geologic formation in Germany

- Stratigraphic range: Early Permian, ~291–290 Ma
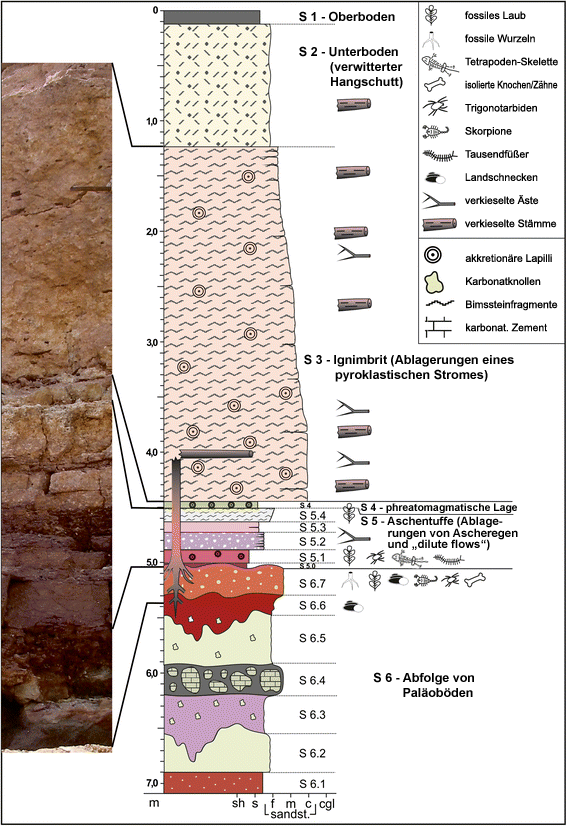
- Stratigraphy of the Leukersdorf Formation
- Type: Geological formation

Location
- Country: Germany
- Extent: Chemnitz Basin

The Leukersdorf Formation is a geologic formation in Germany. It preserves fossils dating back to the lower Permian period. The Chemnitz petrified forest occurs within this formation, and fossils have been found in the Leukersdorf Formation since at least 1546.

== See also ==
- List of fossiliferous stratigraphic units in Germany
