= Celastrinites =

Celastrinites Temporal range: 89.3–70.6 Ma

Scientific classification
- Kingdom: Plantae
- Clade: Tracheophytes
- Clade: Angiosperms
- Clade: Eudicots
- Clade: Rosids
- Order: Celastrales
- Family: Celastraceae
- Genus: †Celastrinites; Saporta

Species
- Celastrinites alatus Knowlton; Celastrinites artocarpidioides Lesquereux; Celastrinites cowanensis Knowlton; Celastrinites elegans Lesquereux; Celastrinites kolymensis Knowlton; Celastrinites laevigatus Lesquereux; Celastrinites wardii

Extinct genus of flowering plants

Celastrinites is an extinct genus of prehistoric plants in the family Celastraceae. Celastrinites wardii is from the Cretaceous of British Columbia, Canada. C. elegans is from the Florissant fossil bed of Colorado.
