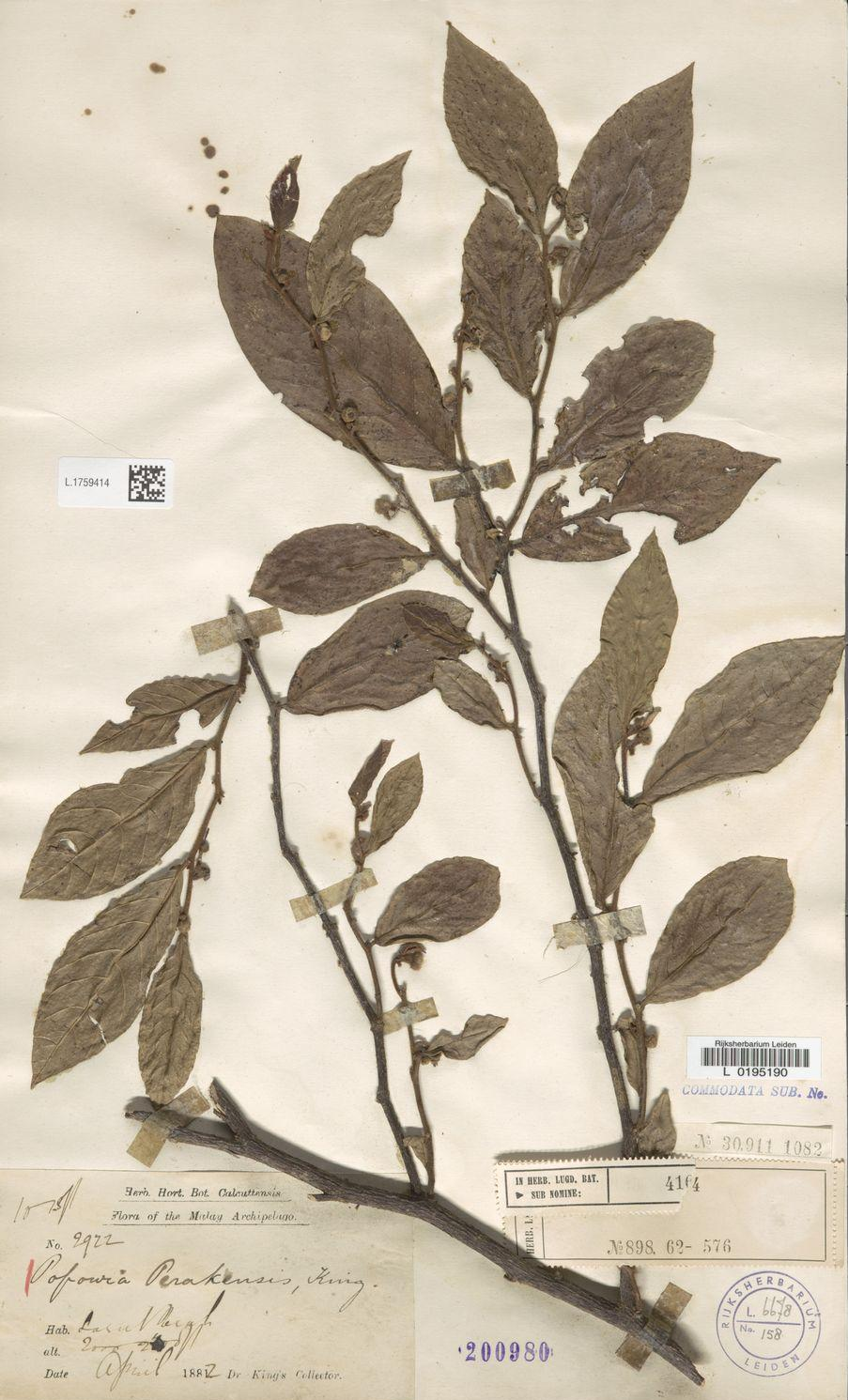
- Popowia fusca, herbarium specimen

Scientific classification
- Kingdom: Plantae
- Clade: Embryophytes
- Clade: Tracheophytes
- Clade: Spermatophytes
- Clade: Angiosperms
- Clade: Magnoliids
- Order: Magnoliales
- Family: Annonaceae
- Tribe: Miliuseae
- Genus: Popowia; Endl.

= Popowia =

Genus of flowering plants

Popowia is a genus of flowering plants in the family Annonaceae. It includes 25 species which range from India through Indochina and Malesia to southeastern China and New Guinea.

These are shrubs and trees. The inflorescence is a solitary flower or a cluster of several. The small, bisexual flowers have six thick petals in two whorls; the petals are sometimes joined to form a cup shape.

== Species ==
25 species are accepted.

- Popowia alata S.K.Ganesan
- Popowia bachmaensis Ngoc, Tagane & Yahara
- Popowia bancana Scheff.
- Popowia beccarii Scheff.
- Popowia beddomeana Hook.f. & Thomson
- Popowia clavata Diels
- Popowia cuspidata Miq.
- Popowia cyanocarpa K.Schum. & Lauterb.
- Popowia filipes Hemsl.
- Popowia fusca King
- Popowia helferi Hook.f. & Thomson
- Popowia hirta Miq.
- Popowia lanceolata Merr.
- Popowia microphylla R.E.Fr.
- Popowia odoardi Diels
- Popowia pachypetala Diels
- Popowia papuana Scheff.
- Popowia pauciflora Maingay ex Hook.f. & Thomson
- Popowia perakensis King
- Popowia pisocarpa (Blume) Endl. ex Walp.
- Popowia platyphylla Diels
- Popowia polytricha Diels
- Popowia schefferiana Diels
- Popowia tomentosa Maingay ex Hook.f. & Thomson
- Popowia velutina King
