= Ginkgolide =

Biologically active terpenic lactone

Chemical structure of gingkolide B

Ginkgolides are biologically active terpenic lactones present in Ginkgo biloba. They are diterpenoids with 20-carbon skeletons, which are biosynthesized from geranylgeranyl pyrophosphate.

== Examples ==
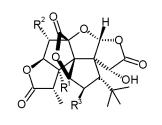
Chemical structure of ginkgolides

Ginkgolides
Name	R^{1}	R^{2}	R^{3}
Ginkgolide A	OH	H	H
Ginkgolide B	OH	OH	H
Ginkgolide C	OH	OH	OH
Ginkgolide J	OH	H	OH
Ginkgolide M	H	OH	OH

=== Ginkgolide A ===
Ginkgolide A has a chemical formula of C_{20}H_{24}O_{9}, its CAS No. is 15291-75-5.

Aside from the G. Biloba tree, this ginkgolide has also been reported to be present in Machilus wangchiana. It is also biologically active.

A study has concluded that Ginkgolide A can induce the CYP1A2 enzyme, but not as much as other chemicals present in Ginkgo. This means that Ginkgolide A can increase the action of CYP1A2. Ginkgolide A also acts as an antagonist of glycine receptors and α_{1}β_{2}γ_{2L} GABA_{A} receptors. Additionally, it acts as a powerful PAF antagonist.

=== Ginkgolide B ===
Ginkgolide B, specifically, is a diterpenoid trilactone with six five-membered rings. It contains a spiro[4,4]-nonane carbocyclic ring, a tetrahydrofuran ring, and a very specific tert-butyl group at one of the rings (Figure 1). The class of ginkgolides was first isolated from the tree Ginkgo biloba in 1932. Structural elucidation was accomplished in 1967 by Maruyama et al.

=== Ginkgolide C ===
Ginkgolide C is a ginkgolide with the chemical formula of C_{20}H_{24}O_{11} and the CAS number 15291-76-6. It is an inhibitor of PAFR with an IC50 value of 7.5μM. This ginkgolide also appears to possess anti-inflammatory properties and activity against oxidative stress. A total synthesis of Ginkgolide C has also been reported.

== Background ==
It is extracted from the root bark and leaves of the Ginkgo biloba (ginkyo meaning "silver apricot") tree found native in China. It is marketed to other countries that include Korea, France, the United States, etc. for the drug and clinical properties of the extracts. Present in the tree is less than 0.1 to 0.25% of ginkgolide B, the most abundant being ginkgolide A.

== Potential applications ==
This class of molecules has been studied for its potential to act as a platelet-activating factor receptor antagonist.

Ginkgolide B has been investigated for its potential to reducing migraine frequency.

Ginkgolide B is also used in treatment for cerebrovascular disease. Research has also proven that ginkgolide B can also treat migraines in young ages. The literature indicates that ginkgolide B functions as a selective antagonist of glycine receptors based on noncompetitive inhibition for the neurological system that this compound performs.

== Spectroscopic studies for the elucidation of the individual structures for the ginkgolides ==
Ginkolides A - C were isolated from a large scale methanolic extraction followed by liquid-liquid partitions, column chromatography and repeated crystallizations. The molecular formulas were determined by high resolution mass spectrometry, and the overall structures by IR and NMR spectroscopic analysis and extensive derivitization techniques.

== Biosynthesis of ginkgolide B ==
The biosynthesis of ginkgolide B

While researchers have published chemical pathways to make this molecule, most of the designed syntheses were too complex and produced little of the actual material to run full analyses. Therefore, studying the biosynthesis of the molecule is preferable.

Most of the natural product terpenoids start with isopentenyl diphosphate synthesized by the MEP pathway. This pathway also generates dimethylallyl diphosphate, from pyruvate and D-glyercaldehyde 3-phosphate (GAP). When coupled together, they form one molecule of geranylgeranyl diphosphate with geranylgeranyl diphosphate synthase.

A molecule of GGPP generates (1) (+)-copalyl in the presence of levopimaradiene synthase. (a) Then (1) loses its OPP group catalyzed by this same synthase, performing an intramolecular allylic cyclization with the two alkenes, to form (2) the sandaracopimarenyl cation. (b) This cation then undergoes an internal cyclization to stabilize the carbocation in the ring by proton transfer to form (3) intermediate. (c) By doing this, the molecule sets itself up for a methyl migration to stabilize that secondary cation and generate that tertiary carbocation at (4). (d) This induces a loss of proton to get (5) levopimaradiene. (e) With oxidation, a loss of a proton to form an aromatic ring generates (6) abietatriene. (g) This newly formed abietatriene undergoes a 1,2-alkyl shift to break the 6-membered ring into (7) with a five-membered ring (more favorable). (h) Another 1,2-alkyl shift takes place at the same time a ring cleavage takes place to generate (8). (i) Oxidation at all the positions with alkenes generates (9) intermediate which then undergoes ring closures featuring one hemiacetal and all three lactones to get ginkgolide B at (10).

== See also ==
- Bilobalide
