= (+)-copalyl-diphosphate diphosphate-lyase =

(+)-copalyl-diphosphate diphosphate-lyase may refer to:

- Levopimaradiene synthase, an enzyme
- Phyllocladan-16alpha-ol synthase, an enzyme
