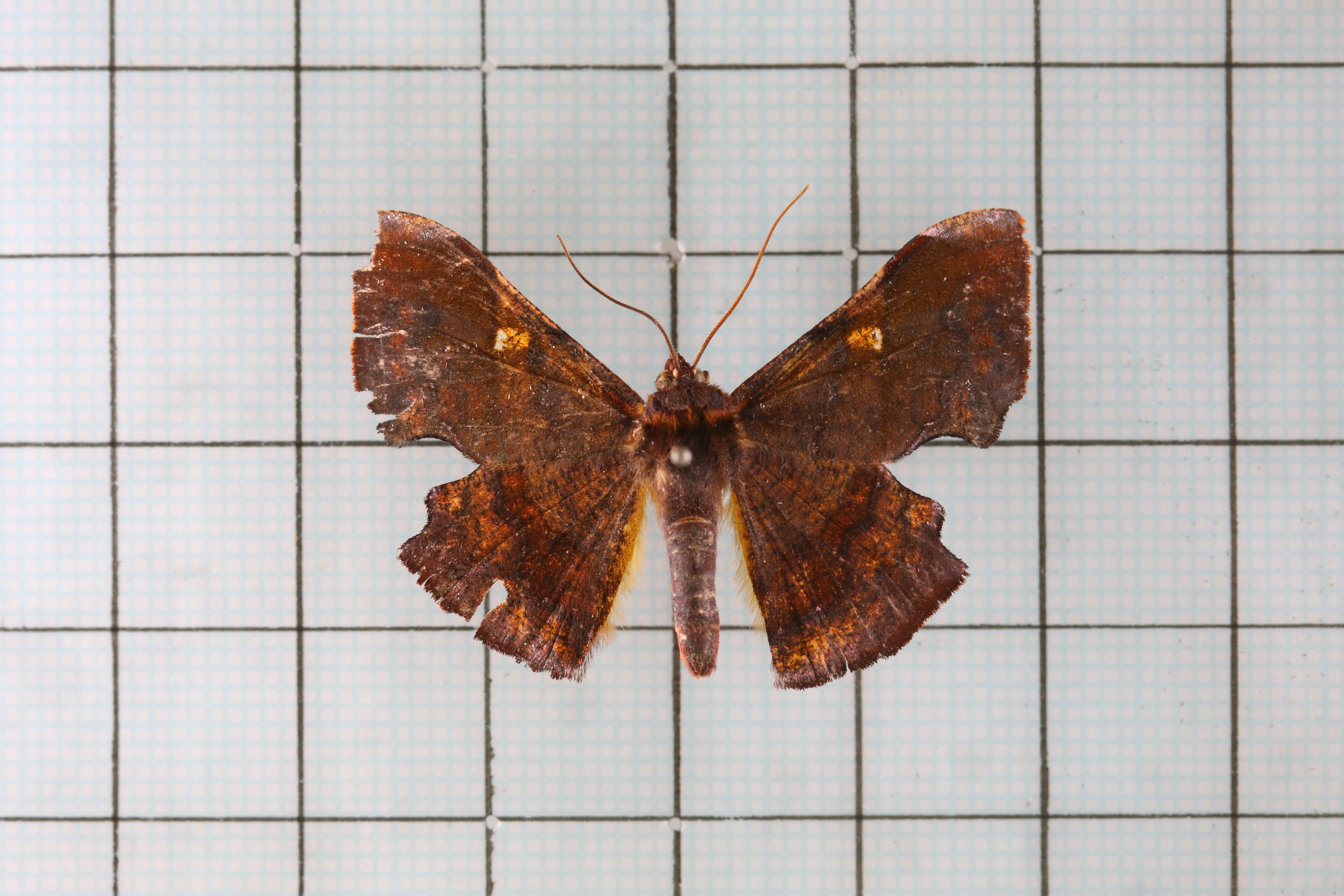

Scientific classification
- Kingdom: Animalia
- Phylum: Arthropoda
- Class: Insecta
- Order: Lepidoptera
- Family: Geometridae
- Genus: Fascellina
- Species: F. chromataria

Binomial name
- Fascellina chromataria Walker, 1860

Synonyms
- Fascellina ceylonica Moore, 1887; Fascellina nigrochromaria Inoue, 1955; Fascellina subchromaria Wehrli, 1936; Geometra usta Walker, 1866

= Fascellina chromataria =

Species of moth

Fascellina chromataria is a moth in the family Geometridae described by Francis Walker in 1860. It is found in Korea, Japan, Taiwan, China, India, Bhutan and Sri Lanka.

== Description ==
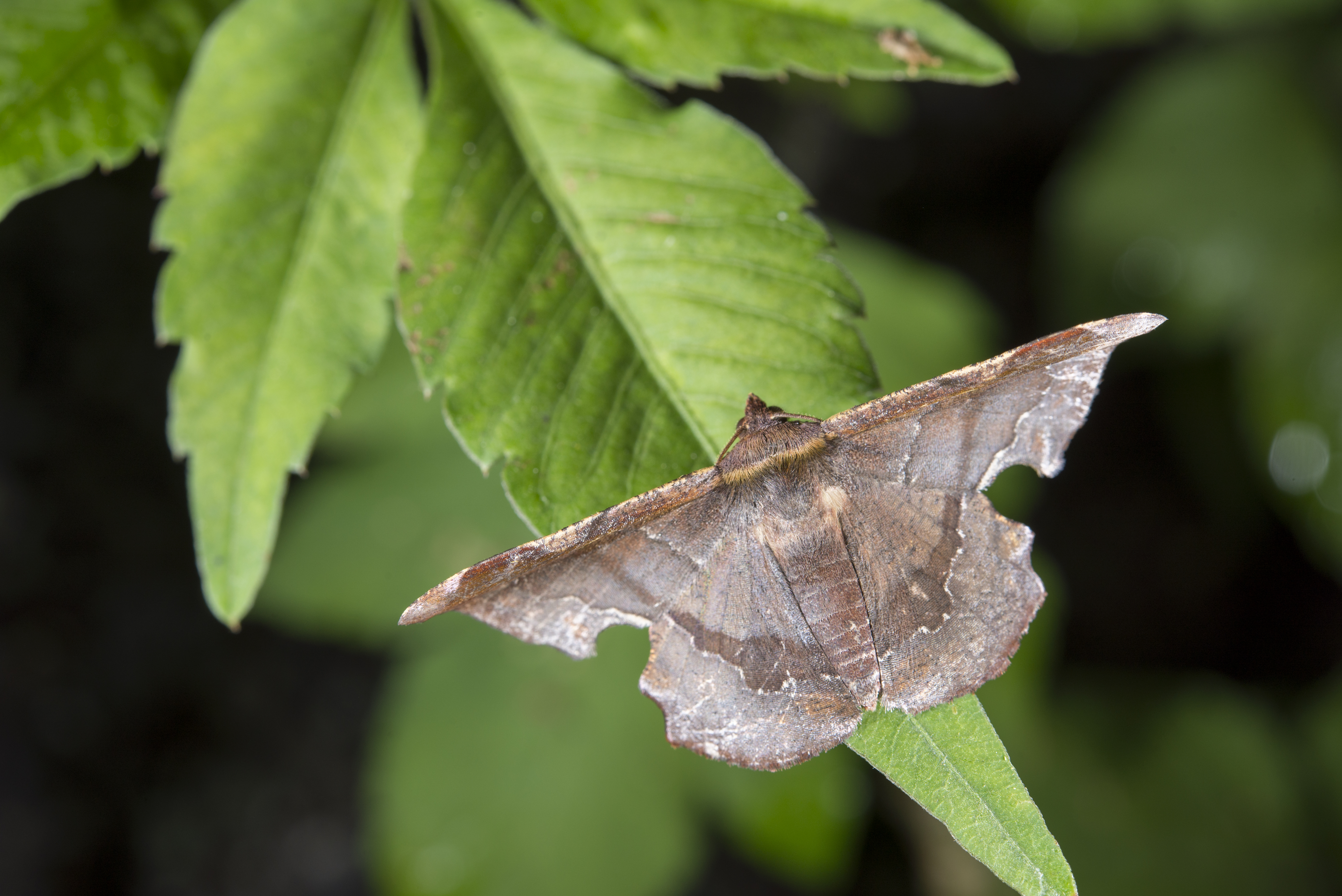

The wingspan of the male is 38 mm. Forewings with outer and inner margins excised towards outer angle. Hindwings with the costa and apex more or less truncate and excised. Cilia non-crenulate. Male has deep reddish-brown body with an olive shade and slightly suffused with purplish grey. Wings with dark striae. Forewings with grey costa. There is an oblique antemedial line angled below the costa and a yellow spot at end of the cell often with a hyaline center. Traces of a postmedial line can be seen. A curved and waved purplish-grey submarginal line present angled below costa, and on the hindwings becoming postmedial. Ventral side of forewings with yellow basal half, brown outer area, bright reddish brown inside the postmedial line. This postmedial line is prominent, angled and purple, or with a quadrate sinus below costa and often waved towards inner margin. Hindwings yellow, suffused and striated with rufous outer area. There is an indistinct postmedial and curved crenulate submarginal line present. Wingspan of the female is 44 mm. Female much similar to male, but differs in much red in color.

Larva purplish black with irregular purple-red markings in the thoracic segments. Head cleft and produced to two papillae. The larvae have been recorded feeding on Lindera, Cinnamomum, Machilus and Illicium species.

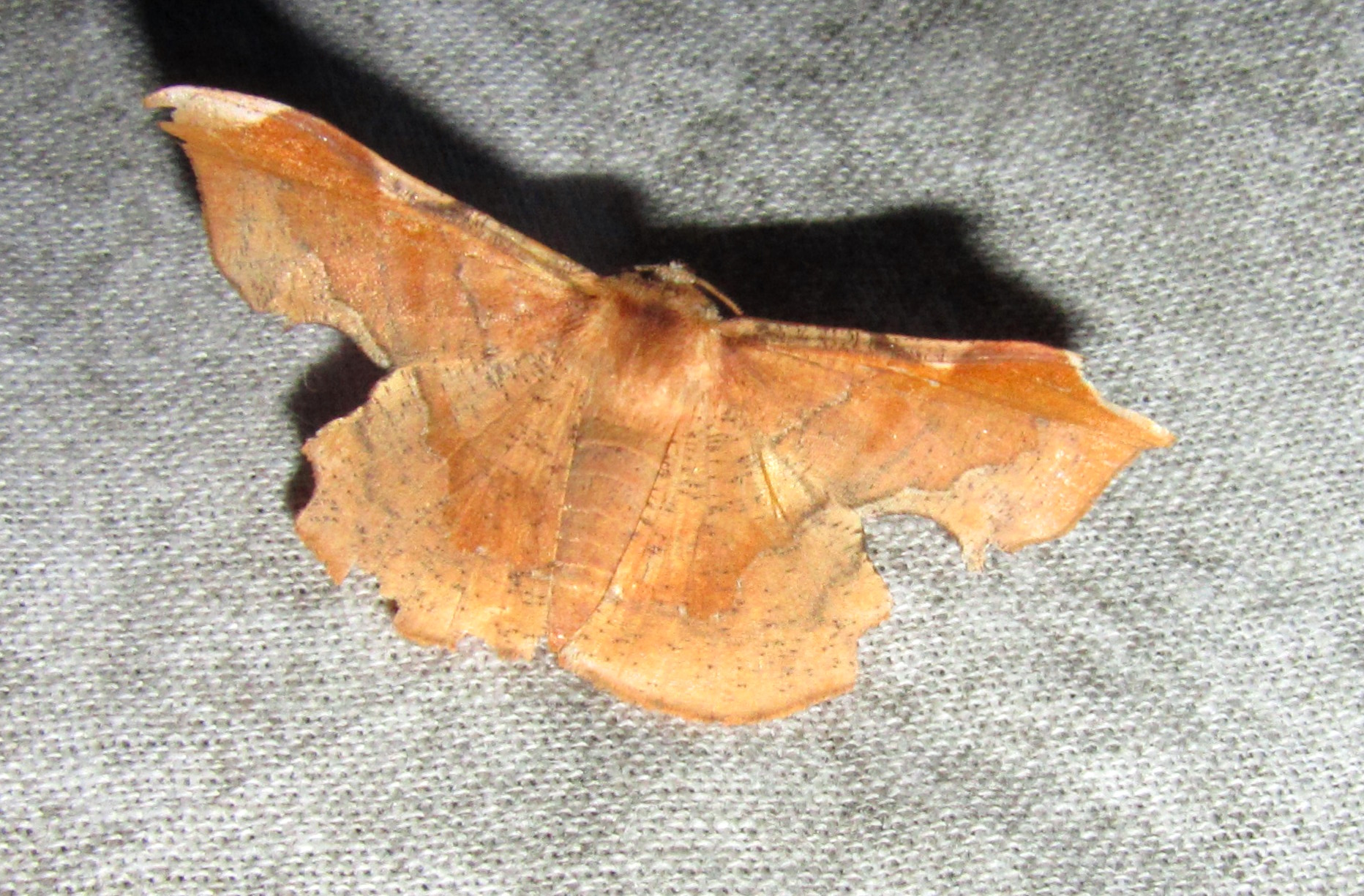
