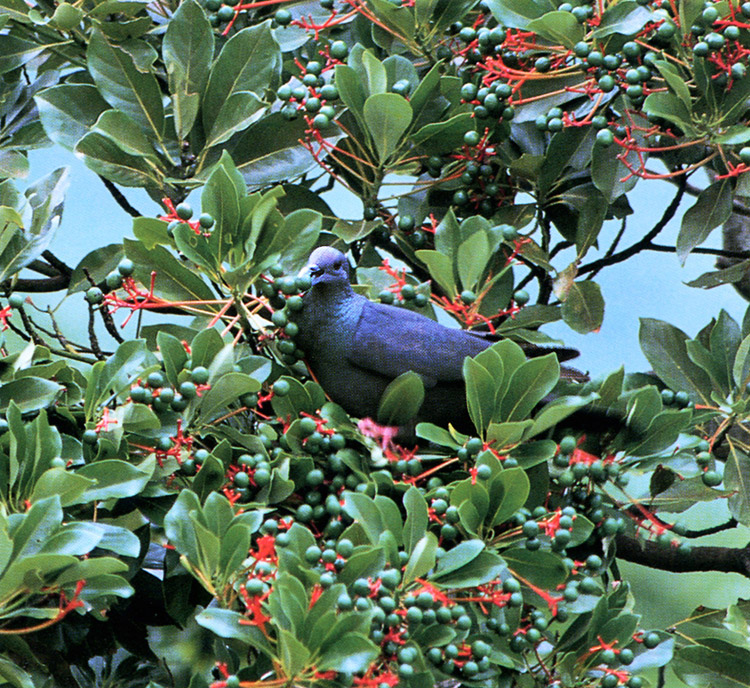
- Black wood pigeon in Machilus thunbergii (Ulleung Sadong Black Pigeon Habitat)

Conservation status
- Least Concern (IUCN 3.1)

Scientific classification
- Kingdom: Animalia
- Phylum: Chordata
- Class: Aves
- Order: Columbiformes
- Family: Columbidae
- Genus: Columba
- Species: C. janthina

Binomial name
- Columba janthina Temminck, 1830

= Black wood pigeon =

Species of bird

The black wood pigeon or Japanese wood pigeon (Columba janthina) is a species of bird in the family Columbidae. It is found in East Asia, occurring mainly on offshore islands of the Pacific's Korea Strait, Philippine Sea and East China Sea around Japan, Korea, China, and Taiwan. Its natural habitats are temperate forests and subtropical or tropical moist lowland forests. The species is in decline owing to habitat loss, habitat degradation, deforestation and hunting. This wood pigeon is endemic to laurel forest habitat.

== Description ==
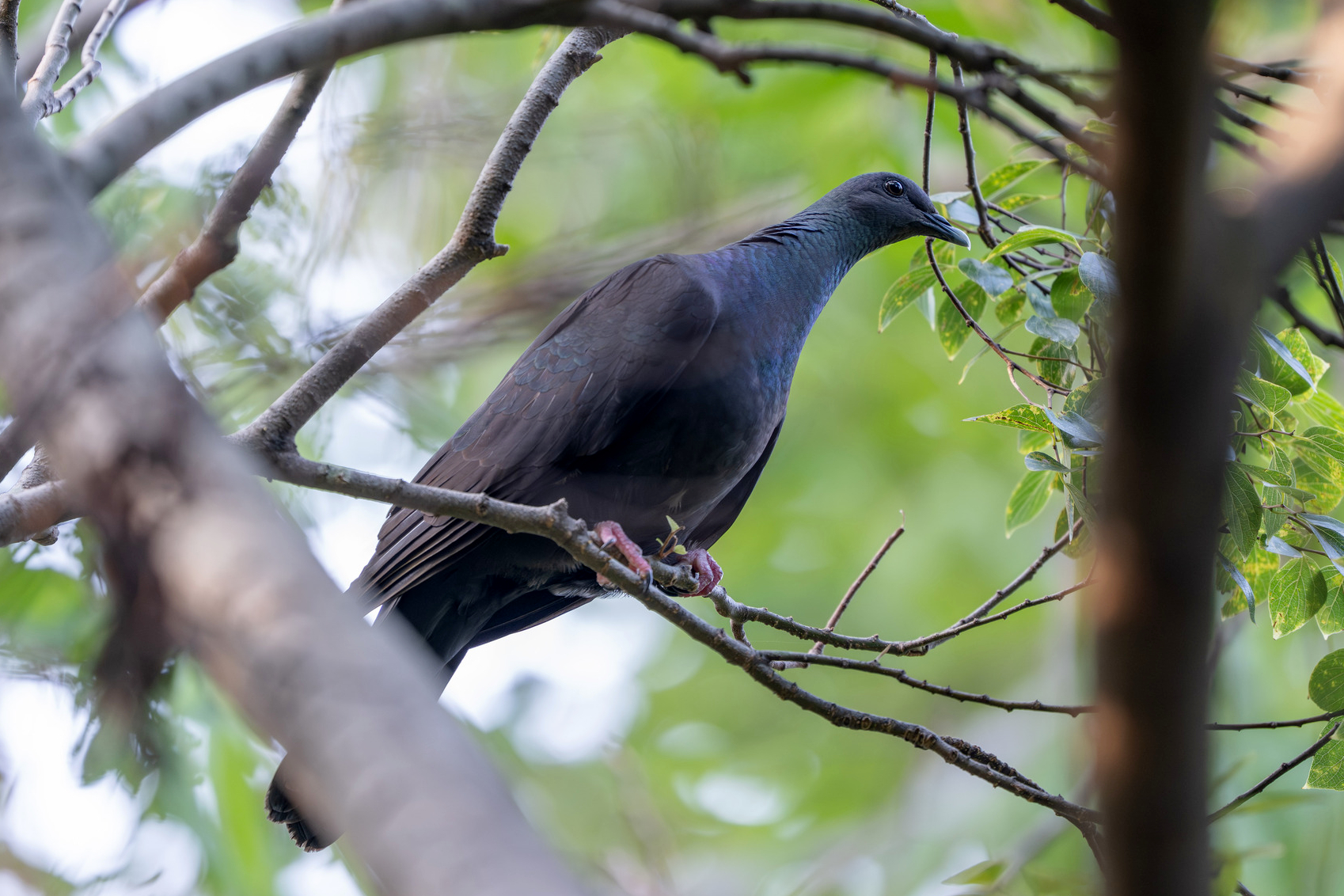
Black wood pigeon in Zhejiang, China

The black wood pigeon is the largest East Asian representative of the genus Columba; with a weight of around 550 g (19 oz) and an overall length of 37–43.5 cm (14.6–17.1 in), it is on average only slightly smaller than the 41–45 cm (16–18 in) common wood pigeon of Europe and western Asia. The head is small. There are three subspecies of Columba janthina, with some plumage differences.

It is very dark in appearance, with a small head, a longish neck and tail. Overall the body is soot-black with iridescent green or purple on crown, shoulders and sides of neck. The irises are brown and the legs are red. The whole body is covered with iridescent black feathers. Its inconspicuous plumage is mainly black with the crown and rump bright metallic purple. The back and chest have green purple metallic sheen. The bill is longish, narrow and dark; it is greenish blue, with an ivory to pale yellow tip. The cere (fleshy covering at the base of the beak) is small.

It has no sexual dimorphism, with the sexes similar in appearance, but the juvenile has generally paler plumage, with limited or no development of the iridescence. The tarsi, red in adults, are paler in juveniles. In flight, it has large wings and slightly fanned tail.

=== Subspecies ===
Three subspecies are accepted:

- Columba janthina janthina Temminck, 1830. The head is covered with black feathers, and a dark blue beak. Islands off mainland Japan, Korea, China, Taiwan.
- Columba janthina nitens (Stejneger, 1887). The head is covered with purple-red feathers. The beak is black. It has a reddish or purplish face, head and upper back of neck. Ogasawara (Bonin Islands) and Iwo (Volcano Islands), east of Japan.
- Columba janthina stejnegeri (Kuroda, 1923). Yaeyama Islands (southern Ryukyu Islands), south of Japan.

== Distribution ==
The black wood pigeon lives in small islands of the East China Sea, mainly in the Ryukyu Islands, Iwo Jima and Bonin Islands and also along the southern coasts of Korea and Japan. While more abundant and with a greater range in the past, it is still thought to be resident on 15 islands and islets. It has recently colonised Zhejiang on the east coast of mainland China, with multiple records on iNaturalist and eBird.

It occurs locally on small islands off the south coast of South Korea, where it is found on, and breeds in Ulleungdo Island, Jeju-do and some areas off the south coast. It has been recorded as vagrant in eastern Russia, Shandong, and Taiwan.

It is an uncommon and local resident in Japan, on small islands off southern Honshu, Shikoku and Kyushu, south through the Nansei-Shoto islands in the Ryukyu Islands to the Yaeyama Islands and the Izu Islands to the Ogasawara and Iwo Islands. Distributed in Honshu region of Japan. Although it is still relatively common on the Izu Islands, it has apparently declined there since the 1950s, it was thought to have declined on Okinawa during the 1980s because of forestry activities. The subspecies Columba janthina nitens, which occurs on the Ogasawara and Iwo Islands, is very rare.

=== South Korea ===
In South Korea, this pigeon is a natural monument (215, designated 22 November 1968) South Korea also protects breeding sites (designated as Natural Monuments): Ulleung Sadong Black Pigeon Habitat (울릉 사동 흑비둘기 서식지) (natural monument 237, designated 14 December 1971), and Jeju Sasudo Seabirds (Black Pigeon, Shearwater) Breeding Ground (제주 사수도 바닷새류(흑비둘기, 슴새) 번식지) (Natural monument 333, November 20, 1982), and a provincial breeding site on Beomseom Island, where it is part of the Munseom and Beomseom Nature Reserve. Potential visitors require permission from the Cultural Heritage Administration to visit Sasudo.

== Ecology ==
It is a pigeon which is endemic to some islands of the Sea of Japan, Yellow Sea, and East China Sea. It is mainly an isolated island wood pigeon, a robust and confident forest bird with the same characteristics of other genus Columba pigeons adapted to habitat and vegetation of island laurel forest. Like some island races of common wood pigeon and some species of the Macaronesian or Pacific islands, wood pigeons have a low rate of reproduction.

Most of the diet is vegetable, but Columba janthina is considered omnivorous. It eats some worms and small snails, but has a strong preference plants, leaves, flowers, drupes, berries, fruit, acorns, pine and other conifer seeds, Kurogane mochi (Ilex rotunda), mochi-no-ki (Ilex integra), Sazanqua (Camellia sasanqua), Tsubaki (Camellia japonica), mulberry, fig, Machilus thunbergii, Nandina domestica, and others. This bird eats varied seeds, buds and fruit, which it collects directly from the trees. It has a preference for trees near ponds and rivers.

A resident breeder in laurisilva forests, the wood pigeon lays one white egg in a flimsy twig nest. The nest is located in a tree cavity or in the rocks. It lays eggs in September.

The black wood pigeon lives in dense subtropical forests. It also lives in beaches and islands in the evergreen broadleaf forest. It inhabits dense subtropical forest and warm temperate evergreen broadleaf forests, and is heavily dependent on mature forests, eating the berries of the trees and ultimately dispersing their seeds. It also eats leaves and (flower?) buds, especially nitrogen rich foliage during breeding. The diet changes seasonally as the availability of fruit changes, and leaves can comprise the major part of the diet at certain times of the year, particularly when there is little fruit around. One of their favourite leaves to eat is from genus Prunus, young shoots from Asteraceae, Caryophyllaceae, and cruciferous, rounded and fleshy leaves of ilex. They play an important ecological role, as they are the only birds capable of eating the largest native fruits and drupes from some native trees. Its numbers fell sharply after human colonisation of the archipelagos, and it vanished altogether from some Islands. The major cause of its population decline was habitat loss from forest clearance, but hunting and nest predation by introduced species and rats were also contributory factors. Protection of the laurel forests and a ban on hunting could enable numbers to increase, although this species is still endangered.

Columba janthina is a wood pigeon that often uses Camellia japonica for nesting and feeding but also used the Machilus thunbergii forests of Korea. For that reason, the distribution of the Machilus thunbergii and the Japanese wood pigeon are closely related and the preservation of Machilus thunbergii is directly connected with protection of Japanese wood pigeon. Environment of Japanese wood pigeon is in silver magnolia of seaside to eat fruits of a silver magnolia between the late July and the late August.
