= Daphnephila ornithocephala =

Scientific classification
- Kingdom: Animalia
- Phylum: Arthropoda
- Class: Insecta
- Order: Diptera
- Family: Cecidomyiidae
- Genus: Daphnephila
- Species: D. ornithocephala

Binomial name
- Daphnephila ornithocephala Tokuda, Yang & Yukawa, 2008

Species of fly

Daphnephila ornithocephala is a species of gall midge first associated with leaf galls on Lauraceae species, particularly Machilus thunbergii in Taiwan. Based on analysis on sequences of the mitochondrial cytochrome c oxidase subunit I, it has been suggested that in this genus, the stem-galling habit is a more ancestral state as opposed to the leaf-galling habit. This genus appears to have originated tropically and dispersed to Japan through Taiwan.
