= Bong tree =

Bong tree may refer to:

- Machilus kurzii, a tree in the laurel family
- Edward Lear, who mentioned the bong tree in "The Owl and the Pussycat"
  - "The Owl and the Pussycat", a poem by Lear, where the famous phrase where the Bong-tree grows originates
- The Tale of Little Pig Robinson by Beatrix Potter, written as a prequel to Edward Lear's "The Owl and the Pussycat" and features the land where the Bong tree grows as a locale
- Where the Bong Tree Grows, a book by James Ramsey Ullman

Or in the song - The Moss by Cosmo Seldrake
