= Bilobalide =

Chemical compound

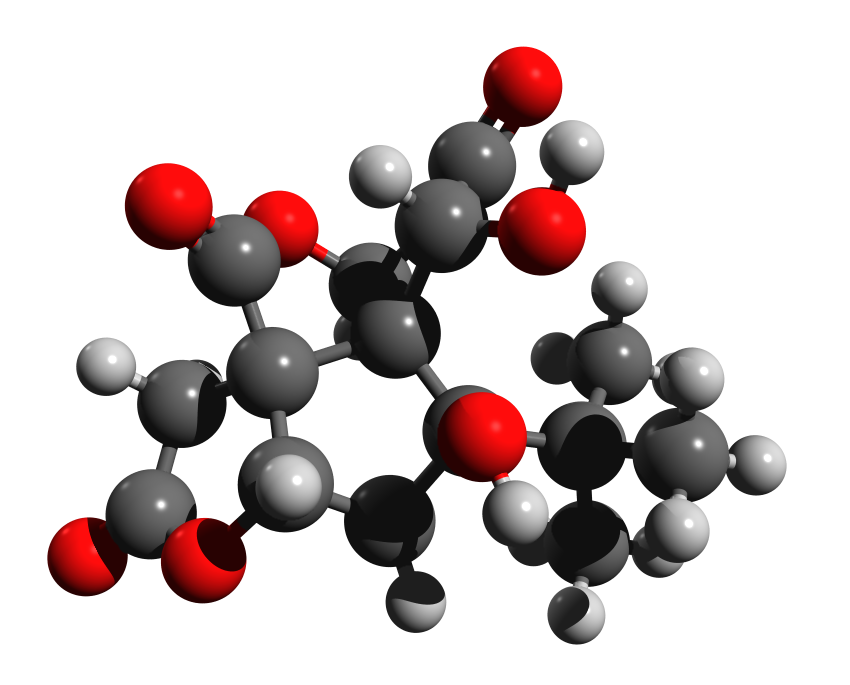

Clinical data
- Routes of administration: By mouth

Legal status
- Legal status: In general: legal

Identifiers
- IUPAC name: (5aR-(3aS*,5aα,8b,8aS*,9a,10aα))-9-(1,1-dimethylethyl)-10,10a-dihydro-8,9-dihydroxy-4H,5aH,9H-furo[2,3-b]furo[3',2':2,3]cyclopenta[1,2-c]furan-2,4,7(3H,8H)-trione
- CAS Number: 33570-04-6
- PubChem CID: 73581
- IUPHAR/BPS: 2366
- ChemSpider: 21106418
- UNII: M81D2O8H7U
- ChEBI: CHEBI:3103
- ChEMBL: ChEMBL133266
- CompTox Dashboard (EPA): DTXSID10873207
- ECHA InfoCard: 100.125.716

Chemical and physical data
- Formula: C_{15}H_{18}O_{8}
- Molar mass: 326.301 g·mol^{−1}
- 3D model (JSmol): Interactive image
- SMILES: CC(C)(C)[C@@]1(C[C@H]2[C@@]3([C@]14[C@H](C(=O)O[C@H]4OC3=O)O)CC(=O)O2)O
- InChI: InChI=1S/C15H18O8/c1-12(2,3)14(20)4-6-13(5-7(16)21-6)10(19)23-11-15(13,14)8(17)9(18)22-11/h6,8,11,17,20H,4-5H2,1-3H3/t6-,8-,11-,13-,14+,15?/m0/s1; Key:MOLPUWBMSBJXER-ISSLQHLCSA-N

Bilobalide is a biologically active terpenic trilactone present in Ginkgo biloba.

== Chemistry ==
Bilobalide is a main constituent of the terpenoids found in Ginkgo leaves. It also exists in minor amounts in the roots. It is a sesquiterpenoid, i.e. it has a 15-carbon skeleton. Its exact synthesis pathway from farnesyl pyrophosphate is still unknown.

== Biosynthesis ==
Bilobalide and ginkgolide have similar biosynthetic pathways. Bilobalide is formed by partially degraded ginkgolide. Bilobalide is derived from geranylgeranyl pyrophosphate (GGPP), which is formed by addition of farnesyl pyrophosphate (FPP) to an isopentenyl pyrophosphate (IPP) unit to form a C_{15} sesquiterpene. Such formation went through the mevalonate pathway (MVA) and methylerythritol phosphate MEP pathway. In order to generate bilobalide, C_{20} ginkgolide 13 must form first. To transform from GGPP to abietenyl cation 5, a single bifunctional enzyme abietadiene synthase E1 is required. However, due to the complexity of ginkgolide structures for rearrangement, ring cleavage, and formation of lactone rings, diterpene 8 is used to explain instead. Levopimaradiene 6 and abietatriene 7 are precursors for ginkgolide and bilobalide formation. The unusual tert-butyl substituent is formed from A ring cleavage in 9. Bilobalide 13 then formed in loss of carbons through degradation from ginkgolide 12, and lactones are formed from residual carboxyl and alcohol functions. The end product of bilobalide contains sesquiterpenes and three lactones units.

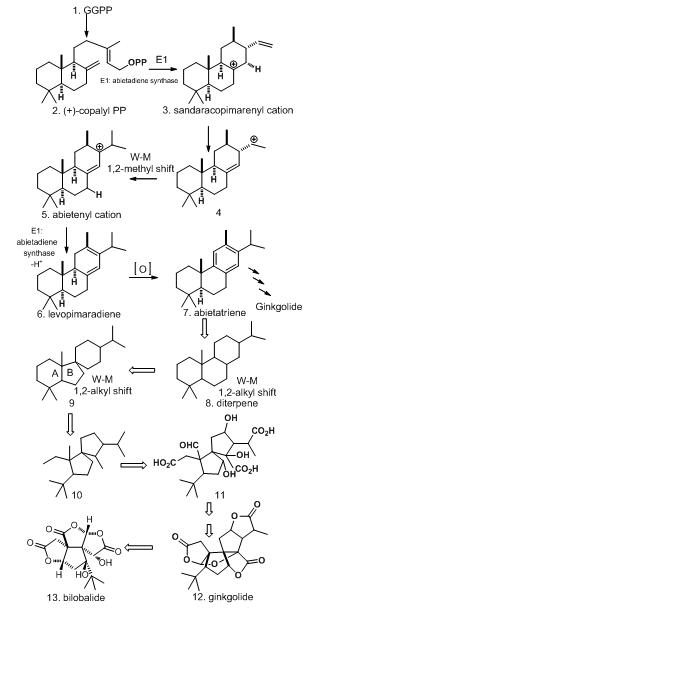

== Pharmacology ==
Bilobalide is important for producing several of the effects of Ginkgo biloba extracts, and it has neuroprotective effects, as well as inducing the liver enzymes CYP3A1 and CYP1A2, which may be partially responsible for interactions between ginkgo and other herbal medicines or pharmaceutical drugs. Bilobalide has recently been found to be a negative allosteric modulator at the GABA_{A} and GABA_{A}-rho receptors. Of GABA_{A}, it may possibly be selective for the subunits predominantly implicated in cognitive and memory functioning such as α1.

== See also ==
- Ginkgolide
