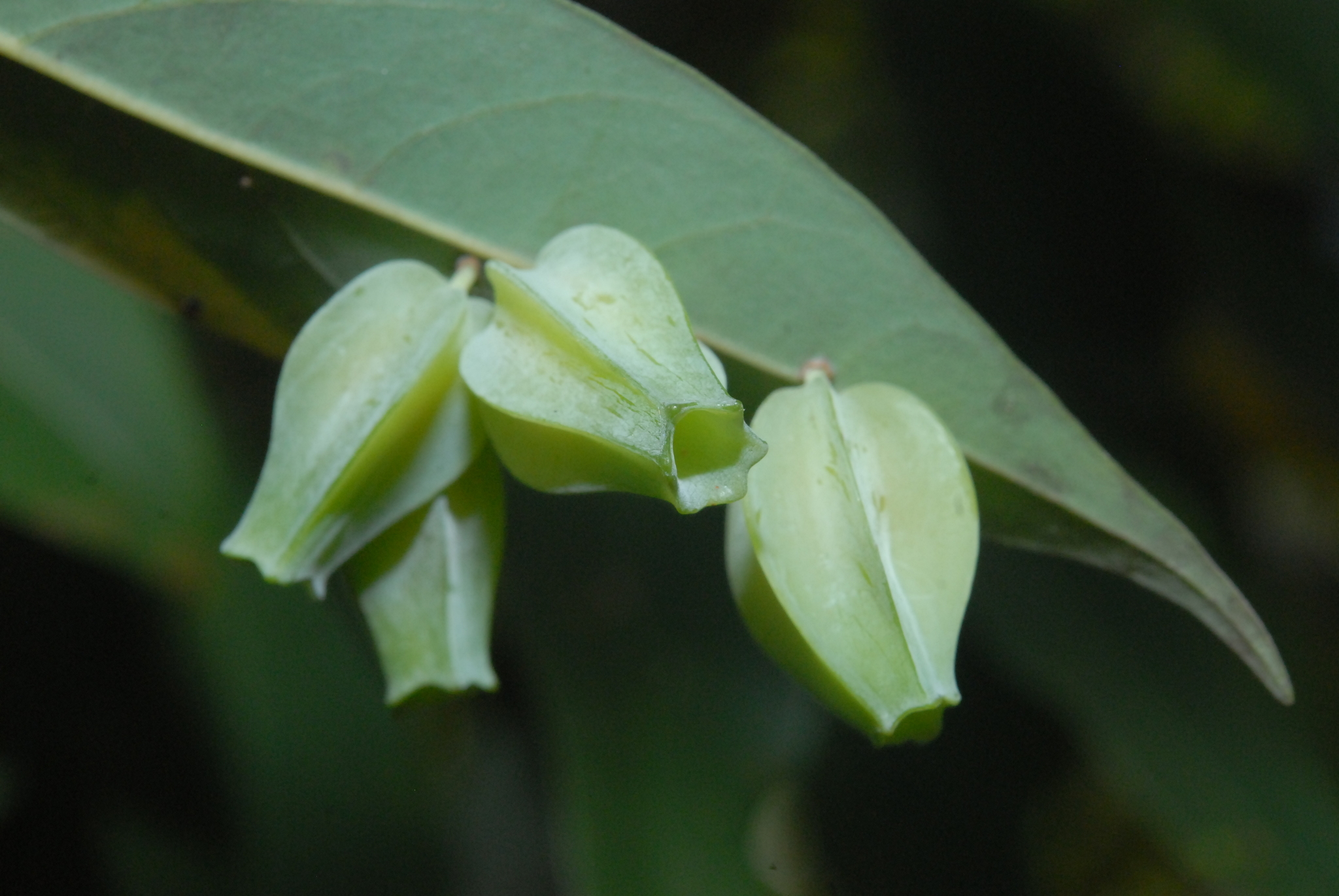
- Leaf galls caused by Daphnephila urnicola

Scientific classification
- Kingdom: Animalia
- Phylum: Arthropoda
- Class: Insecta
- Order: Diptera
- Family: Cecidomyiidae
- Subfamily: Cecidomyiinae
- Supertribe: Asphondyliidi
- Tribe: Asphondyliini
- Genus: Daphnephila; Kieffer, 1905

Species
- Daphnephila glandifex Kieffer, 1905; Daphnephila haasi Kieffer, 1905; Daphnephila linderae Kieffer, 1905; Daphnephila machilicola Yukawa, 1974; Daphnephila ornithocephala Tokuda, Yang & Yukawa, 2008; Daphnephila stenocalia Tokuda, Yang & Yukawa, 2008; Daphnephila sueyenae Tokuda, Yang & Yukawa, 2008; Daphnephila taiwanensis Tokuda, Yang & Yukawa, 2008; Daphnephila truncicola Tokuda, Yang & Yukawa, 2008; Daphnephila urnicola Pan et al., 2015

= Daphnephila =

Genus of flies

Daphnephila is a genus of gall midge that appears in the Palearctic and Oriental biogeographic realms. Daphnephila species create leaf and stem galls on species of laurel plants, particularly in Machilus. Based on analysis on sequences of the mitochondrial cytochrome c oxidase subunit I, it has been suggested that in this genus, the stem-galling habit is a more ancestral state as opposed to the leaf-galling habit.

Daphnephila was first described in 1905 by French entomologist Jean-Jacques Kieffer. It contains at least nine described species from India, Japan, and Taiwan, and many more undescribed species are known. The genus appears to have originated tropically and dispersed to Japan through Taiwan.

== Bibliography ==
- Tokuda, Makoto; Yang, Man-Miao; Yukawa, Junichi (2008). "Taxonomy and Molecular Phylogeny of Daphnephila Gall Midges (Diptera: Cecidomyiidae) Inducing Complex Leaf Galls on Lauraceae, with Descriptions of Five New Species Associated with Machilus thunbergii in Taiwan". Zoological Science. 25 (5): 533–545. doi:10.2108/zsj.25.533. ISSN 0289-0003. PMID 18558807. S2CID 32370318.
- Tokuda, Makoto; Yukawa, Junichi (2007-01-01). "Biogeography and evolution of gall midges (Diptera: Cecidomyiidae) inhabiting broad-leaved evergreen forests in Oriental and Eastern Palearctic regions". Oriental Insects. 41: 121–139. doi:10.1080/00305316.2007.10417502. S2CID 85241125.
- Pan, Liang-Yu; Chiang, Tung-Chuan; Weng, Yu-Chu; Chen, Wen-Neng; Hsiao, Shu-Chuan; Tokuda, Makoto; Tsai, Cheng-Lung; Yang, Man-Miao (2015-05-05). "Taxonomy and biology of a new ambrosia gall midge Daphnephila urnicola sp. nov. (Diptera: Cecidomyiidae) inducing urn-shaped leaf galls on two species of Machilus (Lauraceae) in Taiwan". Zootaxa. 3955 (3): 371–388. doi:10.11646/zootaxa.3955.3.5. ISSN 1175-5334. PMID 25947859.
- Yukawa, Junichi; Tokuda, Makoto (2006-07-01). "First Records of Genus Bruggmanniella (Diptera: Cecidomyiidae: Asphondyliini) from Palaearctic and Oriental Regions, with Descriptions of Two New Species That Induce Stem Galls on Lauraceae in Japan". Annals of the Entomological Society of America. 99 (4): 629–637. doi:10.1603/0013-8746(2006)99[629:FROGBD]2.0.CO;2. ISSN 0013-8746.
