= Red-headed wood pigeon =

Scientific classification
- Kingdom: Animalia
- Phylum: Chordata
- Class: Aves
- Order: Columbiformes
- Family: Columbidae
- Genus: Columba
- Species: C. janthina
- Subspecies: C. j. nitens

Trinomial name
- Columba janthina nitens Stejneger, 1887

Subspecies of bird

The red-headed wood pigeon (Columba janthina nitens) is a subspecies of black wood pigeon of the family Columbidae, identifiable by the red coloring the upper shoulder to top of head feathers. The red-headed wood pigeon is limited in its range to the Ogasawara Islands of Japan and eats primary fruit and seeds. Critically endangered, it is at risk because of extrinsic feral cat predation and intrinsic lack of genetic diversity due to genetic drift because of the low population size.

== Description ==
The red-headed wood pigeon has an average body length of 43 cm, with a large body, long neck and a small head. The body feathers are dark, black on the wings and tail and iridescent green on the chest. The red-headed wood pigeon differs visually from the black wood pigeon in the red coloring of the head, face, and upper back feathers and the black beak with a white tip.

== Distribution ==
The red-headed wood pigeon is only found on the Ogasawara Islands of Japan. Two primary distribution groups are seen with one centered on the Bonin Islands and the other on the Volcano Islands. There is movement between the two island groups due to foraging for limited food resources. The general preference for The red-headed wood pigeon to consume high lipid fruits to support crop milk production is observed to varying degrees on different islands, indicating the change in foraging preferences based on availability of resources on the different islands the birds are moving among.

== Conservation ==
The red-headed wood pigeon is critically endangered according to the Japanese Red List. The red-headed wood pigeon is endemic to remote islands resulting in a restricted habitat range that leads to small population sizes that result in low genetic diversity. Because of this isolation, the red-headed wood pigeon shows significant genetic differences from the other subspecies of black wood pigeon indicating the possible separation of red-headed wood pigeon into its own species.

Conservation efforts for the red-headed wood pigeon are focused on genetic diversity and habitat conservation. Habitat conservation efforts include, the eradication of the predatory wild cat population, protection of the preferable Volcano Island habitat, and the conservation of both native and non-native plant species the red-headed wood pigeon needs for its diet. The major threat to the genetic diversity of the red-headed wood pigeon is genetic drift as a result of the small population size.

The successful removal of the feral cat population, resulted in a large increase in population size from a historic low of less than 80 in 2008 to an estimated over 1000. This was possible because the deleterious mutations that built up where removed from the population though the prosses of genetic purging, resulting in overall more fit for survival population after the genetic bottleneck.
