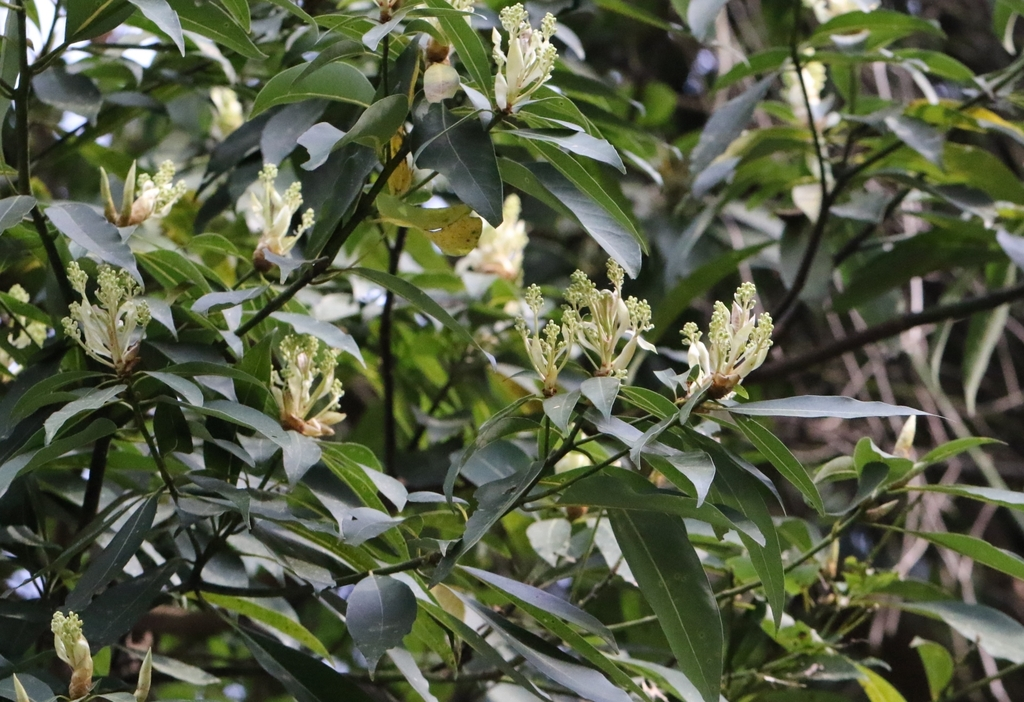
- Tai Po Kau, Hong Kong

Conservation status
- Least Concern (IUCN 3.1)

Scientific classification
- Kingdom: Plantae
- Clade: Tracheophytes
- Clade: Angiosperms
- Clade: Magnoliids
- Order: Laurales
- Family: Lauraceae
- Genus: Machilus
- Species: M. chekiangensis

Binomial name
- Machilus chekiangensis S.K.Lee

Synonyms
- Machilus longipedunculatus S.K.Lee & F.N.Wei; Persea chekiangensis (S.K.Lee) Kosterm.; Persea longipedunculata (S.K.Lee & F.N.Wei) Kosterm.

= Machilus chekiangensis =

Chekiang machilus

Species of tree

Machilus chekiangensis, commonly known as Chekiang machilus or Zhejiang machilus, is a species of tree native to southeastern China. It is native to Fujian, Hong Kong, and Zhejiang.

== Description ==
The tree grows 4–10 metres tall and is found in mixed broad-leaved forests. The bark is brown. Its branchlets are smooth and hairless and show notable bud scale scars at the base. The leaves are oblanceolate-shaped, with a tapering base, often clustered near the tips of the branchlets. Young leaves are slightly hairy, but become glossy as they mature. The flowers grow in panicles at the base of new shoots. They are yellow-green with six small petals. The fruits are drupes that turns black when matured.

=== Life cycle ===
The species flowers in February, and fruits from April to May.

== Ecology ==
The species is considered an soft-wooded, early-successional tree, noted for its rapid growth and preference for high light conditions. Its seeds are mainly dispersed by birds. In Hong Kong, members of the genus Machilus, such as M. chekiangensis, short-flowered machilus (M. breviflora), and many-nerved machilus (M. pauhoi), make up a significant proportion of secondary forests, where their establishment has limited the presence of species less adapted to low-light conditions. The species also tolerates nutrient-poor soils and is capable of persisting under partial shade, traits that contribute to its success.

Despite its adaptability, secondary forests dominated by M. chekiangensis are more vulnerable to severe storms. During Typhoon Mangkhut, strong wind uprooted thousands of trees, and remote sensing analyses recorded extensive canopy damage and biomass loss, particularly in young forests filled with M. chekiangensis and Mallotus paniculatus. Their fast growth and relatively soft wood increase vulnerability to uprooting and breakage. Low species diversity and structural weaknesses further reduce resilience, while recurrent storms tend to reinforce forests in an early successional state, slowing their development into more structurally complex and wind-resistant state.

== Uses ==
=== Reforestation ===
Due its fast growth, the species is frequently selected for reforestation projects, including initiatives carried out in 2009–2010. As its seedlings were not readily available on the market, they were propagated at the Tai Tong Nursery in Yuen Long for planting in country parks.

== Gallery ==
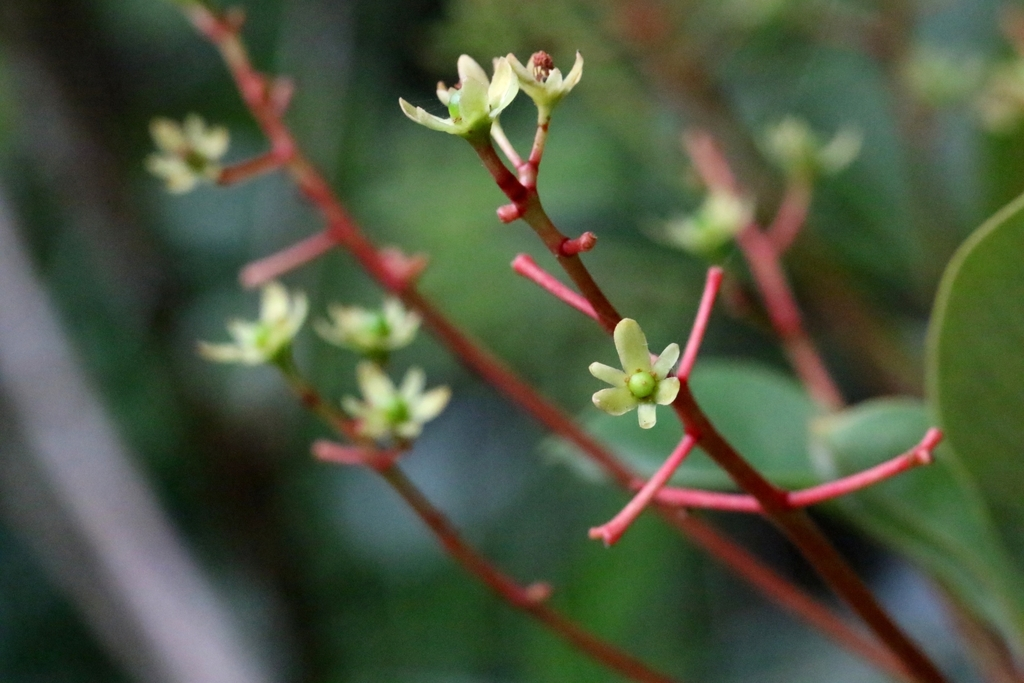

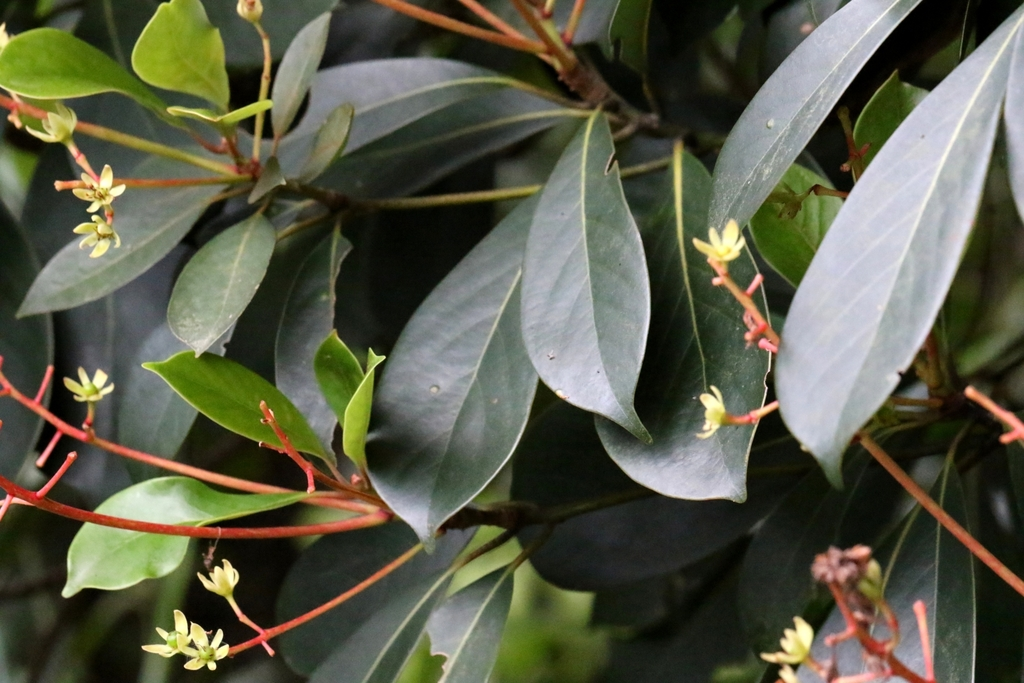
