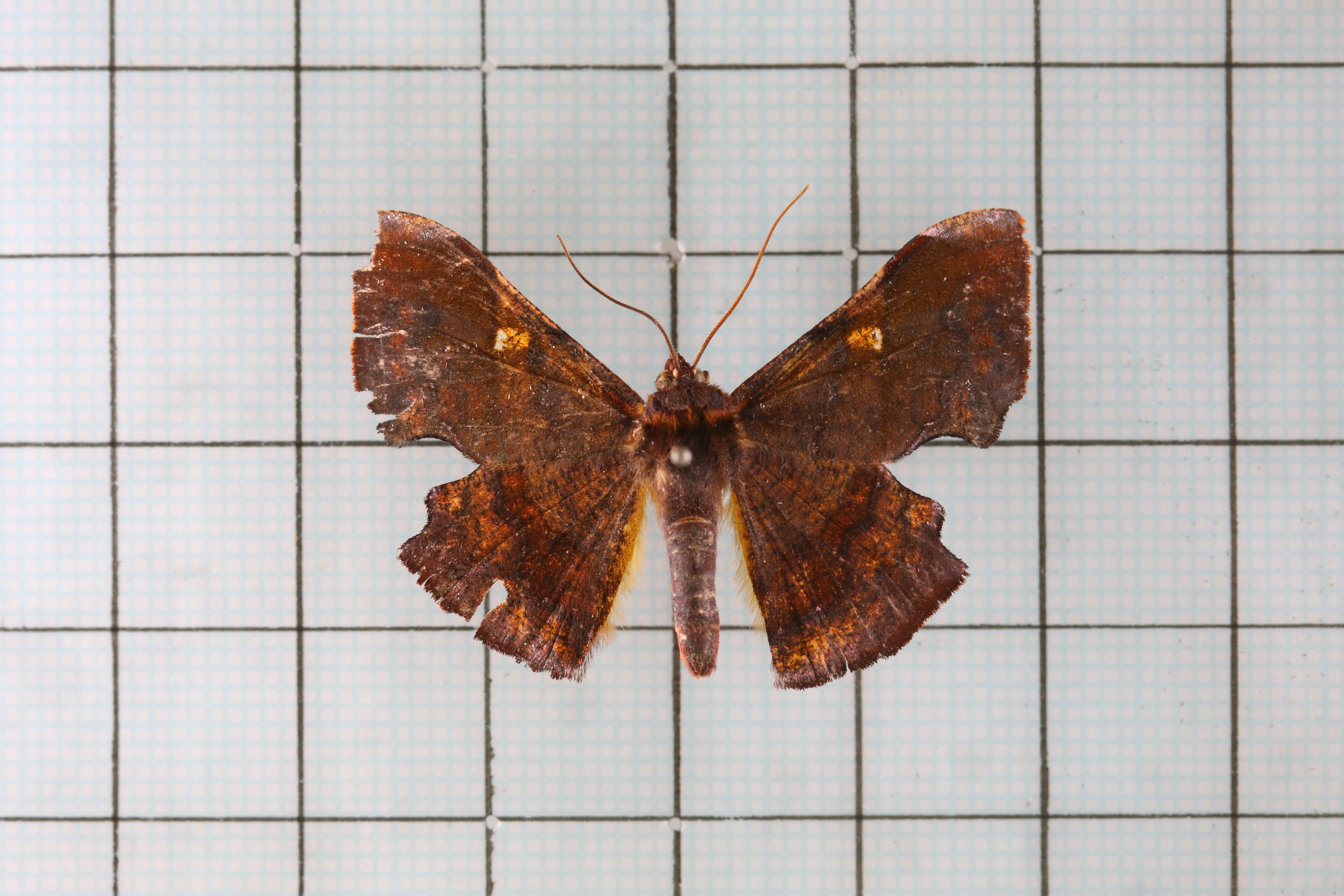
- Fascellina chromataria

Scientific classification
- Kingdom: Animalia
- Phylum: Arthropoda
- Class: Insecta
- Order: Lepidoptera
- Family: Geometridae
- Subfamily: Ennominae
- Genus: Fascellina; Walker, 1860

Synonyms
- Nysis Moore, 1867

= Fascellina =

Genus of moths

Fascellina is a genus of moths in the family Geometridae described by Francis Walker in 1860.

== Description ==
Its eyes are hairy. The palpi are stout and reach the vertex of the head, where the first joint is hairy and the third joint minute. Antennae with cilia and bristles. Abdomen stout. Hind tibia not dilated. Forewings with arched costa towards apex. Vein 3 from close to angle of cell and vein 5 from above middle of discocellulars. Vein 7 to 9 stalked from before upper angle. Veins 10 and 11 stalked and joined by bars to vein 12 and veins 8, 9. Hindwings with vein 3 from close to angle of cell.

== Species ==
- Fascellina albicordis Prout, 1932
- Fascellina altiplagiata Holloway, 1976
- Fascellina aua Prout, 1928
- Fascellina aurifera Warren, 1897
- Fascellina castanea Moore, 1877
- Fascellina cervinaria Snellen, 1881
- Fascellina chromataria Walker, 1860
- Fascellina clausaria Walker, 1866
- Fascellina cydra Prout, 1925
- Fascellina dacoda C. Swinhoe, 1893
- Fascellina glaucifulgurea Prout, 1916
- Fascellina inconspicua Warren, 1894
- Fascellina meligerys Prout, 1925
- Fascellina papuensis Warren, 1898
- Fascellina plagiata (Walker, 1866)
- Fascellina pulchracoda Holloway, 1993
- Fascellina punctata Warren, 1898
- Fascellina quadrata Holloway, 1993
- Fascellina rectimarginata Warren, 1894
- Fascellina subsignata Warren, 1893
- Fascellina viridicosta Holloway, 1993
