= Phyllocladan-16alpha-ol synthase =

Phyllocladan-16α-ol synthase

Identifiers
- EC no.: 4.2.3.45

Databases
- IntEnz: IntEnz view
- BRENDA: BRENDA entry
- ExPASy: NiceZyme view
- KEGG: KEGG entry
- MetaCyc: metabolic pathway
- PRIAM: profile
- PDB structures: RCSB PDB PDBe PDBsum
Search
- PMC: articles
- PubMed: articles
- NCBI: proteins

Phyllocladan-16α-ol synthase (EC 4.2.3.45, PaDC1) is an enzyme with systematic name (+)-copalyl-diphosphate diphosphate-lyase (phyllocladan-16α-ol-forming). This enzyme catalyses the following chemical reaction

(+)-copalyl diphosphate + H_{2}O $\rightleftharpoons$ phyllocladan-16α-ol + diphosphate

The adjacent gene PaDC2 codes EC 5.5.1.12, copalyl diphosphate synthase.
