= Abietadiene synthase =

Class of enzymes

abieta-7,13-diene synthase

Identifiers
- EC no.: 4.2.3.18
- CAS no.: 157972-08-2

Databases
- IntEnz: IntEnz view
- BRENDA: BRENDA entry
- ExPASy: NiceZyme view
- KEGG: KEGG entry
- MetaCyc: metabolic pathway
- PRIAM: profile
- PDB structures: RCSB PDB PDBe PDBsum
- Gene Ontology: AmiGO / QuickGO
Search
- PMC: articles
- PubMed: articles
- NCBI: proteins

The enzyme abieta-7,13-diene synthase (EC 4.2.3.18) catalyzes the chemical reaction

(+)-copalyl diphosphate $\rightleftharpoons$ abieta-7,13-diene + diphosphate

This enzyme belongs to the family of lyases, specifically those carbon-oxygen lyases acting on phosphates. The systematic name of this enzyme class is (+)-copalyl-diphosphate diphosphate-lyase [cyclizing, abieta-7,13-diene-forming]. This enzyme is also called copalyl-diphosphate diphosphate-lyase (cyclizing). This enzyme participates in diterpenoid biosynthesis.

It has recently been shown (Keeling, et al., 2011) that the orthologous gene in Norway spruce (Picea abies) does not produce abietadiene directly, but instead produces a thermally unstable allylic tertiary alcohol 13-hydroxy-8(14)- abietene, which readily dehydrates to abietadiene, levopimaradiene, palustradiene, and neoabietadiene, when analyzed by the commonly used gas chromatography. This has been confirmed in the other conifer species, lodgepole pine (Pinus contorta) and jack pine (Pinus banksiana) (Hall et al., 2013).
