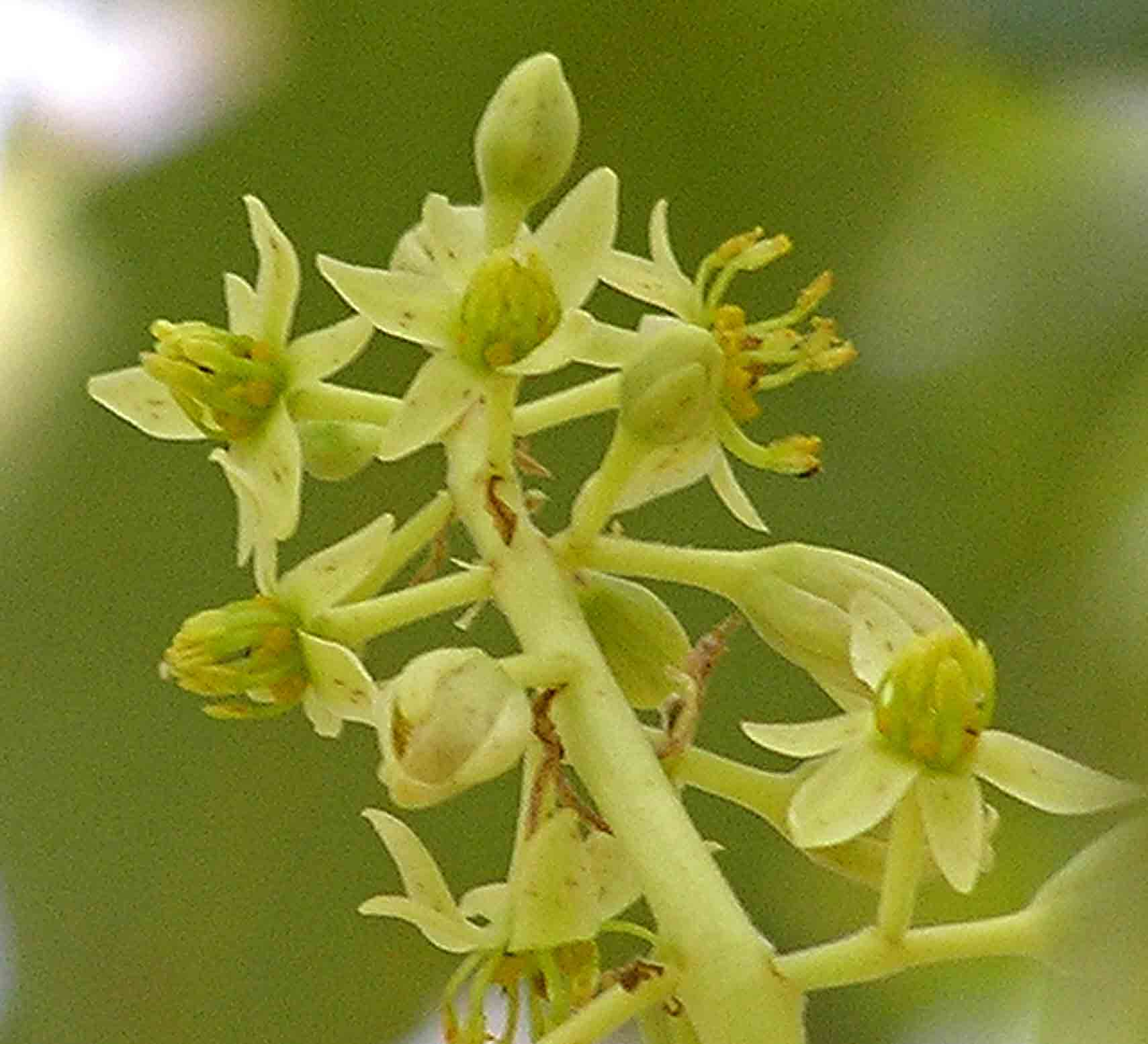

Conservation status
- Near Threatened (IUCN 3.1)

Scientific classification
- Kingdom: Plantae
- Clade: Tracheophytes
- Clade: Angiosperms
- Clade: Magnoliids
- Order: Laurales
- Family: Lauraceae
- Genus: Machilus
- Species: M. wangchiana

Binomial name
- Machilus wangchiana Chun

Synonyms
- Persea kadooriei Kosterm.; Persea wangchiana (Chun) Kosterm.

= Machilus wangchiana =

Avocado species endemic to Hong Kong, China

Machilus wangchiana (or Machilus wangchianus) is a tree of the Lauraceae family and is an avocado species endemic to China. It is native to Guizhou, Guangxi, and Guangdong provinces in southern China.

It was described in 1953 by the botanist Woon Young Chun in 1953 and was published in Acta Phytotaxonomica Sinica. It has two synonyms; Persea wangchiana and Persea kadooriei which was described by the botanist André Joseph Guillaume Henri Kostermans in 1981 as published in Journal of South African Botany.
