= Levopimaradiene synthase =

Identifiers
- EC no.: 4.2.3.32

Databases
- IntEnz: IntEnz view
- BRENDA: BRENDA entry
- ExPASy: NiceZyme view
- KEGG: KEGG entry
- MetaCyc: metabolic pathway
- PRIAM: profile
- PDB structures: RCSB PDB PDBe PDBsum
Search
- PMC: articles
- PubMed: articles
- NCBI: proteins

Levopimaradiene synthase (EC 4.2.3.32, PtTPS-LAS, LPS, copalyl-diphosphate diphosphate-lyase [abieta-8(14),12-diene-forming]) is an enzyme with systematic name (+)-copalyl-diphosphate diphosphate-lyase (abieta-8(14),12-diene-forming). This enzyme catalyses the following chemical reaction

(+)-copalyl diphosphate $\rightleftharpoons$ abieta-8(14),12-diene + diphosphate

In Ginkgo, the enzyme catalyses the initial cyclization step in the biosynthesis of ginkgolides.
