= Abietatriene =

Names
- IUPAC name (4aS,10aS)-1,1,4a-trimethyl-7-propan-2-yl-2,3,4,9,10,10a-hexahydrophenanthrene

Identifiers
CAS Number	19407-28-4
3D model (JSmol)	Interactive image
ChEBI	CHEBI:86062
ChEMBL	ChEMBL3343789
ChemSpider	4937470
KEGG	C21425
PubChem CID	6432211
- InChI: InChI=1S/C20H30/c1-14(2)15-7-9-17-16(13-15)8-10-18-19(3,4)11-6-12-20(17,18)5/h7,9,13-14,18H,6,8,10-12H2,1-5H3/t18-,20+/m0/s1 Key: QUUCYKKMFLJLFS-AZUAARDMSA-N
- SMILES: CC(C)C1=CC2=C(C=C1)[C@]3(CCCC([C@@H]3CC2)(C)C)C

Properties
Chemical formula	C_{20}H_{30}
Molar mass	270.460 g·mol^{−1}
- Except where otherwise noted, data are given for materials in their standard state (at 25 °C [77 °F], 100 kPa). Infobox references

Abietatriene is a diterpene, C_{20}H_{30}, that is abietane having three double bonds located at the positions 8, 11, and 13. It has a role as a plant metabolite and derives from a hydride of an abietane.
