= Machilus kurzii =

Conservation status
- Least Concern (IUCN 3.1)

Scientific classification
- Kingdom: Plantae
- Clade: Tracheophytes
- Clade: Angiosperms
- Clade: Magnoliids
- Order: Laurales
- Family: Lauraceae
- Genus: Machilus
- Species: M. kurzii

Binomial name
- Machilus kurzii King ex Hook.f.

Synonyms
- Persea kurzii (King ex Hook.f.) Kosterm.

Species of tree

Machilus kurzii is a species of flowering plant in the laurel family (Lauraceae). It is native to mainland tropical Asia.

== Description ==
Machilus kurzii is a small to medium-sized tree, growing 8 to 15 meters tall.

== Range and habitat ==
Machilus kurzii ranges from the Eastern Himalayas in the west through northern Indochina and southern China (Yunnan province).

It is native to montane evergreen broadleaf forests and secondary growth, sometimes over limestone, between 800 and 2,000 meters elevation.

== Human use ==
In Laos, the bark of Machilus kurzii, known as bong tree or yangbong, is harvested for gum and aromatic oils which are used to make incense sticks. Bong tree bark from wild trees has been over-harvested from wild trees, and wild tree populations have declined significantly. Since the early 2000s Laotians have been establishing hillside commercial bong tree plantations.
