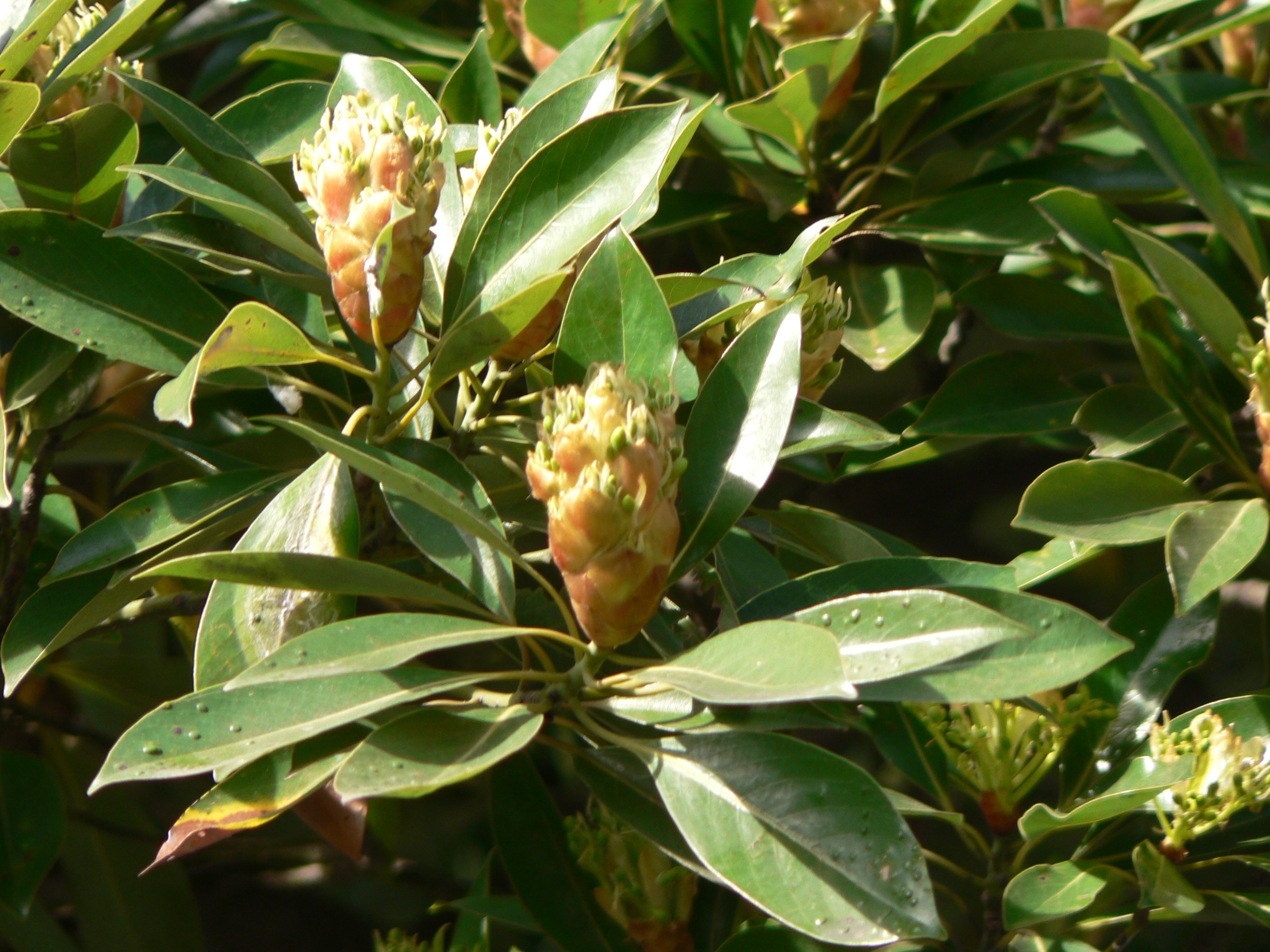
- Machilus thunbergii leaves, also known as Persea thunbergii

Scientific classification
- Kingdom: Plantae
- Clade: Tracheophytes
- Clade: Angiosperms
- Clade: Magnoliids
- Order: Laurales
- Family: Lauraceae
- Genus: Machilus; Nees

Species
- See text

= Machilus =

Genus of flowering plants

Machilus is a genus of flowering plants in the family Lauraceae. It is found in temperate, subtropical, and tropical forest, occurring in China, Korea, Japan, Taiwan, Indochina, the Indian subcontinent, Malaysia, Indonesia, and the Philippines.

Its delimitation versus the closely related avocados (genus Persea) has been disputed, with some Persea species such as coyo (P.schiedeana) sometimes placed in Machilus, or all of Machilus being included in Persea. As circumscribed here – distinct from Persea but excluding American species – Machilus currently includes about 100 species.

== Description ==
Machilus are evergreen trees or shrubs, some species growing as much as 30 m tall. Their entire, pinnately veined leaves are alternately borne along the stems. Their bisexual flowers are borne in inflorescences that are usually paniculate, terminal, subterminal, or arising from near base of branchlets, with long peduncles or rarely without peduncles. Perianth tubes are short; perianth lobes 6 in 2 series, equal, subequal, or occasionally outer ones conspicuously smaller than inner ones, usually persistent, rarely deciduous. Fertile stamens 9 in 3 series, anthers 4-celled, 1st and 2nd series of stamens eglandular, anthers introrse, 3rd series of stamens glandular, anthers extrorse or lateral, glands stipitate to sessile. Staminodes in 4th series, sagittate. Ovary sessile; stigmas small, dish-shaped or capitate. Fruits are fleshy, globose, rarely ellipsoid or oblong, subtended at base by persistent and reflexed perianth lobes; the fruiting pedicel does not become enlarged.

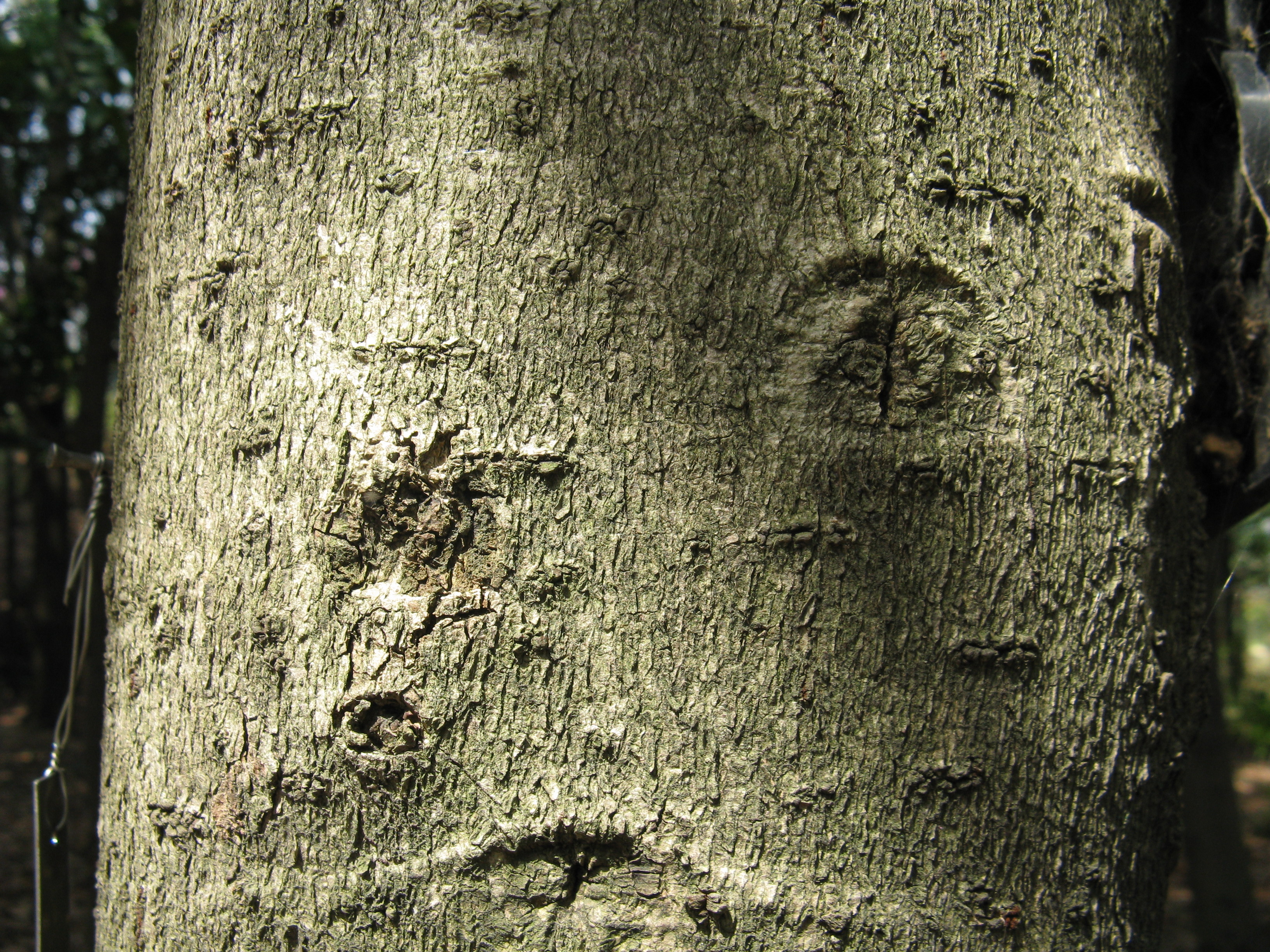
M. japonica

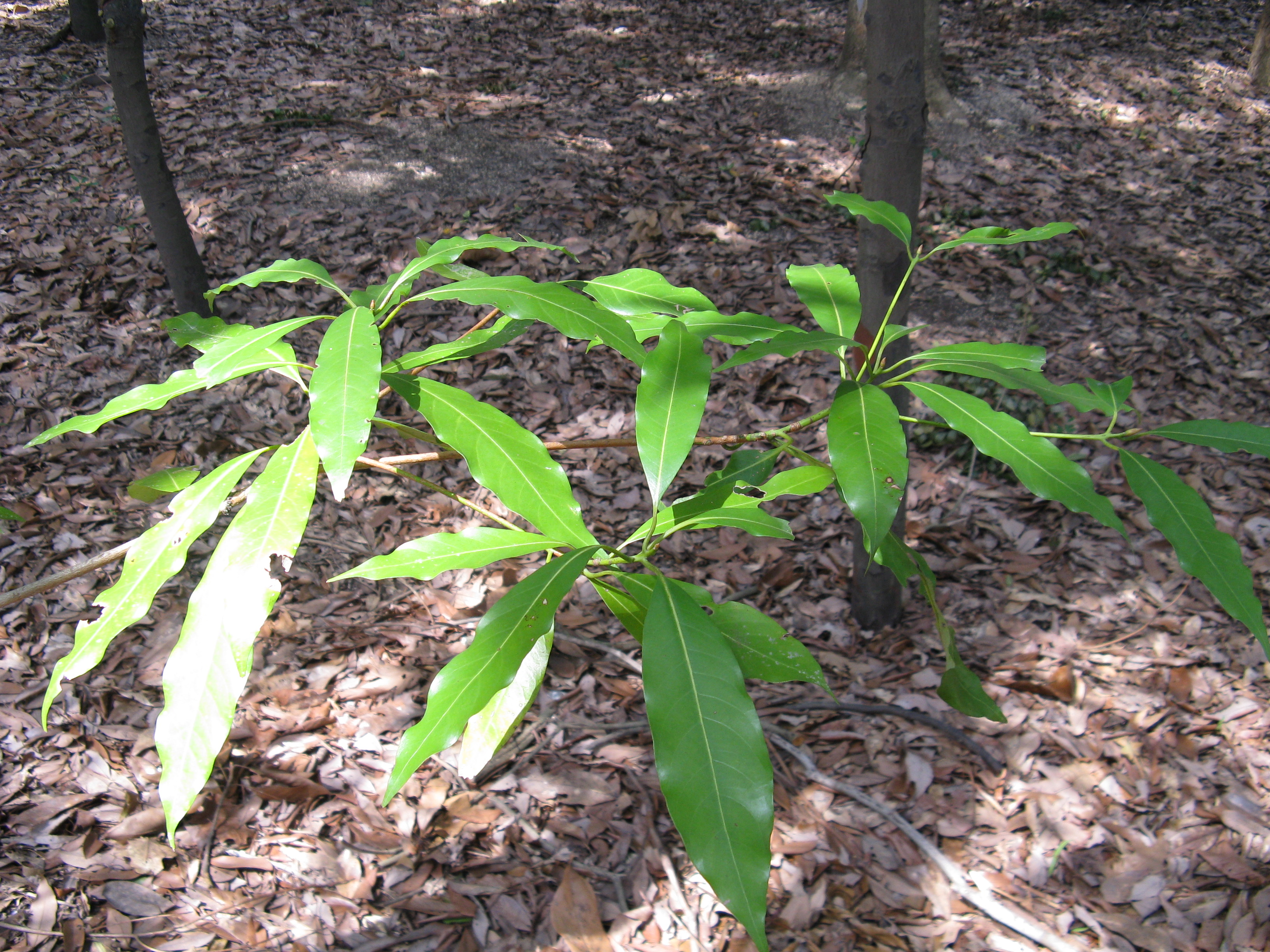
M. japonica

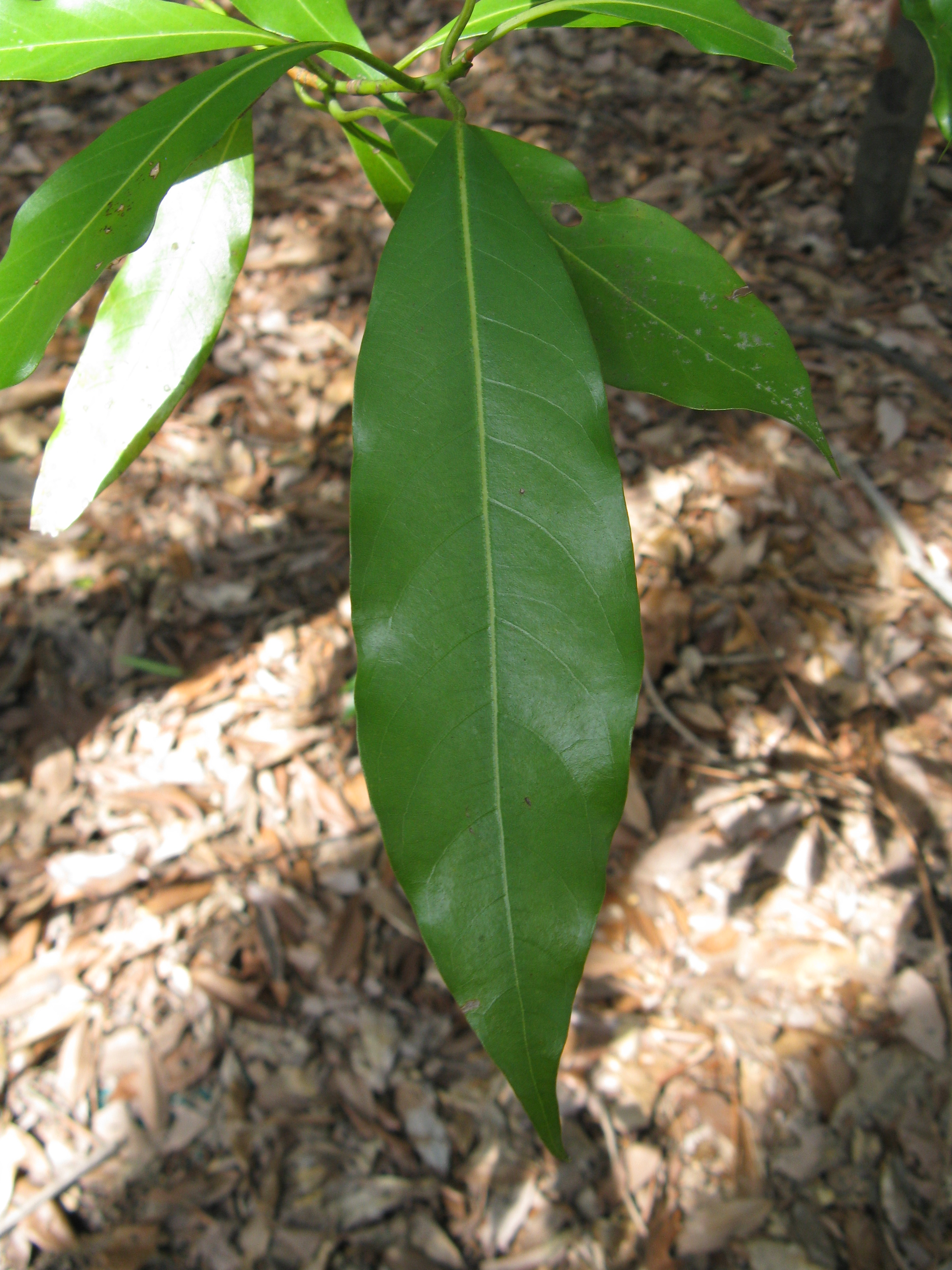
M. japonica

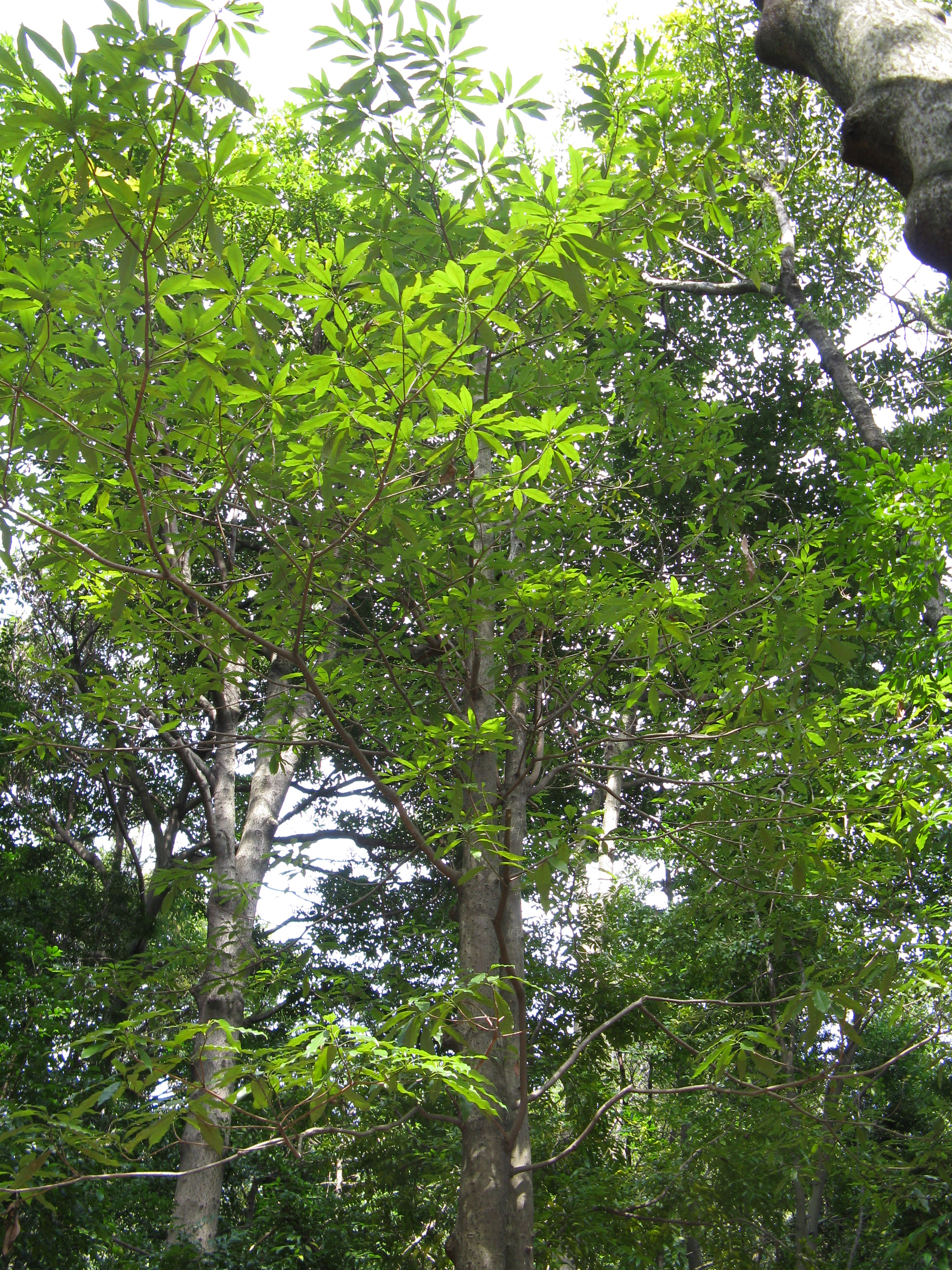
M. japonica

== Species ==
The genus includes the following species:

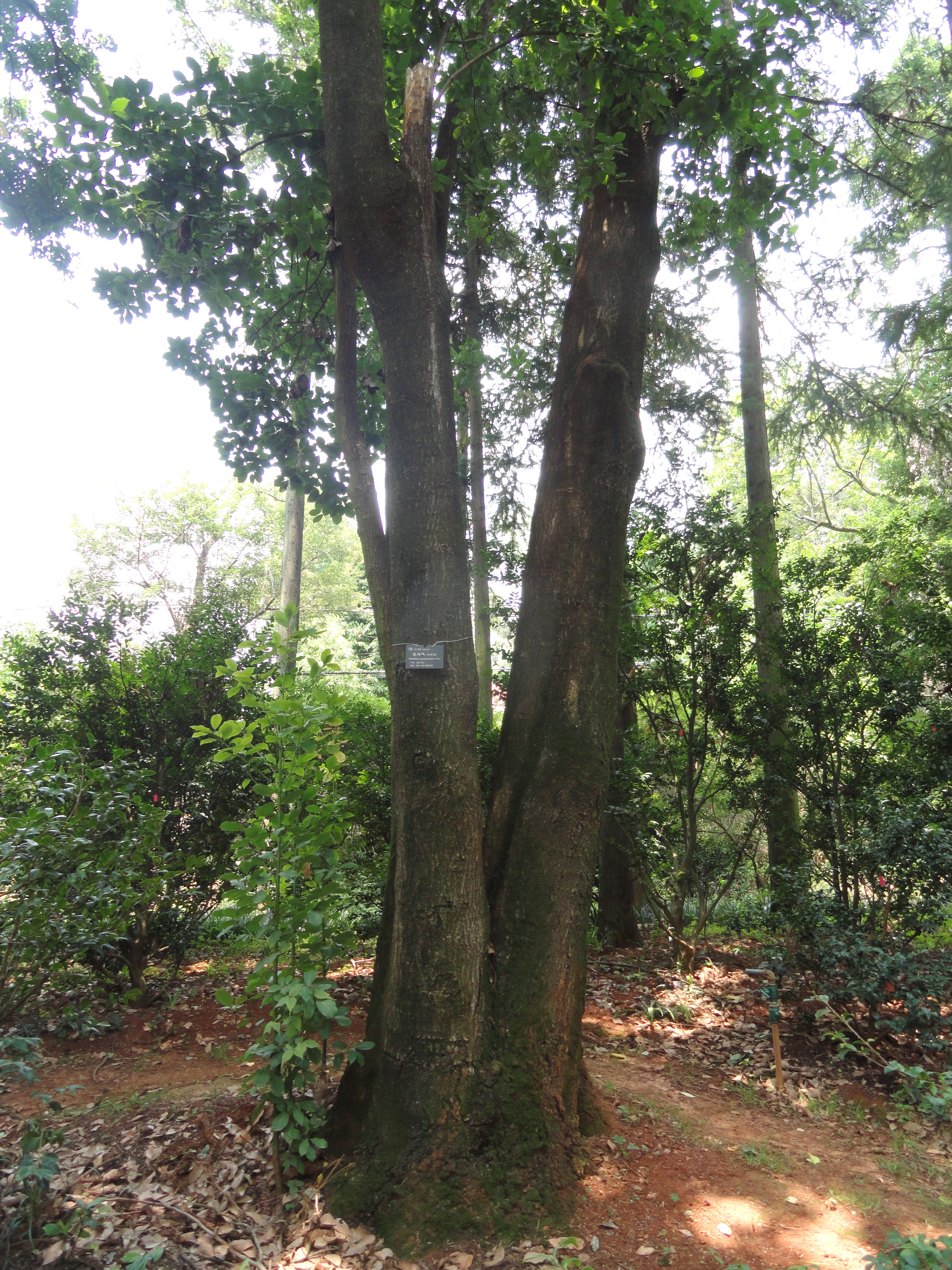
Machilus yunnanensis, also known as Persea yunnanensis

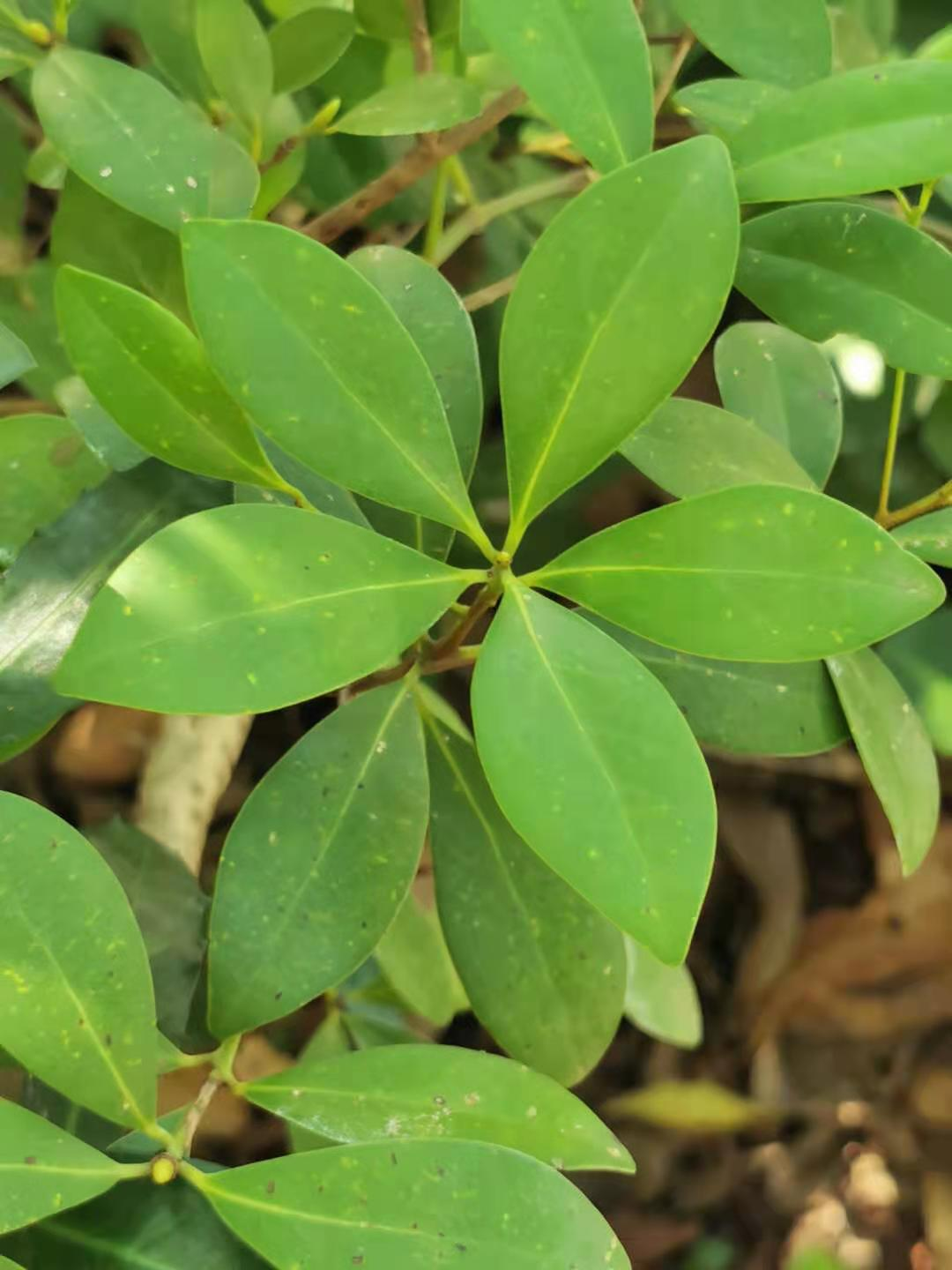
M. obovatifolia. Leaf obovate or ovate-elliptic is the main feature of M. obovatifolia among Machilus. Endemic to Taiwan.

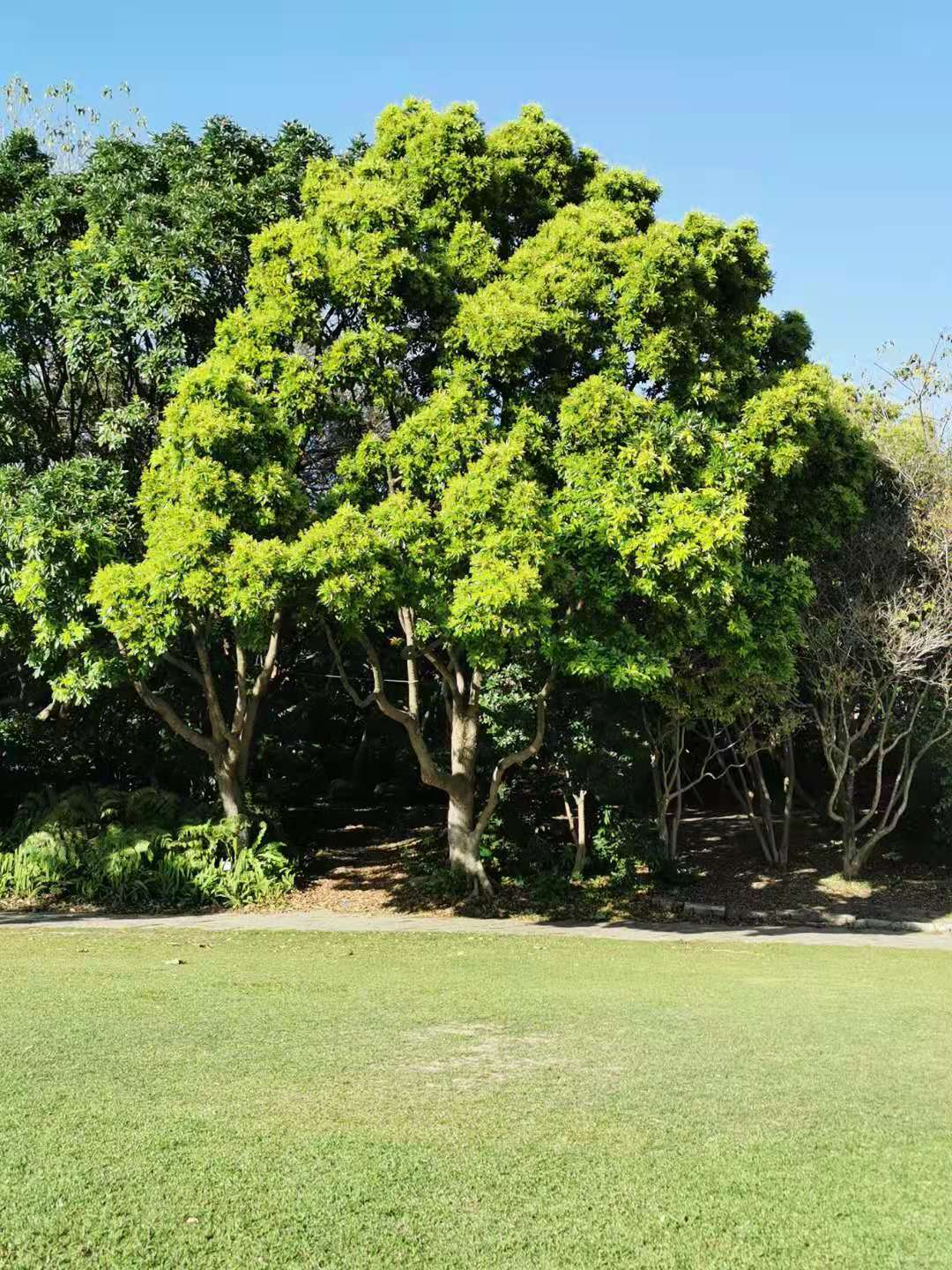
M. kusanoi. The height of the tree and the large leaves are the obvious characteristics of M. kusanoi in the same genus. Endemic to Taiwan.

- Machilus angustifolius Mase, Tagane & Yahara
- Machilus arunachalensis (M.Gangop.) Anand Kumar
- Machilus attenuatus F.N.Wei & S.C.Tang – China (Guangxi)
- Machilus austroguizhouensis S.K. Lee & F.N. Wei – China (Guizhou and Guangxi)
- Machilus balansae (Airy Shaw) F.N. Wei & S.C. Tang – northern Vietnam
- Machilus bhaskarii (M.Gangop.) Anand Kumar
- Machilus bokorensis Yahara & Tagane – Cambodia
- Machilus bonii Lecomte – China (southeastern Yunnan, southwestern Guizhou, and western Guangxi) and Vietnam
- Machilus boninensis Koidz. – Ogasawara Islands
- Machilus breviflorus (Benth.) Hemsl. – China (Guangxi, Guangdong, Hong Kong, and Hainan)
- Machilus brevipaniculatus Yahara & Tagane – Cambodia
- Machilus calcicola C.J. Qi – China (northeastern Guangxi, Guangdong, and Hunan)
- Machilus cambodianus Mase, Tagane & Yahara – described from Keo Seima Wildlife Sanctuary, Cambodia
- Machilus cavaleriei H. Lév. – China (southern Guizhou and northwestern Guangxi) and Vietnam
- Machilus champasakensis Tagane & Soulad.
- Machilus chartaceus (Kosterm.) D.J.Middleton
- Machilus chayuensis S.K. Lee – southeastern Tibet
- Machilus chekiangensis S.K. Lee – China (Hong Kong, Fujian, and Zhejiang)
- Machilus chienkweiensis S.K. Lee – China (southeastern Guizhou and northern Guangxi)
- Machilus chinensis (Benth.) Hemsl. – China (Guangxi, Guangdong, and Hong Kong) and Vietnam
- Machilus chrysotrichus H.W.Li – China (northwestern and central Yunnan)
- Machilus chuanchienensis S.K.Lee – China (southeastern Sichuan and northeastern Guizhou)
- Machilus cicatricosus S.K. Lee – Vietnam and Hainan
- Machilus clarkeanus King ex Hook.f. – Nepal, East Himalaya, eastern India, and Myanmar
- Machilus cochinchinensis Lecomte – Laos and Vietnam
- Machilus coriaceus A.Chev. – Vietnam
- Machilus curranii Merr. – Luzon
- Machilus daozhenensis Y.K. Li – China (Daozhen in Guizhou)
- Machilus declinatus (Blume) de Kok – Myanmar, Peninsular Malaysia, Sumatra, and Java
- Machilus decursinervis Chun – southern China and Vietnam
- Machilus dinganensis S.K. Lee & F.N. Wei – China (Guangdong and Hainan)
- Machilus dubius Das & P.C.Kanjilal – Bhutan, East Himalaya, and eastern India
- Machilus dumicola (W.W. Sm.) H.W. Li
- Machilus duthiei King
- Machilus edulis King ex Hook.f.
- Machilus elephanti Mase, Tagane & Yahara
- Machilus fasciculatus H.W. Li
- Machilus foonchewii S.K. Lee
- Machilus forrestii (W.W.Sm.) L.Li, J.Li & H.W.Li
- Machilus fruticosus Kurz
- Machilus fukienensis Hung T. Chang
- Machilus gamblei King ex Hook. f.
- Machilus garrettii D.J.Middleton
- Machilus glabrophyllus J.F. Zuo
- Machilus glaucifolius S.K. Lee & F.N. Wei
- Machilus gongshanensis H.W. Li
- Machilus gracillimus Chun
- Machilus grandibracteatus S.K. Lee & F.N. Wei
- Machilus grijsii Hance
- Machilus hedgei (M.Gangop. & A.Sarmah) Chakrab., Ghoshal, Anand Kumar & V.K.Rawat
- Machilus hemsleyi Nakai
- Machilus himalayensis M.Gangop.
- Machilus holadenus H. Liu
- Machilus ichangensis Rehder & E.H. Wilson
- Machilus japonicus Siebold & Zucc.
- Machilus kerrii (Gamble) Mase, Tagane & Yahara
- Machilus kingii Hook.f.
- Machilus kobu Maxim.
- Machilus kochummenii de Kok
- Machilus konishii Hayata
- Machilus kurzii King ex Hook. f.
- Machilus kwangtungensis Yen C. Yang
- Machilus lenticellatus S.K. Lee & F.N. Wei
- Machilus leptophyllus Hand.-Mazz.
- Machilus lichuanensis W.C. Cheng
- Machilus listeri King ex Hook.f.
- Machilus litseifolius S.K. Lee
- Machilus lohitensis (M.Gangop.) M.Gangop.
- Machilus lohuiensis S.K. Lee
- Machilus longipes Hung T. Chang
- Machilus macranthus Nees
- Machilus magniperulatus (Kosterm.) D.J.Middleton
- Machilus mangdangshanensis Q.F. Zheng
- Machilus melanophyllus H.W. Li
- Machilus miaoshanensis F.N. Wei & C.Q. Lin
- Machilus microcarpus Hemsl.
- Machilus microphyllus (H.W.Li) L.Li, J.Li & H.W.Li
- Machilus minkweiensis S.K. Lee
- Machilus minutiflorus (H.W.Li) L.Li, J.Li & H.W.Li
- Machilus minutilobus S.K. Lee
- Machilus montanus L.Li, J.Li & H.W.Li
- Machilus monticolus S.K. Lee
- Machilus multinervius H. Liu
- Machilus nakaoi S.K. Lee
- Machilus nanchuanensis N. Chao
- Machilus nanmu (Oliv.) Hemsl.
- Machilus obovatifolius (Hayata) Kaneh. & Sasaki
- Machilus obscurinervis S.K. Lee
- Machilus oculodracontis Chun
- Machilus odoratissimus Nees
- Machilus oreophilus Hance
- Machilus ovatilobus S.K. Lee
- Machilus parabreviflorus Hung T. Chang
- Machilus parapauhoi F.N.Wei, S.C.Tang & W.B.Xu
- Machilus parviflorus Meisn.
- Machilus pauhoi Kaneh.
- Machilus phoenicis Dunn
- Machilus platycarpus Chun
- Machilus pomifer (Kosterm.) S.K. Lee
- Machilus pseudokobu Koidz.
- Machilus pubescens Blume
- Machilus pyramidalis H.W. Li
- Machilus rehderi C.K.Allen
- Machilus reticulatus K.M.Lan
- Machilus rimosus (Blume) Blume
- Machilus robustus W.W.Sm.
- Machilus rufipes H.W.Li
- Machilus salicinus Hance
- Machilus salicoides S.K.Lee
- Machilus seimensis Mase, Tagane & Yahara – described from Keo Seima Wildlife Sanctuary, Cambodia
- Machilus sericeus (Nees) Blume
- Machilus shiwandashanicus Hung T.Chang
- Machilus shweliensis W.W.Sm.
- Machilus sichourensis H.W.Li
- Machilus sichuanensis N. Chao
- Machilus sikkimensis (M.Gangop.) M.Gangop.
- Machilus submultinervius Y.K.Li
- Machilus suddeei D.J.Middleton
- Machilus sumatranus (Kosterm.) F.N. Wei & S.C.Tang
- Machilus tenuipilis H.W. Li
- Machilus thailandicus D.J.Middleton
- Machilus thunbergii Siebold & Zucc.
- Machilus tingzhourensis M.M. Lin, T.F. Que & S.Q. Zheng
- Machilus velutinus Champ. ex Benth.
- Machilus verruculosus H.W. Li
- Machilus versicolorus S.K. Lee & F.N. Wei
- Machilus viridis Hand.-Mazz.
- Machilus wangchianus Chun
- Machilus wenshanensis H.W. Li
- Machilus yunnanensis Lecomte
- Machilus zuihoensis Hayata
