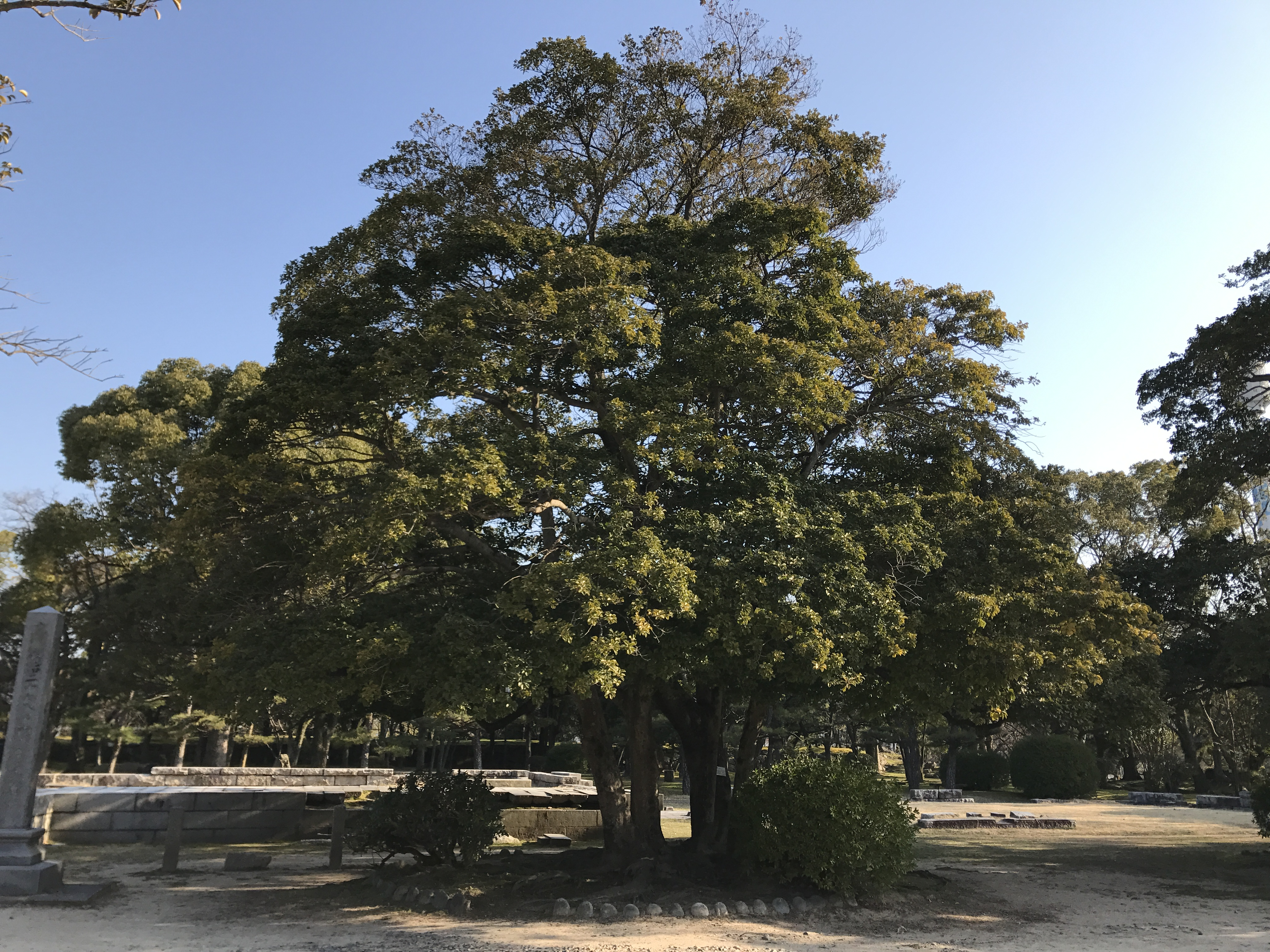
- In Hiroshima Castle
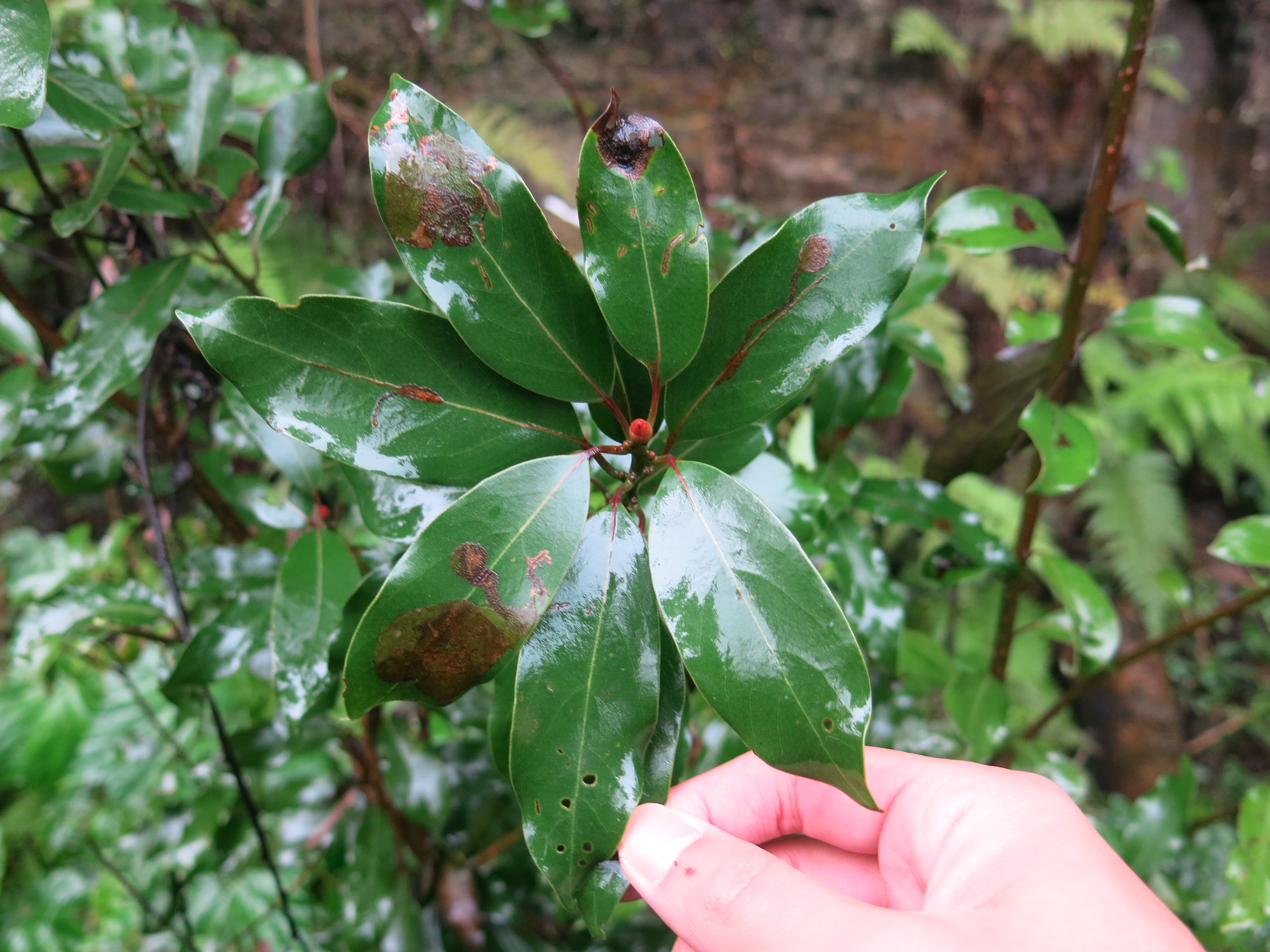
- Close up of leaves

Conservation status
- Least Concern (IUCN 3.1)

Scientific classification
- Kingdom: Plantae
- Clade: Embryophytes
- Clade: Tracheophytes
- Clade: Spermatophytes
- Clade: Angiosperms
- Clade: Magnoliids
- Order: Laurales
- Family: Lauraceae
- Genus: Machilus
- Species: M. thunbergii

Binomial name
- Machilus thunbergii Siebold & Zucc.

Synonyms
- List: Laurus indica Thunb.; Machilus arisanensis (Hayata) Hayata; Machilus kwashotensis Hayata; Machilus nanshoensis Kaneh.; Machilus taiwanensis Kamik.; Persea arisanensis (Hayata) Kosterm.; Persea thunbergii (Siebold & Zucc.) Kosterm.

= Machilus thunbergii =

Species of flowering plant

Machilus thunbergii (syn. Persea thunbergii), the Japanese bay tree, red machilus, or tabunoki, is a widespread species of flowering plant in the family Lauraceae. It is native to Vietnam, Taiwan, southeast and north-central China, the Korean Peninsula, and Japan. A sturdy evergreen tree, usually 10–15 m (30–50 ft) tall, and reaching 20 m (70 ft), it is used for timber, and as a street tree. Its bark is the source of makko, a powder used to make a mosquito‑repelling incense. It prefers coastal areas, and can handle saline soil.

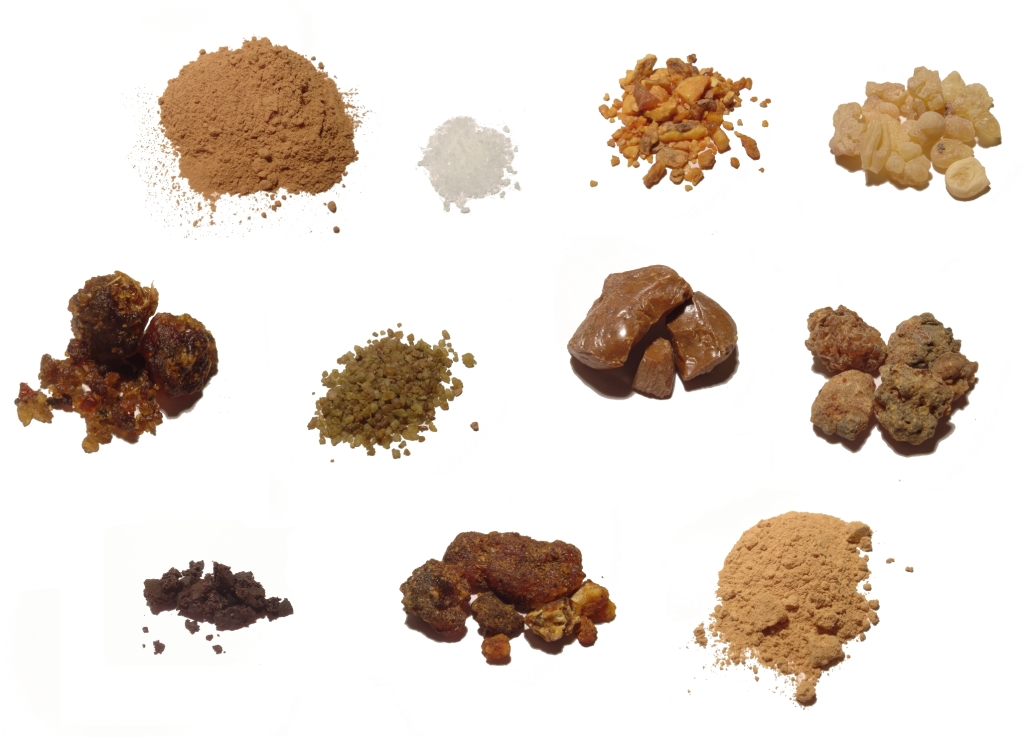
Makko powder, top left

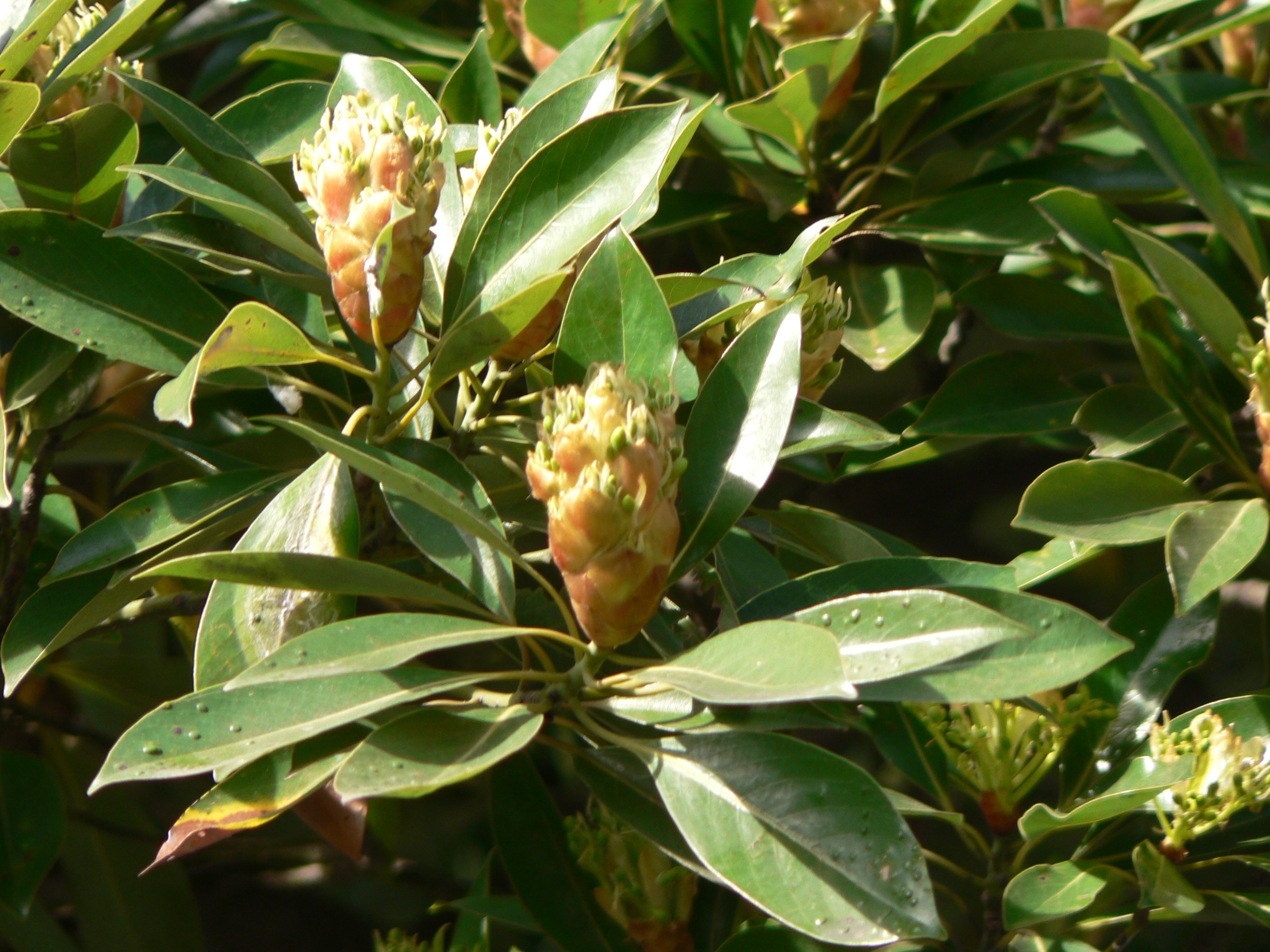
Flowers

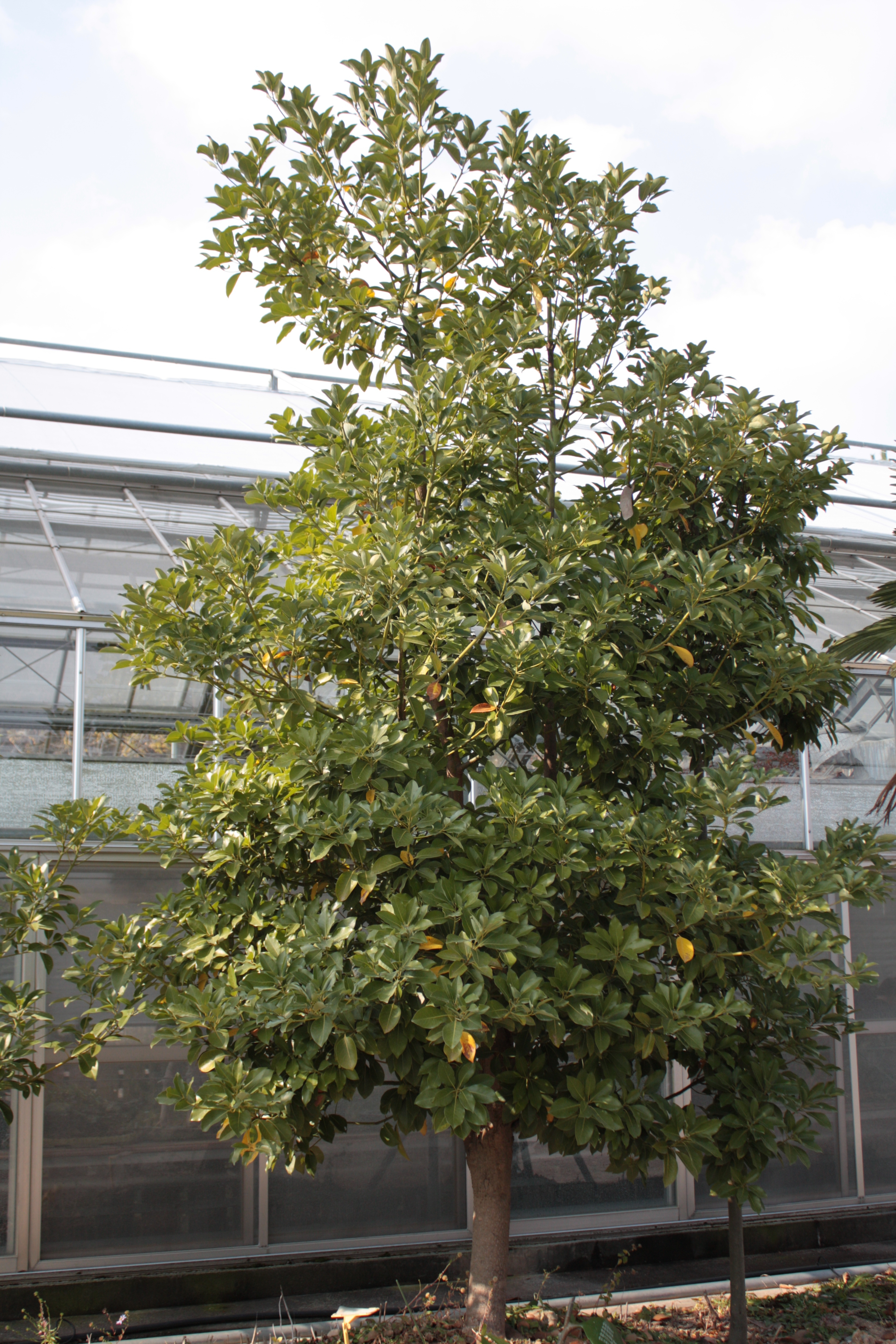
As a street tree in South Korea

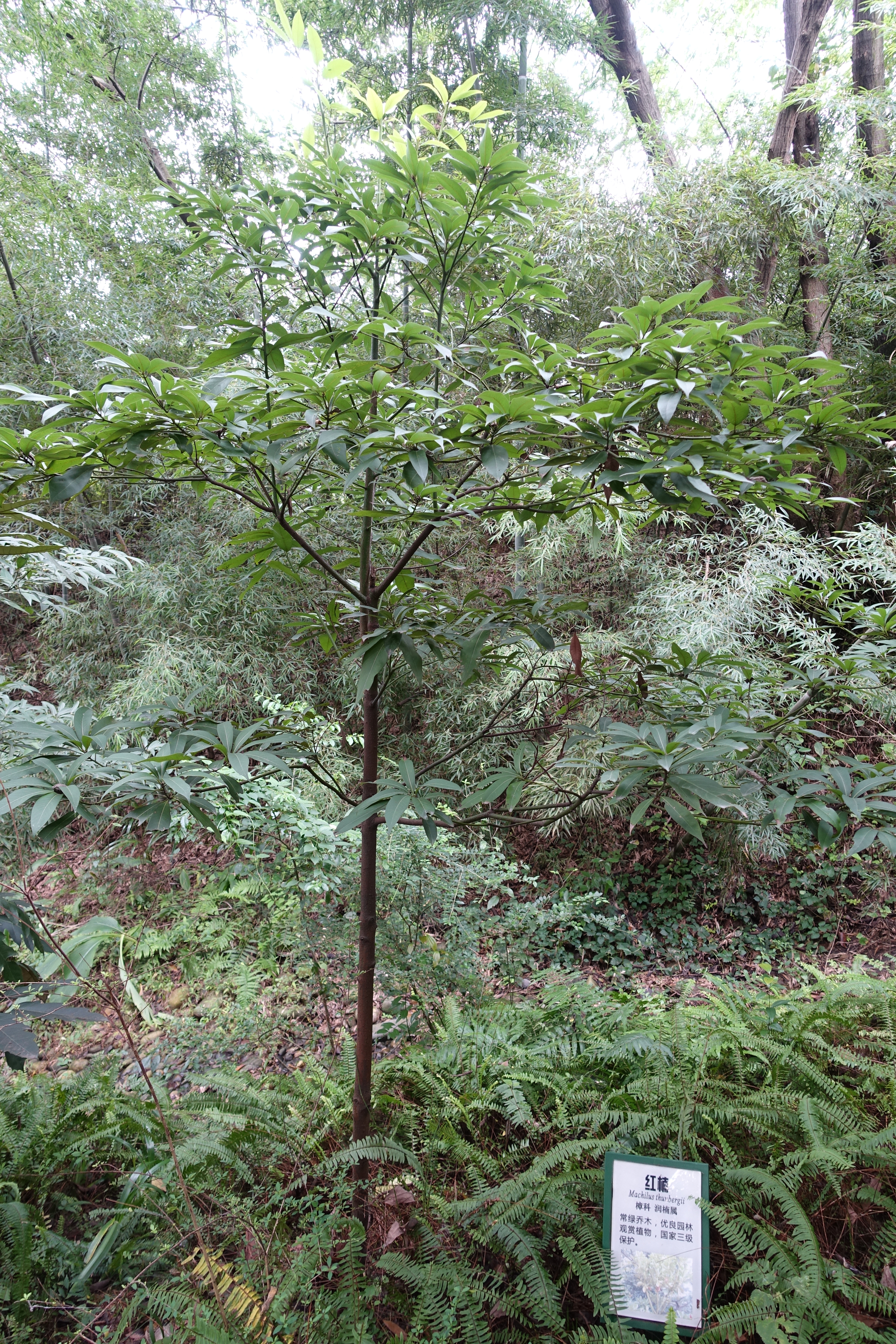
Sapling at the Chengdu Botanical Garden

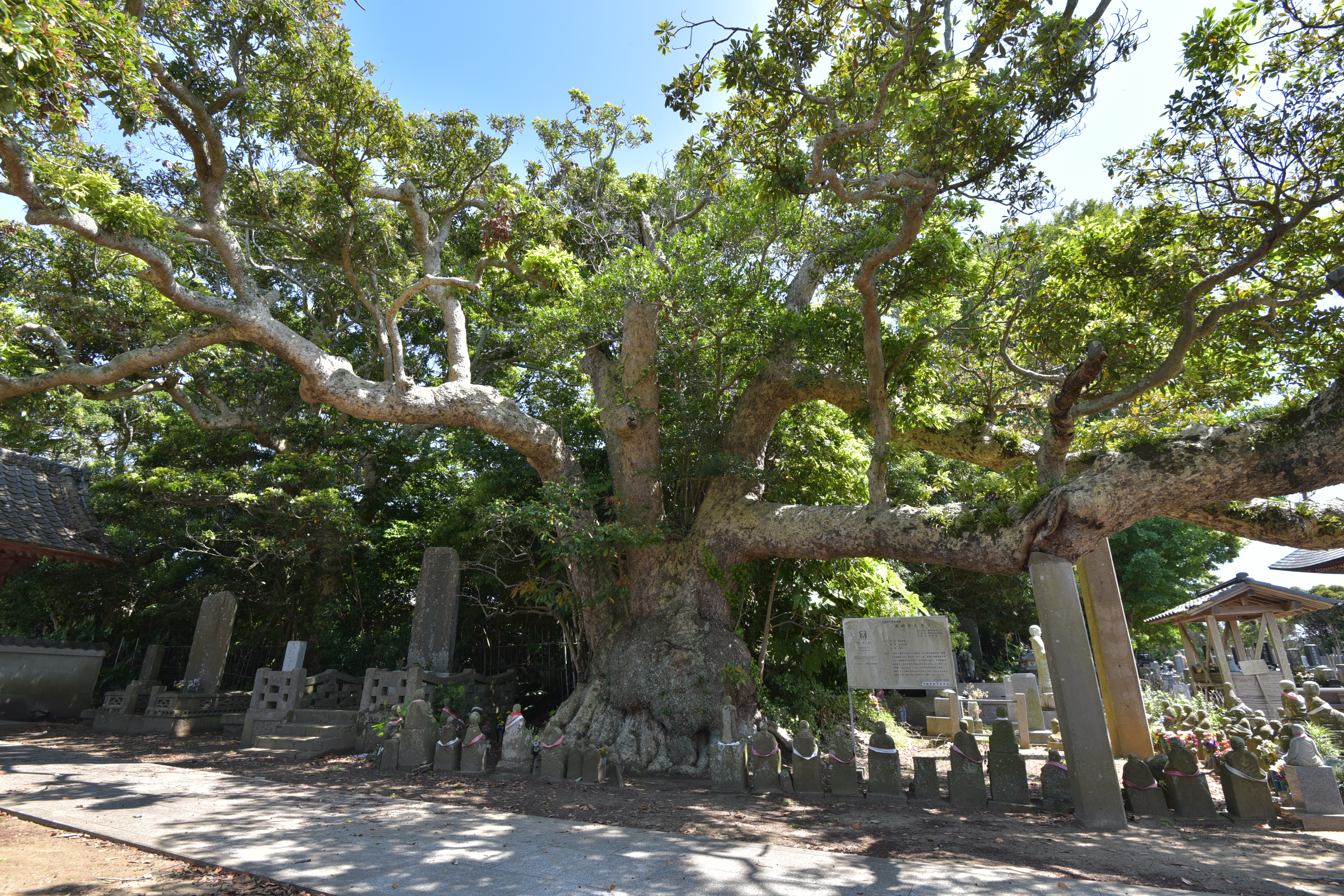
Hasaki no O-tabu

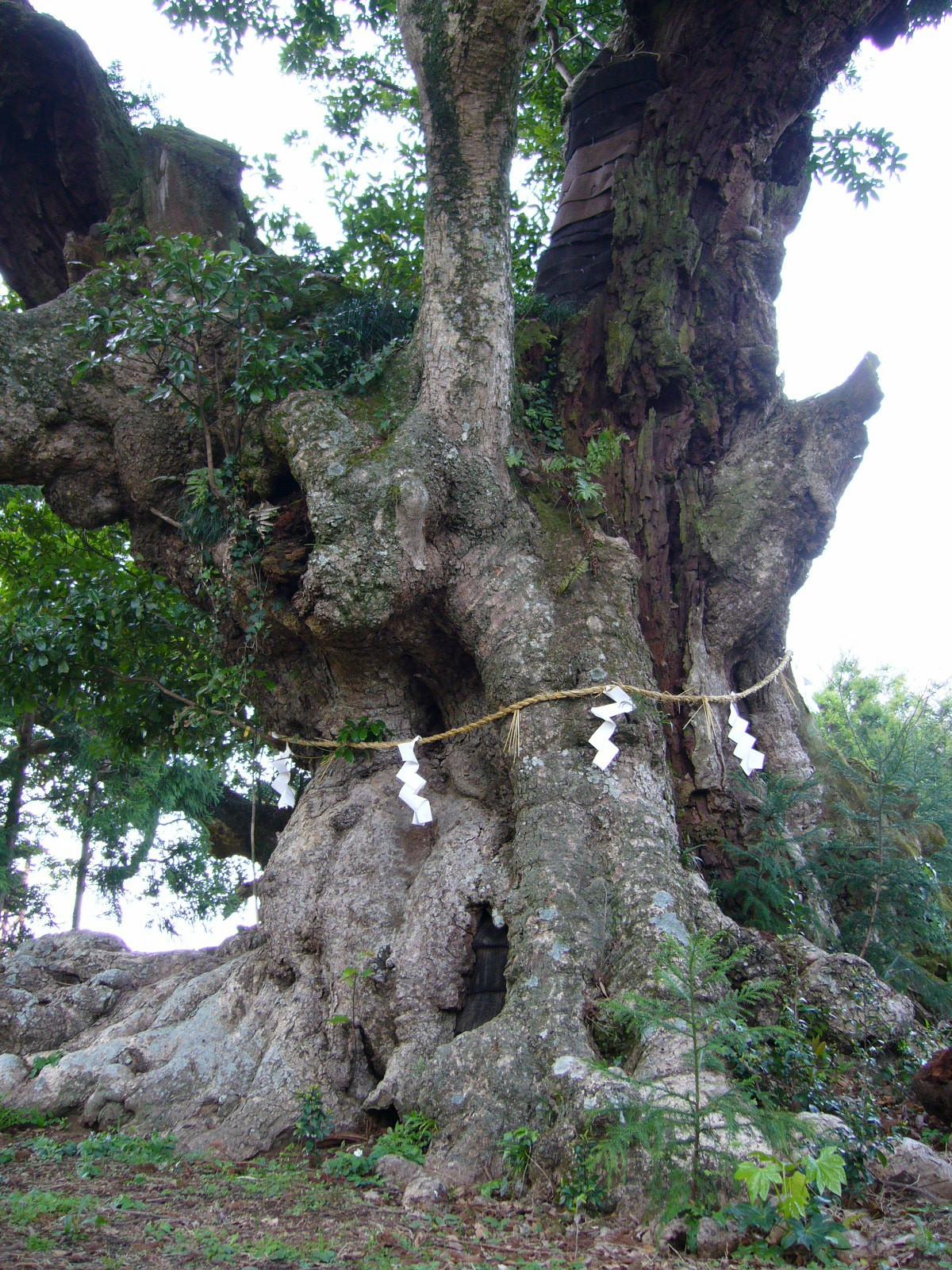
As an object of veneration, Japan
