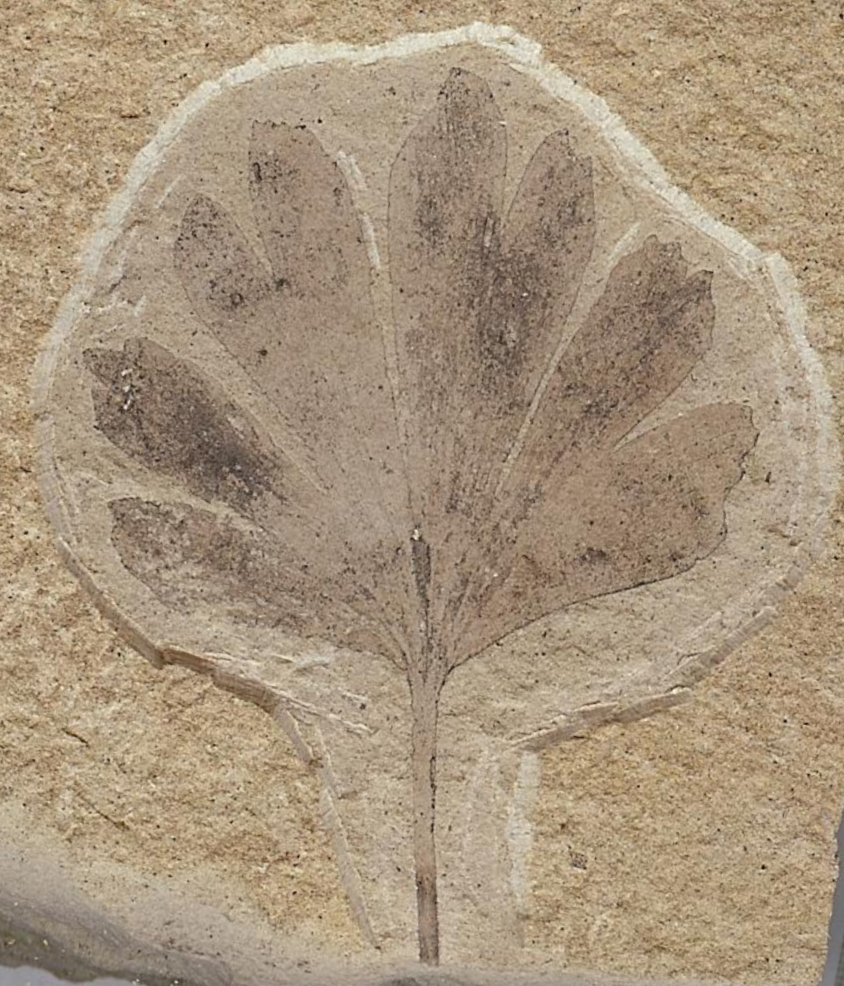
- G. dissecta leaf

Scientific classification
- Kingdom: Plantae
- Clade: Tracheophytes
- Clade: Gymnospermae
- Division: Ginkgophyta
- Class: Ginkgoopsida
- Order: Ginkgoales
- Family: Ginkgoaceae
- Genus: Ginkgo
- Species: †G. dissecta

Binomial name
- †Ginkgo dissecta Mustoe, 2002

= Ginkgo dissecta =

Ginkgo dissecta Temporal range: Early Eocene

Extinct species of tree

Ginkgo dissecta is an extinct ginkgo species in the family Ginkgoaceae described from a series of isolated fossil leaves. The species is known from Early Eocene sediments exposed in the province of British Columbia, Canada, and Washington, US. It is one of two Ginkgo species found in the Eocene Okanagan Highlands sites in Washington and British Columbia.

== History and classification ==
Ginkgo dissecta is represented by a group of fossil specimens from four different geologic formations. The type locality for the species is at the Ypresian McAbee Fossil Beds, near Cache Creek, British Columbia, in the Tranquille Formation belonging to the Kamloops Group. G. dissecta is also known from the similarly aged sites of the Klondike Mountain Formation, which crop out around the town of Republic, Ferry County, Washington. At least one specimen has been recovered from the fossil sites around the town of Princeton, British Columbia, and a fourth occurrence for the species was reported from the "Falkland site" near the town of Falkland, British Columbia, also part of the Tranquille Formation.

The type specimens for G. dissecta include two leaf fossils, a holotype and a paratype, both from the McAbee Fossil Beds. The holotype leaf is numbered number WWU-GK-020 and the paratype is number WWU-GK-008, both of which are currently preserved in the paleobotanical collections of Western Washington University in Bellingham, Washington. In addition to the two type specimens, the Western Washington University collections have 39 other fossils from the McAbee site and one from the Princeton fossil sites. For the species description one fossil, SR 96-09-01, was borrowed from the Stonerose Interpretive Center in Republic, Washington. The specimens were studied by paleobotanist George Mustoe of the Western Washington University Geology Department. Mustoe published his 2002 type description for G. dissecta in the Canadian Journal of Botany. The etymology of the chosen specific name dissecta was not identified by Mustoe in the type description, but he noted it is a formalization of the name which had been first used in 1974 in an unpublished thesis by Verschoor.

== Description ==
Leaf widths of G. dissecta range between 50 and 80 mm (2.0 and 3.1 in) and petioles reaching up to 40 mm (1.6 in) in length. In contrast to the two-lobed structure of modern Ginkgo biloba leaves, the morphology of G. dissecta is four-lobed. These lobes are separated by deep notches which almost reach the leaf base, while additional smaller notches may be present in the upper portions of the lobes. The vein structure of G. dissecta is composed of numerous forking veins which start at the base of the leaf. This forking is different from the vein structure of G. biloba in which all the veins fork from a single vein along the edge of the blade. The overall vein density in G. dissecta is 12–14 veins per centimeter, which is lower than the reported average of 16–17 veins per centimeter in G. biloba. G. dissecta is superficially similar to the older species G. digitata and G. huttonii known from Jurassic fossils. However, both G. digitata and G. huttoni have leaves which are typically divided into six lobes rather than four and both of them have distinct trichomes, hairs, on the underside of the leaves.
