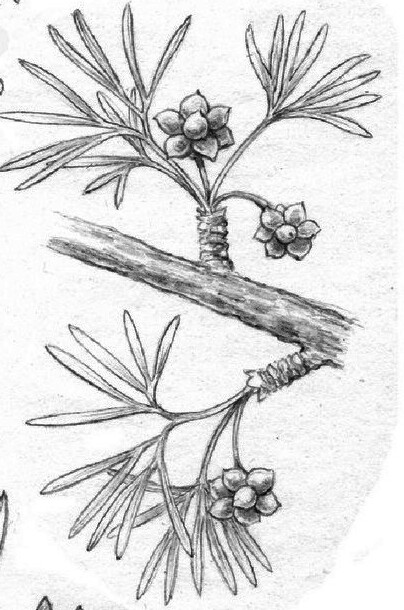
- Restoration of Yimaia recurva from the Jurassic of China

Scientific classification
- Kingdom: Plantae
- Clade: Tracheophytes
- Clade: Gymnospermae
- Division: Ginkgophyta
- Class: Ginkgoopsida
- Order: Ginkgoales
- Family: †Yimaiaceae; Zhou, 1997
- Genus: †Yimaia; Zhou et Zhang, 1988

Species
- Yimaia capituliformis Zhou, Zheng and Zhang, 2006; Yimaia qinghaiensis Wu, Yang and Zhou, 2006; Yimaia recurva (type) Zhou et Zhang, 1988

= Yimaia =

Yimaia Temporal range: Middle Jurassic

Extinct genus of seed-bearing plants

Yimaia is an extinct genus of Ginkgoalean tree, and the only member of the family Yimaiaceae. In botanical form classification, its a form taxon for ginkgoalean ovulate organs. Yimaia species are distinguished from other Ginkgoales by the presence of "Ovulate organs consisting of a peduncle and up to eight or nine terminal, sessile, contiguous and orthotropous (straight, upright and with a micropyle at apex) ovules." The ovules are associated with leaves of either Baiera or Ginkgoites leaf morphospecies. Fossils have been found in Middle Jurassic deposits in China.

== Species ==
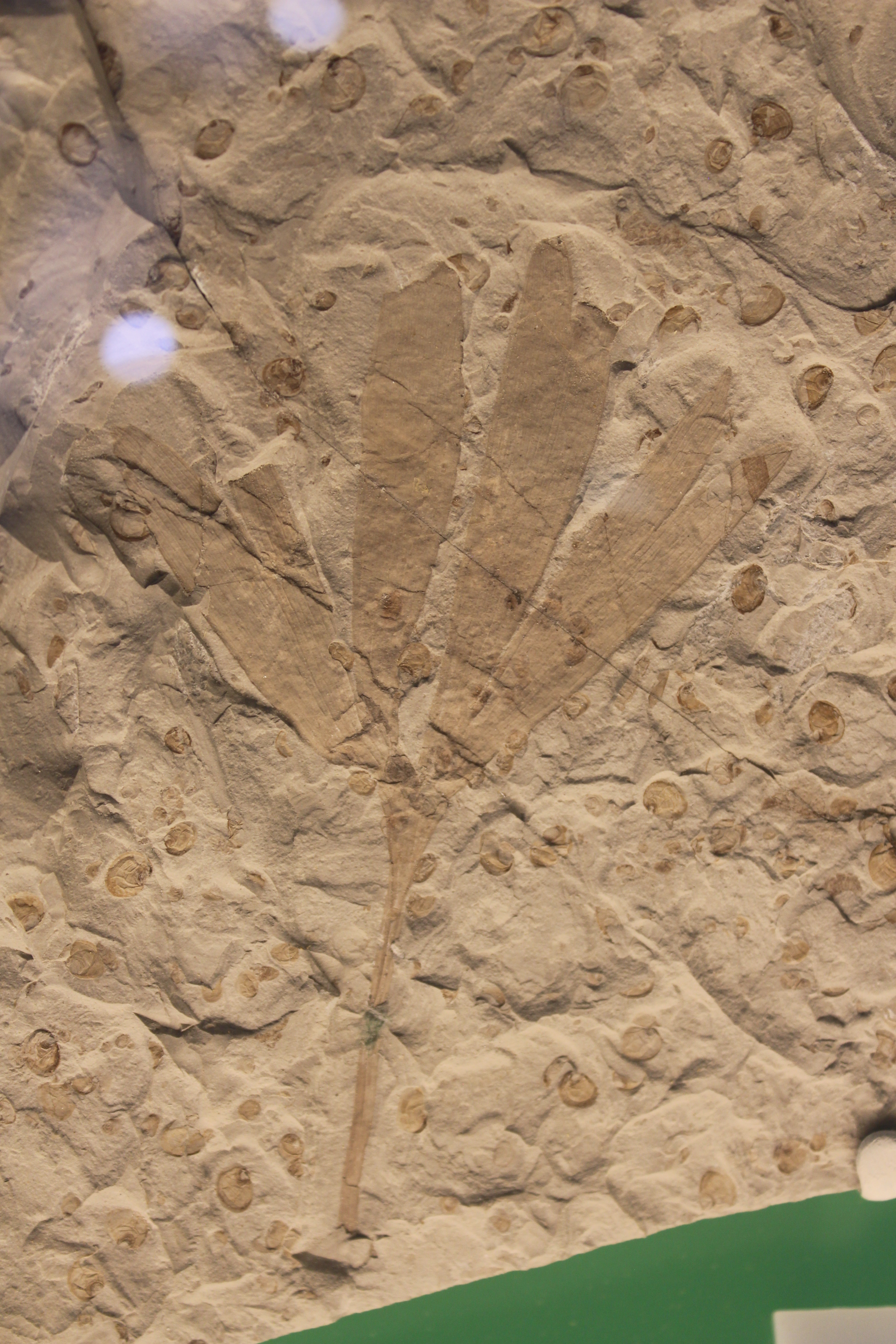
- Ginkgoites-type leaf associated with Yimaia capituliformis
  Yimaia capituliformis Zhou, Zheng and Zhang, 2006 Daohugou Bed, China, Callovian Associated with leaves of Ginkgoites type
- Yimaia qinghaiensis Wu, Yang and Zhou, 2006 Shimengou Formation, Qinghai, China, Middle Jurassic Associated with leaves of Baiera furcata type.
- Yimaia recurva (type) Zhou et Zhang, 1988 Yima Formation, Henan, China, Middle Jurassic
