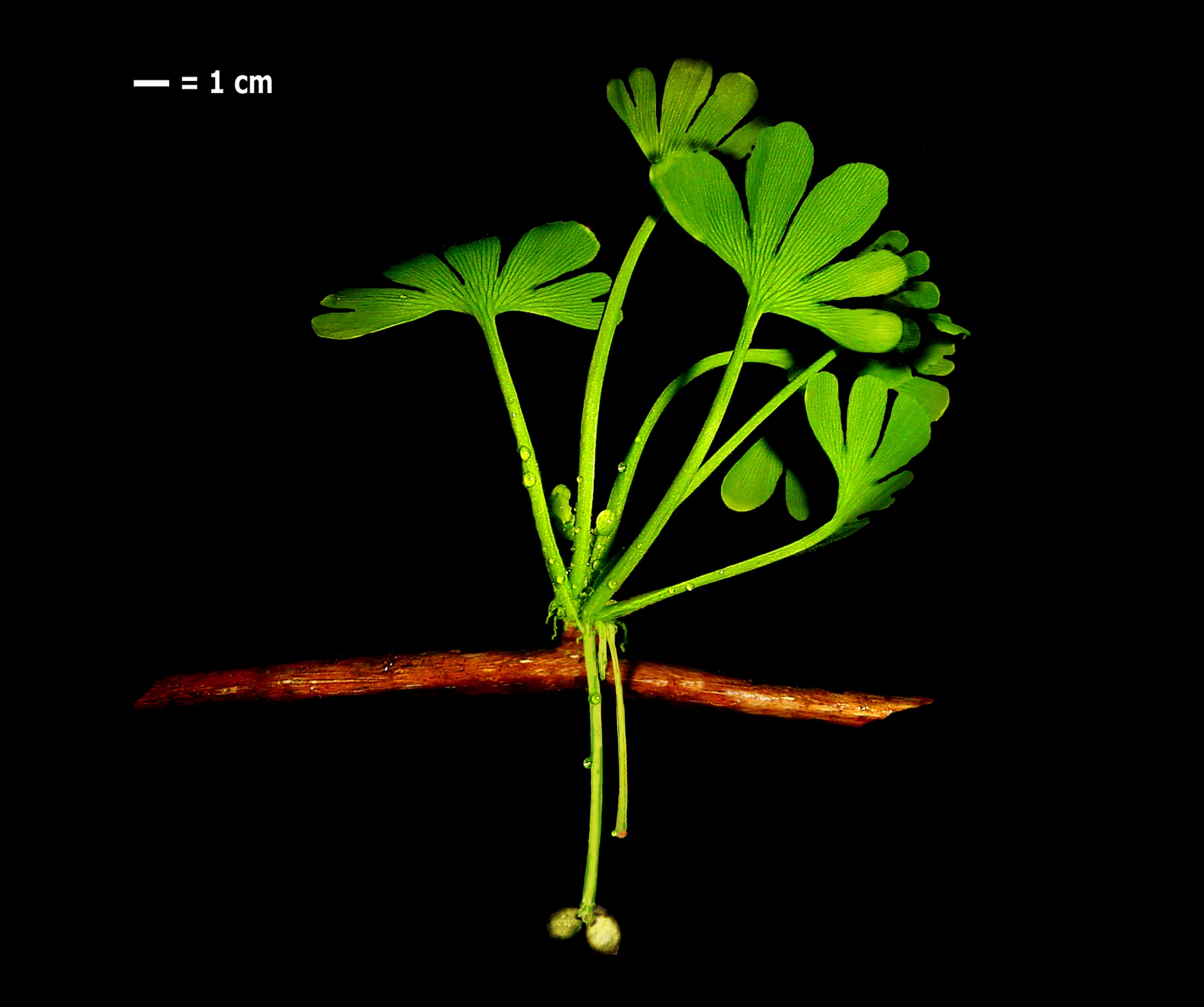
- Reconstruction by B M Begovic

Scientific classification
- Kingdom: Plantae
- Clade: Tracheophytes
- Clade: Gymnospermae
- Division: Ginkgophyta
- Class: Ginkgoopsida
- Order: Ginkgoales
- Family: Ginkgoaceae
- Genus: Ginkgo
- Species: G. apodes

Binomial name
- Ginkgo apodes Zheng & Zhou

= Ginkgo apodes =

Ginkgo apodes Temporal range: 152–145 Ma Late Jurassic (Tithonian)

Species of plant

Ginkgo apodes is an extinct species of plant in the order Ginkgoales. It is known from fossils found in the Yixian Formation dated to the Tithonian period, from the Late Jurassic, located near Mount Yinwoshan, Yixian region, Liaoning Province, China.

The leaves of G. apodes are similar to those that are known in the rest of the representatives of the genus Ginkgo, with a fan-shaped leaf characterized by finger-like lobes.

== Description ==
The ovulate organs of G. apodes bear a cluster of up to 6 ovules that grow out from the apex of the peduncle. These fruits can have 1-3 seeds inside of them. G. apodes has been helpful in understanding Ginkgo evolution because it filled the gap between the Jurassic and Paleocene, and is morphologically between Ginkgo yimaensis and Ginkgo biloba.

== Name ==
The name "Ginkgo" comes from its Japanese name, Gin an and Itsjò, which means "silver apricot". This came from a transliteration made by Engelbert Kaempfer, the first European to see Ginkgo biloba in Japan. The name "apodes" comes from the Greek α- and -ποδ, meaning apod or "without foot", in reference to the very short pedicels in the fruits. (The awkward "–kgo" spelling in "Ginkgo" appears to be an error Kaempfer made in his notes, a more precise romanization would have been "Ginkjo" or "Ginkio").
