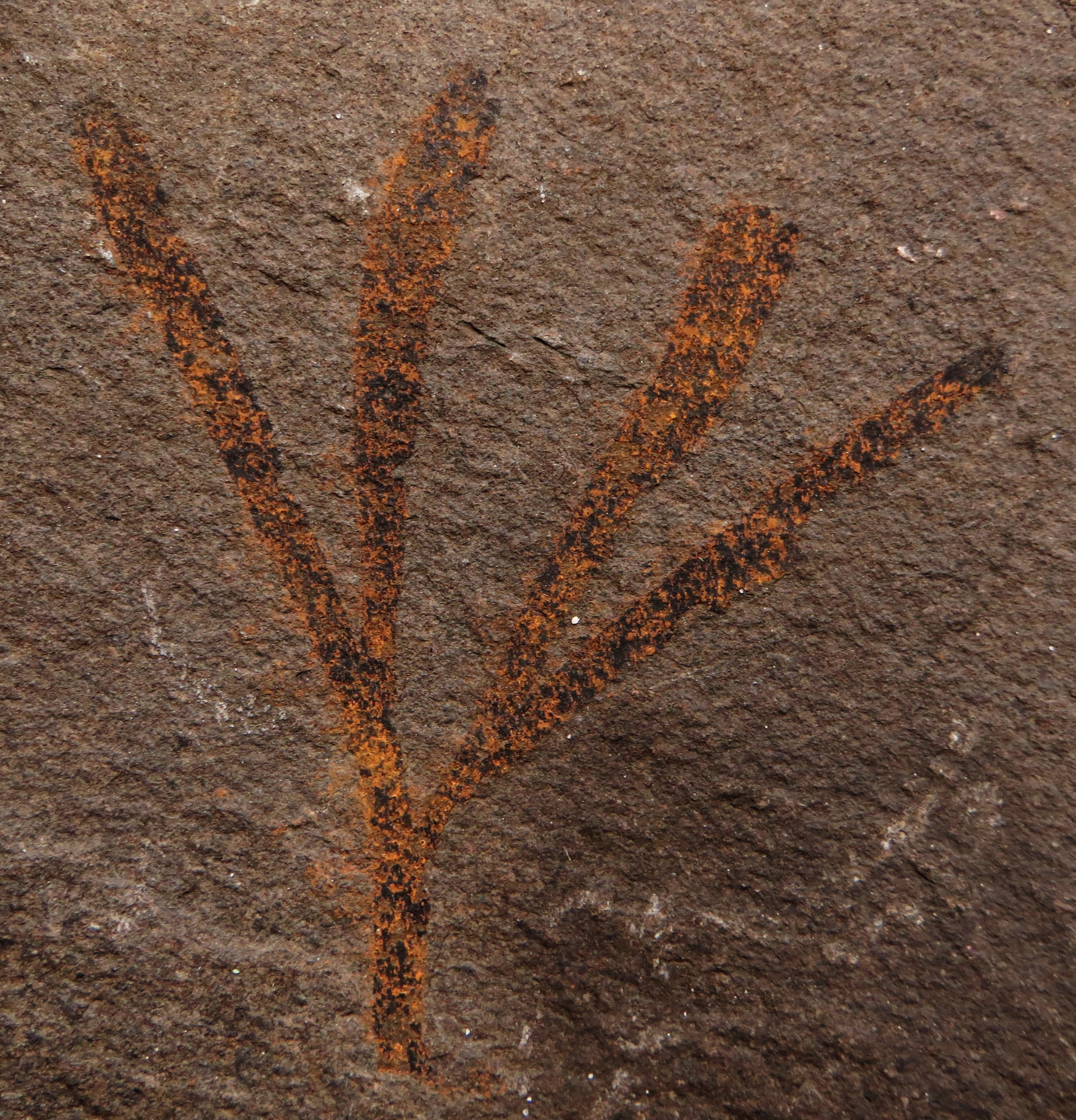
- Sphenobaiera digitata

Scientific classification
- Kingdom: Plantae
- Division: Ginkgophyta
- Class: Ginkgoopsida
- Order: Ginkgoales
- Family: incertae sedis
- Genus: Sphenobaiera Florin emend Harris & Millington

= Sphenobaiera =

Sphenobaiera Temporal range: Early Triassic–Late Cretaceous

Form genus for fossil plant leaves

Sphenobaiera is a form genus for plant leaves belonging to the order Ginkgoales found in rocks from Triassic to Cretaceous periods. The genus Sphenobaiera is used for plants with wedge-shaped leaves that can be distinguished from Ginkgo, Ginkgoites and Baiera by the lack of a petiole. It became extinct about 72.6 million years ago. The family to which this genus belongs has not been conclusively established; an affinity with the Karkeniaceae has been suggested on morphological grounds.

== Locations ==
Sphenobaiera ikorfatensis (Seward) Florin f. papillata Samylina has been found in Lower Cretaceous formations of Western Greenland, the Upper Jurassic of the Asiatic USSR, Upper Triassic, Lower Jurassic in Iran and the basal rock unit of the Lakota formation of the Black Hills, which Fontaine considered to be of Lower Cretaceous age. It is a ginkgophyte.

Sphenobaiera has also been found in the Upper Triassic period Santa Maria Formation of Brazil.
