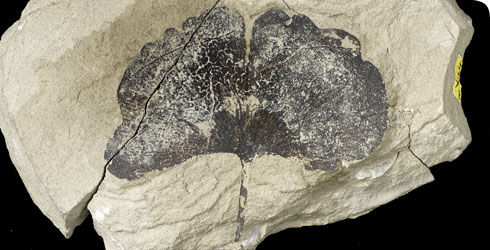
- Ginkgo gardneri fossil in The Natural History Museum, London.

Scientific classification
- Kingdom: Plantae
- Clade: Tracheophytes
- Clade: Gymnospermae
- Division: Ginkgophyta
- Class: Ginkgoopsida
- Order: Ginkgoales
- Family: Ginkgoaceae
- Genus: Ginkgo
- Species: †G. gardneri

Binomial name
- †Ginkgo gardneri Florin (1936)

= Ginkgo gardneri =

Extinct species of tree

Ginkgo gardneri is an extinct ginkgo species in the family Ginkgoaceae from the Paleocene of Ardtun Head, Isle of Mull, Scotland, described in 1936 by Rudolf Florin. This species is very closely related to G. biloba, the only living species of the genus Ginkgo.
