= Cheirophyllum =

Cheirophyllum Temporal range: 299–251 Ma

Scientific classification
- Kingdom: Plantae
- Clade: Tracheophytes
- Clade: Gymnospermae
- Division: Ginkgophyta
- Class: Ginkgoopsida
- Order: Ginkgoales
- Family: Ginkgoaceae
- Genus: †Cheirophyllum

Species
- C. speculare †

Extinct genus of seed-bearing plants

Cheirophyllum is an extinct plant genus that existed during the Permian.

== Location ==
In Brazil, fossils of the species C. speculare were located in the outcrop Morro Papalé in the city of Mariana Pimentel. Fossils of the genus have been found in the geopark Paleorrota in the Itararé Subgroup, and date to the Sakmarian age of the Permian period.
