= Ginkgo ginkgoidea =

Ginkgo ginkgoidea Temporal range: Bajocian, 170–168 Ma

Scientific classification
- Kingdom: Plantae
- Clade: Embryophytes
- Clade: Tracheophytes
- Clade: Spermatophytes
- Clade: Gymnospermae
- Division: Ginkgophyta
- Class: Ginkgoopsida
- Order: Ginkgoales
- Family: Ginkgoaceae
- Genus: Ginkgo
- Species: †G. ginkgoidea

Binomial name
- †Ginkgo ginkgoidea (Tralau) Yang, Friis & Zhou, 2008

Extinct species of ginkgo

Ginkgo ginkgoidea is an extinct ginkgo species in the family Ginkgoaceae from the Bajocian of southern Sweden.

== Discovery and naming ==
The species was originally described by Swedish paleontologist Hans Tralau in 1966 under the name Allicospermum ginkgoideum. In 2008, researchers Yang Xiao-Ju, Else Marie Friis, and Zhou Zhi-Yan performed a taxonomic revision, officially reclassifying it into the genus Ginkgo based on newly recovered, well-preserved material.

Fossil specimens were recovered from the Mariedal Formation in Eriksdal, located in Scania, Southern Sweden. This discovery represents the first well-preserved fossil record of Jurassic Ginkgo ovulate (female reproductive) organs found in Europe.

== Description ==
The female reproductive structures (ovulate organs) of G. ginkgoidea feature a main stalk (peduncle) that branches into two or three smaller stalks (pedicels). Each pedicel bears a single, sessile ovule nestled within a cup-shaped collar. The seeds are ovate with a broad base, tapering into a distinct, pointed apex.

Microscopic structural analysis of the fossilized cuticle strongly associates these ovulate organs with fossilized leaves classified as Ginkgoites regnellii, which were collected from the same stratigraphic layer.

== Evolutionary significance ==
While the modern Ginkgo biloba is a living fossil and the sole survivor of its phylum, Jurassic species like G. ginkgoidea demonstrate that the family Ginkgoaceae was highly diverse, structurally varied, and geographically widespread across the Northern Hemisphere during the Middle Jurassic.
