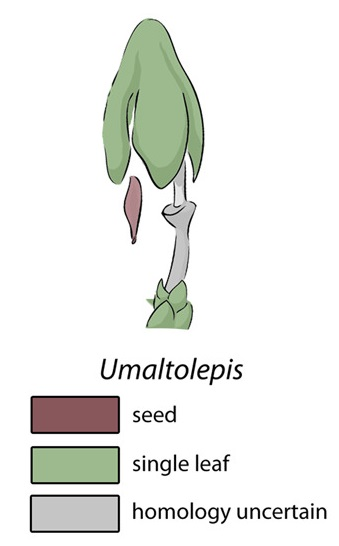
- Diagram of a ripe Umaltolepis, showing the homologies of the various parts of the structure

Scientific classification
- Kingdom: Plantae
- Clade: Tracheophytes
- Clade: Gymnospermae
- Division: Ginkgophyta
- Class: Ginkgoopsida
- Family: †Umaltolepidaceae; Zhou
- Genus: †Umaltolepis (Krassilov) Herrera, Shi, Ichinnorov, Takahashi, Bugdaeva, Herendeen, et Crane emend.

Type species
- †Umaltolepis vachrameevii Krassilov

Species
- See text

= Umaltolepis =

Umaltolepis Temporal range: Early Jurassic–Early Cretaceous

Extinct genus of plants

Umaltolepis is an extinct genus of seed plant, known from the Early Jurassic to Early Cretaceous of Asia. Within the form classification system used within paleobotany, it refers to the seed-bearing reproductive structures, which grew on woody plants with strap-shaped Ginkgo-like leaves assigned to the genus Pseudotorellia.

== Description ==
Umaltolepis consisted of a thick, resinous umbrella-like four-lobed cupule borne on a stalk-like column, which was attached to the tip of a short shoot. The cupule is typically up to 2 centimetres (0.79 in) in length, and up to 1 centimetre (0.39 in) in width. The four lobes enclosed the column down to a flange-like flared structure. Near the top of the column near to the attachment of the cupule, the structure became four angled, with each of the four faces bearing a loosely attached winged seed. The Umaltolepis plant was probably wind-pollinated, likely involving a hanging pollination drop. The seeds are thin-walled and were probably wind-dispersed, with the cupule likely serving to protect the fragile seeds during their development. The cupule split open to release the seeds when ripe. The Pseudotorellia leaves are strap-shaped and somewhat resemble to those of Ginkgo, bearing a number (typically 4 to 8) of parallel veins, and are generally a few mm wide at their widest, and several centimetres long. The Pseudotorellia leaves were borne on clusters at the apex of short shoots. These shoots were typically covered in bark bearing bud scales and abscission scars, arranged in a whorl-like pattern.

== Ecology ==
The Umaltolepis-Pseudotorellia plant is known to have grown in peat swamps, as well as fluvio-lacustrine environments.

== Taxonomy ==
Umaltolepis was first proposed by Krassilov in 1970, but was not properly described until 1972. It was assigned to its own family, Umaltolepidaceae by Zhou in 1991 (often misspelled Umaltolepidiaceae)

Umaltolepis is probably closely related to the seed-bearing structure Vladimaria from the Middle Jurassic of Russia, though its relationship to other seed plants is uncertain. The structure of Umaltolepis has been noted to be similar to those of some extinct Peltasperms and Umkomasiales, while leaves and the attachment of the leaves to the stem is strongly similar to that of living Ginkgo. It has either been assigned to the order Vladimariales alongside Vladimaria as possible members of Ginkgoopsida, or to Ginkgoales sensu lato.

=== Species ===
- Umaltolepis vachrameevii Krassilov (type) Bureya River Basin, Russia, Late Jurassic (associated with the leaves of Pseudotorellia angustifolia or Pseudotorellia doludenkoae)
- Umaltolepis mongoliensis Herrera, Shi, Ichinnorov, Takahashi, Bugdaeva, Herendeen, et Crane Tevshiin Govi Formation, Mongolia, Early Cretaceous (Aptian-Albian) (associated with the leaves of Pseudotorellia resinosa) Also known from the Huhteeg Formation of Mongolia of equivalent age, where it is associated with Pseudotorellia baganuriana.
- Umaltolepis coleoptera Schweitzer et Kirchner Iran, Early Jurassic
- Umaltolepis hebeiensis China, Early Cretaceous
- Umaltolepis rarinervis Krassilov Bureya River Basin, Russia, Early Cretaceous (Valanginian)
- Umaltolepis zhoui Dong, Shi, Zhang, Wang, et Wang Daohugou Bed, China, Middle Jurassic (associated with the leaves of Pseudotorellia zhoui)
- Umaltolepis sogdianica Nosova Uzbekistan, Middle Jurassic
- Umaltolepis involuta Nosova Uzbekistan, Middle Jurassic
- Umaltolepis irkutensis Nosova South Siberia, Russia, Middle Jurassic (Aalenian-Bajocian) (associated with the leaves of Pseudotorellia irkutensis)
- Umaltolepis yimaensis Dong, Zhou, Zhang, Wang et Shi Yima Formation, China, Middle Jurassic (associated with the leaves of Pseudotorellia yimaensis)
