= Ginkgo huolinhensis =

Ginkgo huolinhensis Temporal range: Lower Cretaceous

Scientific classification
- Kingdom: Plantae
- Clade: Tracheophytes
- Clade: Gymnospermae
- Division: Ginkgophyta
- Class: Ginkgoopsida
- Order: Ginkgoales
- Family: Ginkgoaceae
- Genus: Ginkgo
- Species: †G. huolinhensis

Binomial name
- †Ginkgo huolinhensis Dong & Sun, 2012

Species of extinct seed plant in the family Ginkgoaceae

Ginkgo huolinhensis is an extinct species of seed plant in the family Ginkgoaceae.
