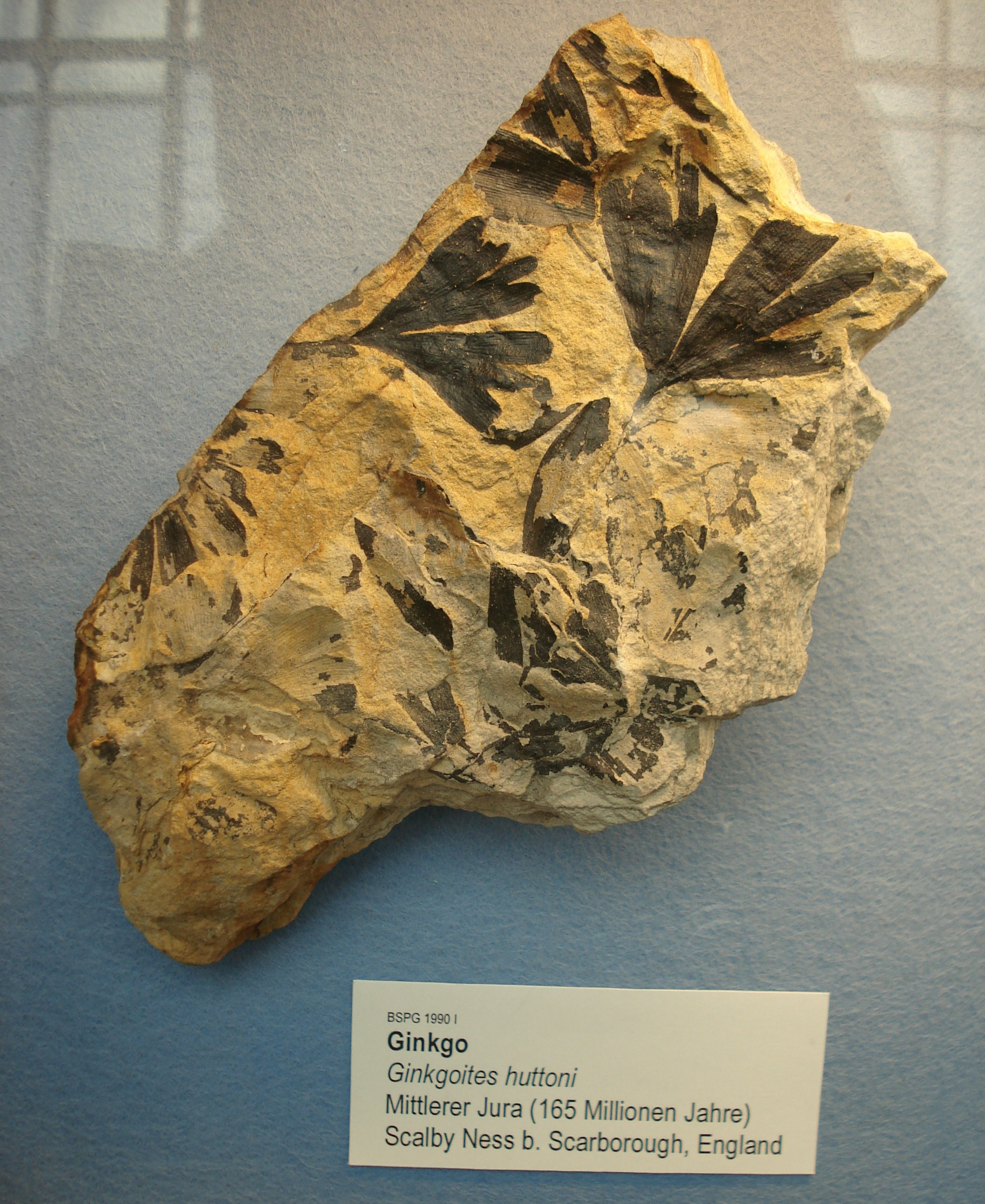

Scientific classification
- Kingdom: Plantae
- Clade: Tracheophytes
- Clade: Gymnospermae
- Division: Ginkgophyta
- Class: Ginkgoopsida
- Order: Ginkgoales
- Family: Ginkgoaceae
- Genus: Ginkgo
- Species: †G. huttonii

Binomial name
- †Ginkgo huttonii (Sternb.) Heer

= Ginkgo huttonii =

Ginkgo huttonii Temporal range: Jurassic

Extinct species of tree

Ginkgo huttonii is an extinct Ginkgo species in the family Ginkgoaceae from the Jurassic of England. The fossil is also known by the name, Ginkgoites huttonii, the genus, Ginkgoites, referring to a group of extinct members of the Ginkgoaceae. G. huttonii was a broad-leaved, deciduous gymnosperm bearing resemblance to the only living member of the Ginkgoaceae, Ginkgo biloba.

== Description ==
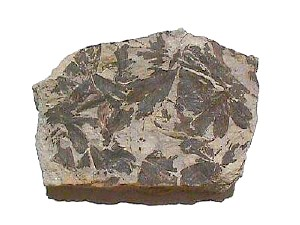
Fossil Ginkgo huttonii leaves from the Jurassic of England

Ginkgo huttonii is known largely by compression fossils of its leaves. Similar to other members of the Ginkgoites, the fossil leaves of G. huttonii are simple, four-lobed, and have dense, radially disposed venation. G. huttonii fossil seeds are frequently found as well as at least a few fossilized male catkins. G. huttonii wood has yet to be described but it is likely the plant was similar to the extant, G. biloba, with wood akin to that of modern-day conifers.

== Distribution ==
G. huttonii is heavily represented in the Jurassic flora of Yorkshire, England - a flora which has been studied in depth since the 1800s. The order Ginkgoales had a wide distribution throughout the northern hemisphere from the Lower Jurassic through the Cretaceous.

== Discovery ==
G. Huttonii was discovered in the 1800s when excavation began throughout the Yorkshire formation. The fossil was first described by Oswald Heer.
