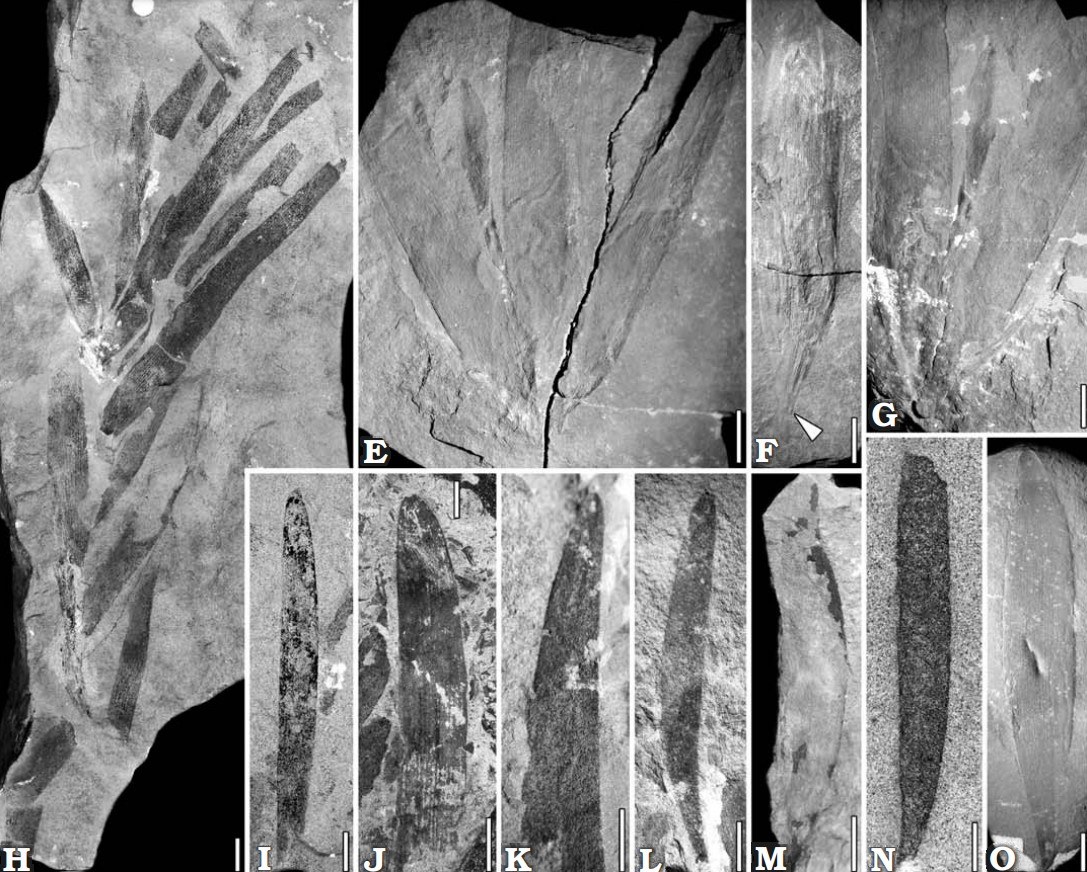
- Remains of Glossophyllum spetsbergensis and Glossophyllum substrictum from the Late Triassic of Svalbard

Scientific classification
- Kingdom: Plantae
- Clade: Tracheophytes
- Clade: Gymnospermae
- Division: Ginkgophyta
- Class: Ginkgoopsida
- Order: Ginkgoales
- Genus: †Glossophyllum; Kräusel, 1943

Type species
- Glossophyllum florinii Kräusel, 1943

Species
- See text

Synonyms
- Arberophyllum Doweld, 2000

= Glossophyllum =

Glossophyllum Temporal range: Early-Late Triassic Induan–Rhaetian

Extinct genus of plants

Glossophyllum is an extinct genus of plants known from fossilized leaves of the Triassic of Eurasia, with affinities to Ginkgoales. The leaves are elongate relative to modern Ginkgo, being lanceolate, strap or tongue shaped.

== Description ==
The leaves of Glossophyllum have parallel veins, and are either lanceolate, tongue, or strap shaped. The cuticle is typically thick and amphistomatic (stomata present on both sides of the leaf). The largest species, Glossophyllum shensiense reached a maximum length of 50 cm and a width of 6 cm.

== Taxonomy ==
Glossophyllum was initially named by Richard Kräusel in 1943 based on the species Glossophyllum florinii, which was described from the Late Triassic (Carnian) of Linz, Austria. It is assigned to the Ginkgoales due to the similarity of the epidermis to members of that order, as well as the characteristic two veins at the leaf base. Glossophyllum was proposed to be replaced by Arberophyllum by Doweld in 2000, due to the previous use of Glossophyllum for bryophytes in the 19th century. However, this proposal not been widely accepted by paleobotanists.

=== Species ===
After Sun et al. 2022

- Glossophyllum angustifolium Stanislavsky, 1976 Donbass Basin, Ukraine, Late Triassic
- Glossophyllum claviforme Mogucheva, 1973 Tungus Basin, Siberia, Russia, Early Triassic
- Glossophyllum ereminae Sixtel, 1962 Madygen Flora, Central Asia, Middle-Late Triassic
- Glossophyllum florinii Kräusel, 1943 (type) Austria, China, Late Triassic
- Glossophyllum lanceolatum Sun et Deng China, Late Triassic
- Glossophyllum oblanceolatum Sixtel, 1962 Madygen Flora, Central Asia, Middle-Late Triassic
- Glossophyllum panii Sun et Deng China, Late Triassic
- Glossophyllum shensiense (Sze) Sun et Deng emend, China, Late Triassic
- Glossophyllum spathulatum Taymyr Peninsula, Russia, Late Triassic
- Glossophyllum spetsbergensis Svalbard, Norway, Late Triassic
- Glossophyllum substrictum Pott Svalbard, Norway, Late Triassic
- Glossophyllum zeilleri Vietnam, China, Late Triassic
