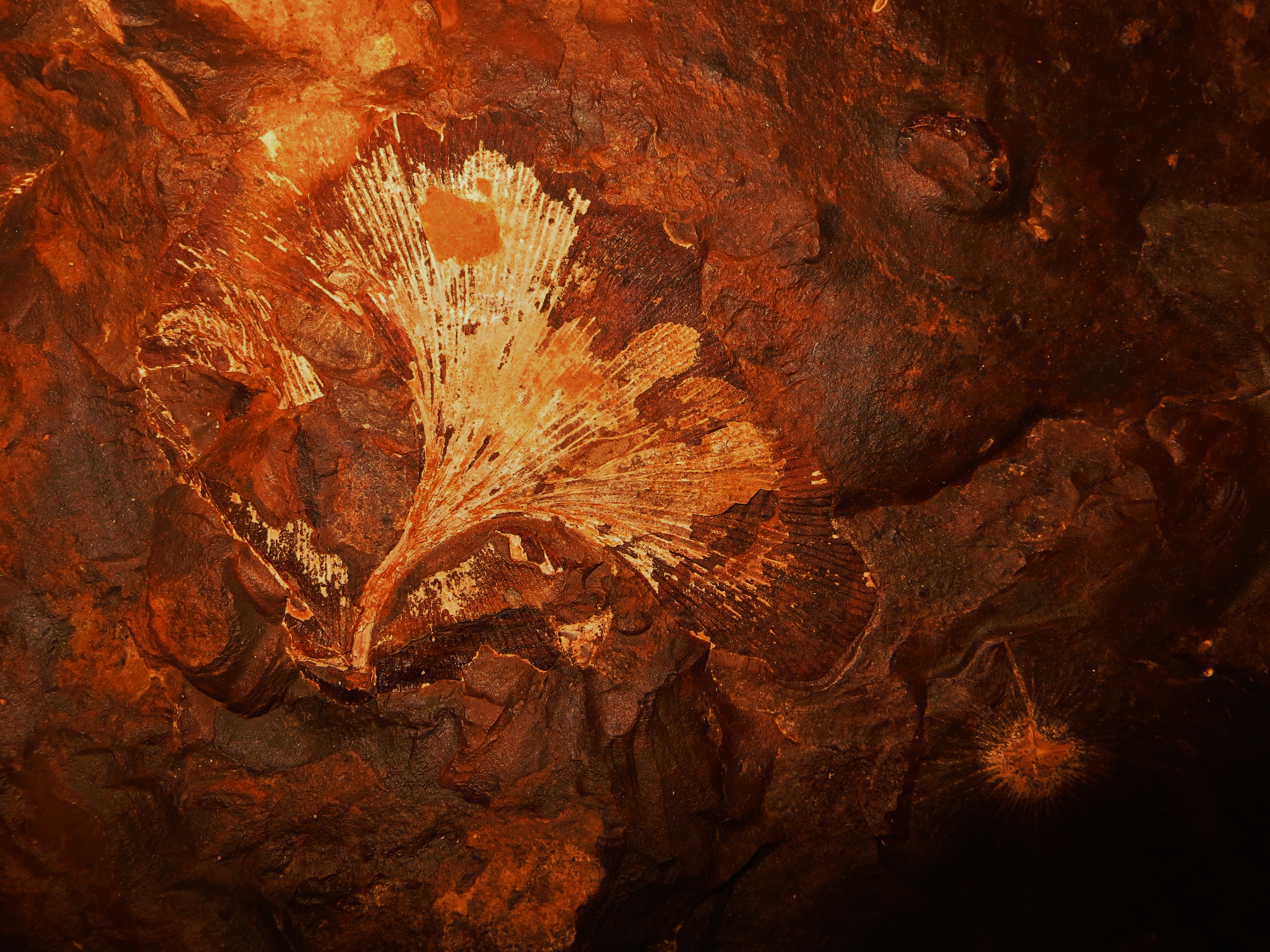

Scientific classification
- Kingdom: Plantae
- Clade: Tracheophytes
- Clade: Gymnospermae
- Division: Ginkgophyta
- Class: Ginkgoopsida
- Order: Ginkgoales
- Family: Ginkgoaceae
- Genus: Ginkgo
- Species: †G. digitata

Binomial name
- †Ginkgo digitata (Brongn.) Heer

= Ginkgo digitata =

Ginkgo digitata Temporal range: Aalenian–Cenomanian

Extinct species of tree

Ginkgo digitata is an extinct ginkgo species in the family Ginkgoaceae. It lived in Great Britain from the Aalenian to the Bathonian, in Queensland in the Callovian and in British Columbia in the Cenomanian.
