= Baieroxylon =

Baieroxylon Temporal range: Triassic–Late Cretaceous

Scientific classification
- Kingdom: Plantae
- Clade: Tracheophytes
- Clade: Gymnospermae
- Division: Ginkgophyta
- Class: Ginkgoopsida
- Order: Ginkgoales
- Family: Ginkgoaceae
- Genus: †Baieroxylon

Species
- B. cicatricum †; B. chilense †; B. schuessleri †

Extinct genus of seed-bearing plants

Baieroxylon is an extinct prehistoric genus of plants belonging to the Ginkgoaceae family during the Triassic, Jurassic, and Cretaceous Periods.

== Fossil record ==
Palaeontological sites producing fossils of Baieroxylon species have been discovered in:

- Neuquén Province, Argentina — from the Huincul Formation and Rayoso Formation, of the Cretaceous period.
- Franconia, Germany — from the Upper−Late Triassic epoch.
- Rio Grande do Sul state, southern Brazil. — from the Santa Maria Formation in Paleorrota Geopark, of the Upper−Late Triassic epoch.
- Chile.
