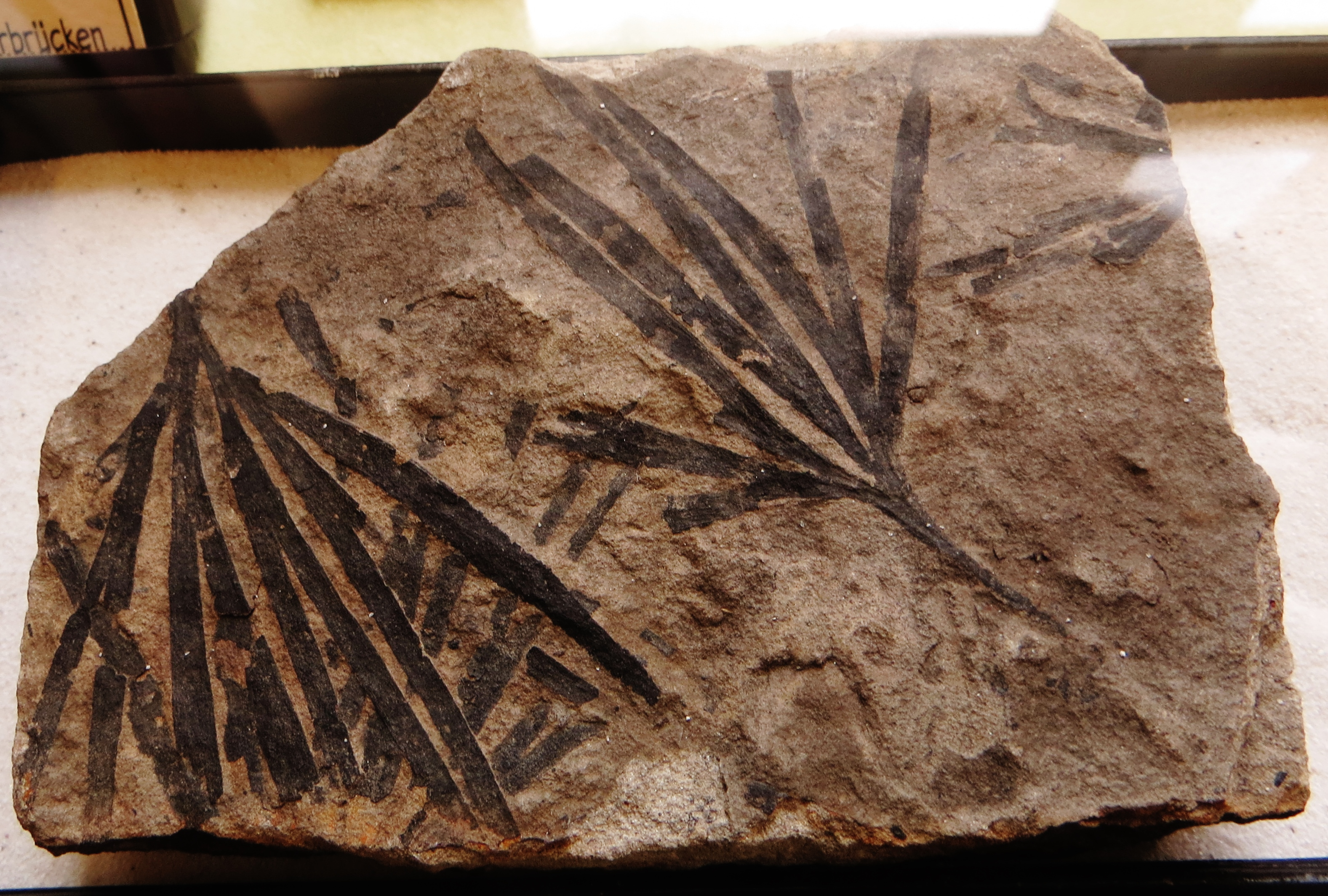
- Baiera gracilis fossil

Scientific classification
- Kingdom: Plantae
- Clade: Tracheophytes
- Clade: Gymnospermae
- Division: Ginkgophyta
- Class: Ginkgoopsida
- Order: Ginkgoales
- Family: Ginkgoaceae
- Genus: †Baiera; Braun, 1843

Species
- †Baiera africana †Baiera bidens †Baiera darleyensis †Baiera digitata †Baiera gracilis †Baiera mansfeldensis †Baiera muensteriana

= Baiera =

Baiera Temporal range: 298.9–94.3 Ma Permian–Cretaceous

Extinct genus of seed plants in the family Ginkgoaceae

Baiera is a genus of prehistoric gymnosperms in the order Ginkgoales. It is one of the oldest fossil foliage types of Ginkgoales, and is related to the genera Ginkgo and Ginkgoites. Fossils of Baiera are found worldwide, and have been known from the Permian to the Cretaceous.

== Description ==
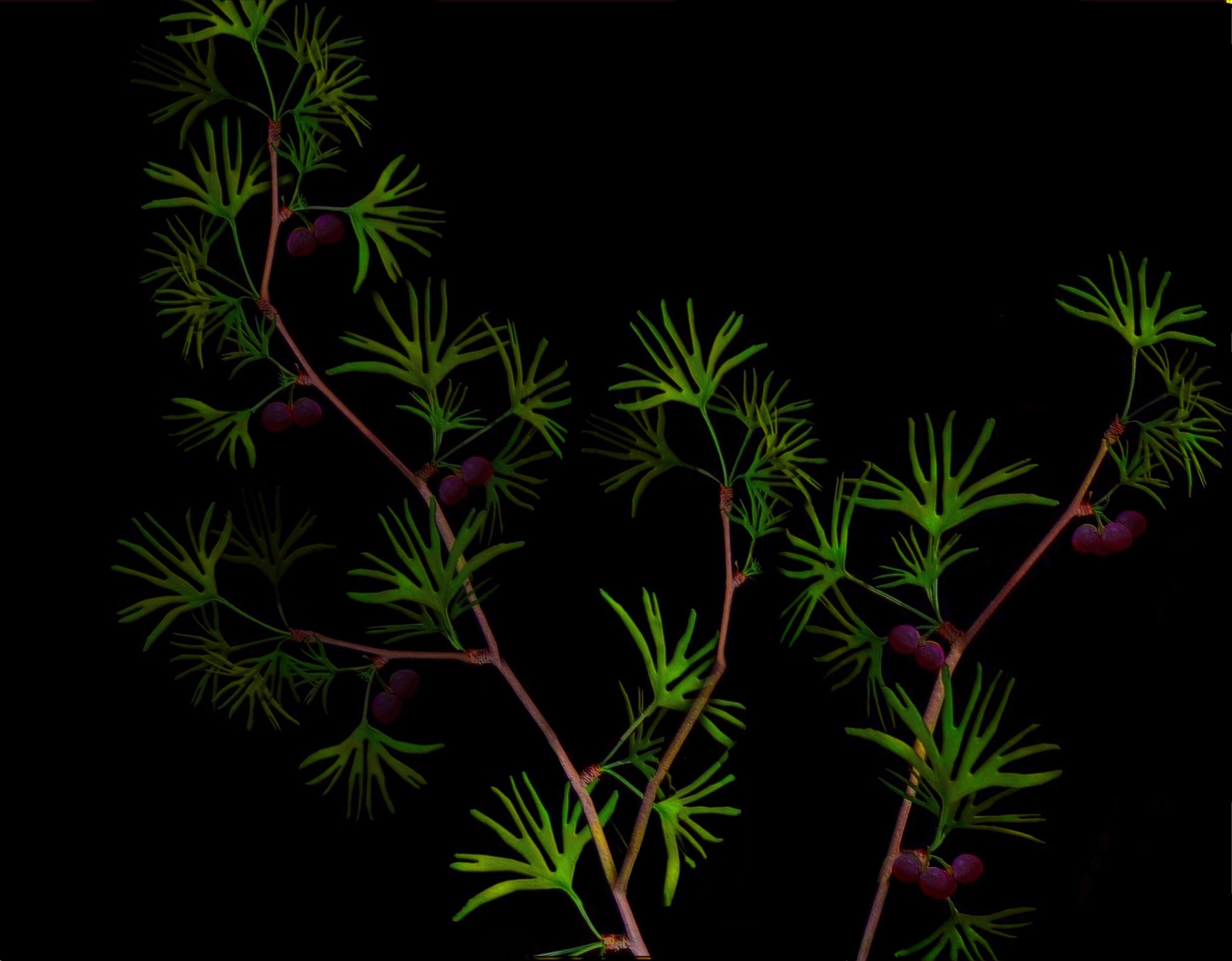
Artist's reconstruction of Baiera.

Baiera species are characterized by fan-shaped leaves, are deeply lobed into four segments, deeply incised into slender segments, and are distinguished from Sphenobaiera by a petiole.

B. africana is characterized by its symmetrical and triangular leaves.

== Classification ==
Karl Friedrich Wilhelm Braun first introduced the name Baiera in 1843 to refer to fossils in Germany that he interpreted as ginkgophytes. In 1936, Carl Rudolf Florin used Baiera to refer to leaves with a distinct stalk or petiole and with a semicircular or triangular shape.

=== Placement of Baiera ===
Gerd Dietl and Günter Schweigert (2011) place Baiera in the family Ginkgoaceae, while a 2015 classification by Andriy Novikoff and Beata Barabasz-Krasny places it in the Karkeniaceae.
