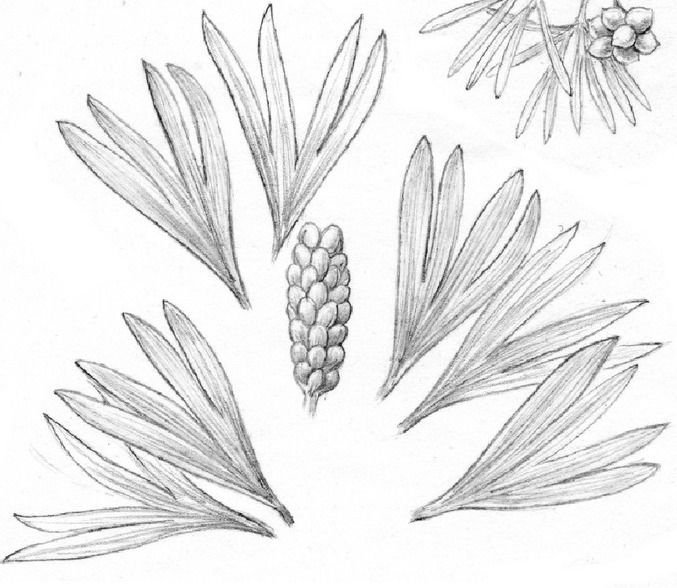
- Leaves and seeds of Karkenia henanensis (centre) with Yimaia recurva (top right)

Scientific classification
- Kingdom: Plantae
- Clade: Tracheophytes
- Clade: Gymnospermae
- Division: Ginkgophyta
- Class: Ginkgoopsida
- Order: Ginkgoales
- Family: †Karkeniaceae; Krassilov, 1972

Genera
- Karkenia Archangelsky, 1965

= Karkeniaceae =

Karkeniaceae Temporal range: Hettangian–Aptian

Extinct family of seed-bearing plants

Karkeniaceae is an extinct family in the order Ginkgoales. It contains the single genus Karkenia. It is distinguished by "Ovulate organs consisting of a peduncle and helically arranged, up to about 100 small, orthotropous but incurved ovules; pedicel present; nucellus largely free." Unlike other ginkgoales, the seeds are borne on cone-like aggregations. Ovuluate organs of Karkenia are associated with leaves of the Ginkgoites, Sphenobaiera and Eretmophyllum types. It is known from the Hettangian to Aptian of both Hemispheres.
