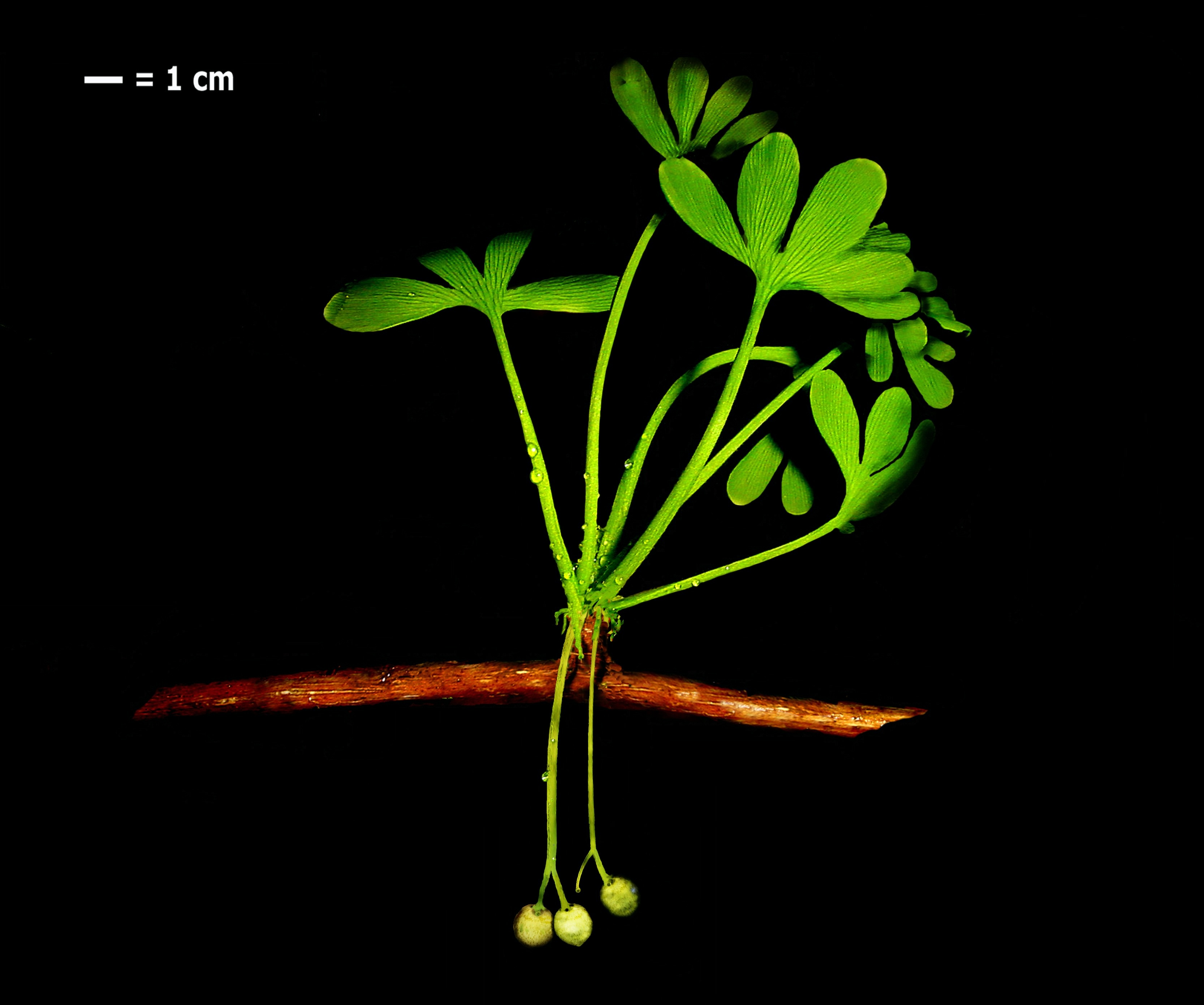
- Artist's reconstruction

Scientific classification
- Kingdom: Plantae
- Clade: Tracheophytes
- Clade: Gymnospermae
- Division: Ginkgophyta
- Class: Ginkgoopsida
- Order: Ginkgoales
- Family: Ginkgoaceae
- Genus: Ginkgo
- Species: †G. yimaensis

Binomial name
- †Ginkgo yimaensis Zhou & Zhang

= Ginkgo yimaensis =

Ginkgo yimaensis Temporal range: Middle Jurassic

Extinct species of tree

Ginkgo yimaensis is an extinct ginkgo species in the family Ginkgoaceae. It is a gymnosperm, first described by Zhou and Zhang.

== Description ==
Ginkgo yimaensis differs from the extant G. biloba only slightly. The leaves were deeply divided, resembling closer the sucker shoots and seedling leaving of G. biloba. The seeds were also borne on individual stocks, unlike G. biloba which forms seeds sessile. The size of the seeds from specimens has ranged from 10-15 mm in length and 8-12 mm in width. G. yimaensis also had pedicels 15-16 mm in length. The megaspore membrane of G. yimaensis and G. biloba are similar. However, it appears G. biloba has developed structurally beyond that of G. yimaensis, possibly by peramorphosis means.

== Distribution ==
Material of Ginkgo yimaensis has been found in the Yima Formation of Henan, China, dating back to the Middle Jurassic.
