= Antagon TheaterAKTion =

German street theater company

Antagon TheaterAKTion is a German theater company, which was founded in 1990 by Bernhard Bub as the “Theater on Wheels” because of its performance on the streets. Antagon TheaterAKTion's objective is to recover the traditional roots of the theater, which have been forgotten.

== Philosophy ==
In Europe, street theatre is more sophisticated each year, due to the implementation of new technologies that allow the creation of better visual effects and pyrotechnics.

Antagon TheaterAKTion uses these new resources to remind people that the hope of creating a better world cannot be found through technology, but through human heart.

For Antagon, theater means the process occurring when a group collaborates on a project.

Antagon TheaterAKtion works with international performers, trying to awake the spectators senses using their voices and bodies, through acrobatics, music, and improvisation.

The production named Ginkgo tries to tell spectators that human being can flourish in adversity. Its plot is about a group of futuristic human beings that fight for their survival and on their way, they discover a force that asserts the power of life. This is based on an event that took place after the atomic bomb was dropped on Hiroshima, a tree named Ginkgo was charred, as well as everything around it, but miraculously it sprouted again. This tree was the inspiration for the artistic director Bernhard Bub for his show.

Antagon TheaterAKTion uses symbols to transmit their ideology about life.
