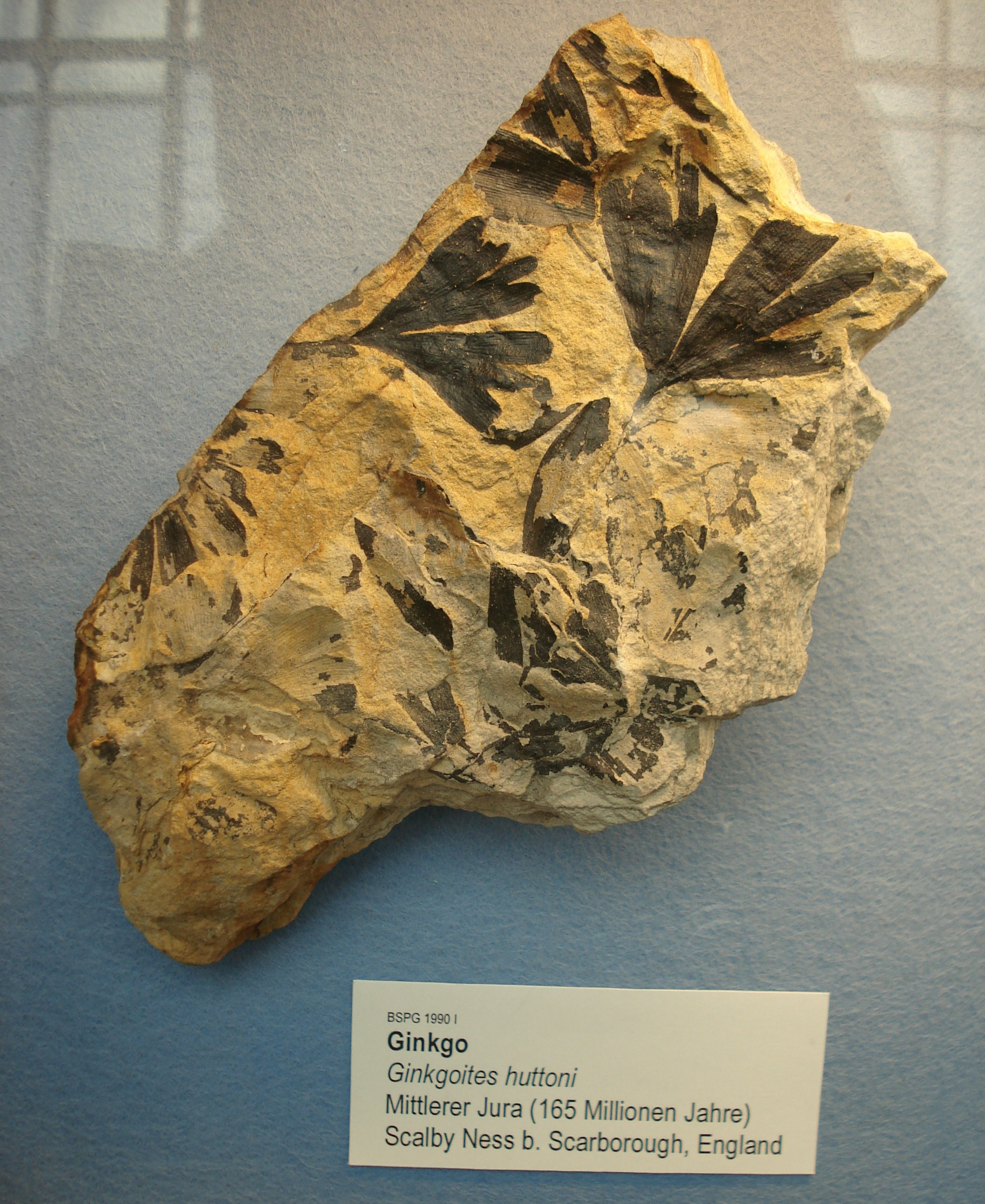
- fossil leaves identified as Gingkoites

Scientific classification
- Kingdom: Plantae
- Clade: Tracheophytes
- Clade: Gymnospermae
- Division: Ginkgophyta
- Class: Ginkgoopsida
- Order: Ginkgoales
- Family: Ginkgoaceae
- Genus: †Ginkgoites; Seward, 1919 emend. Watson et al., 1999

Type species
- Ginkgoites sibirica (Heer) Seward, 1919

Other species
- G. acosmia; G. aganzhenensis; G. antartica; G. australis; G. brauniana; G. cascadensis; G. crassipes; G. eximia; G. feruglioi; G. huttoni; G. myrioneurus; G. obovata; G. obrutschewii; G. patagonica; G. pluripartita; G. tigrensis; G. troedssonii; G. villardeseoanii; G. waarrensis

= Ginkgoites =

Ginkgoites Temporal range: Late Triassic-Late Cretaceous ~225–74.8 Ma

Extinct genus of seed-bearing plants

Ginkgoites is a genus of extinct plants belonging to Ginkgoaceae. Fossils of these plants have been found around the globe during the Triassic, Jurassic, Cretaceous, with fossils also known from the Paleogene. The name was created as a form genus in 1919 by Albert Seward, who stated: "I ... propose to employ the name Ginkgoites for leaves that it is believed belong either to plants generically identical with Ginkgo or to very closely allied types."
