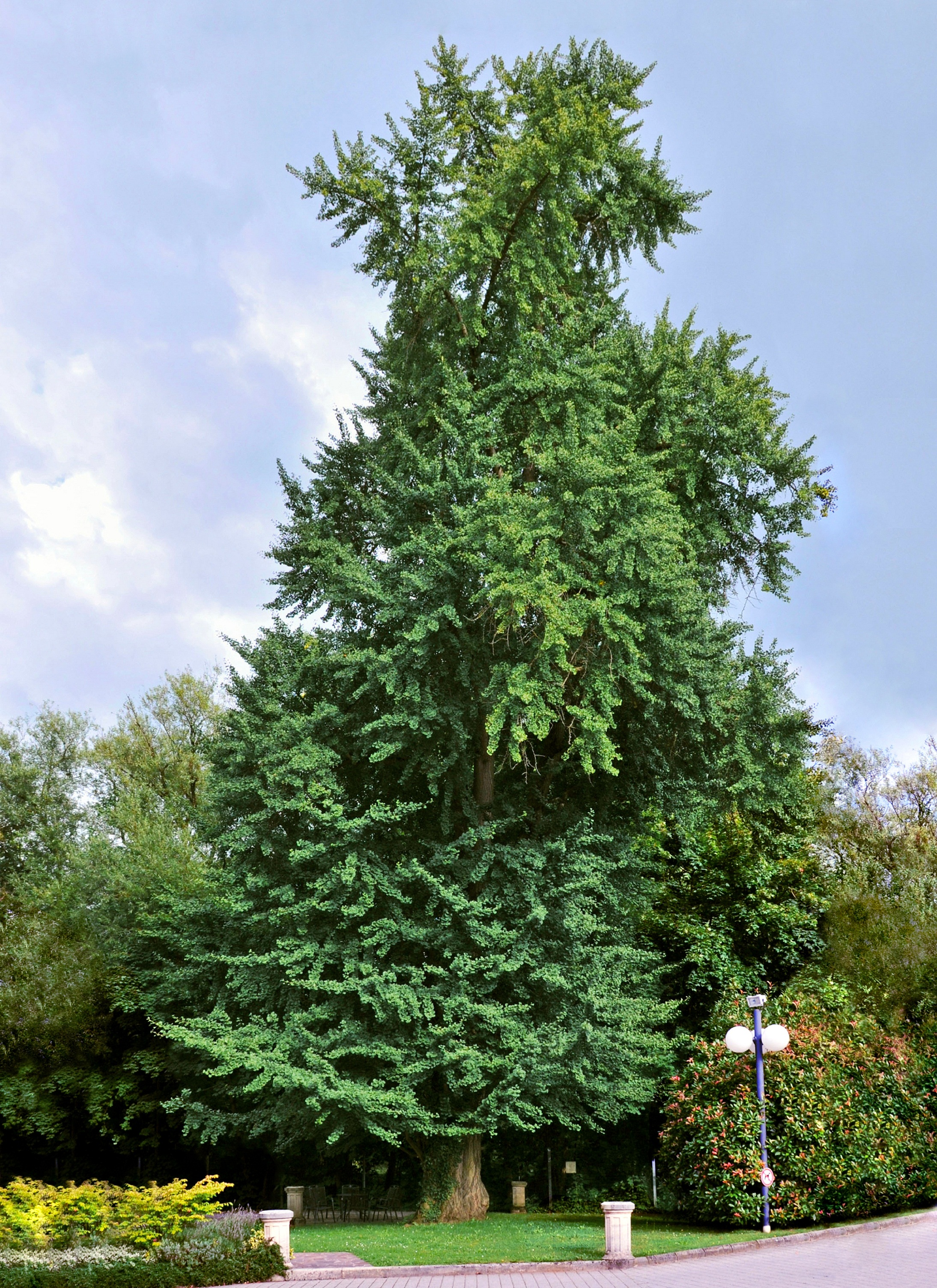
- Habit of mature tree

Scientific classification
- Kingdom: Plantae
- Clade: Tracheophytes
- Clade: Gymnosperms
- Division: Ginkgophyta
- Class: Ginkgoopsida
- Order: Ginkgoales
- Family: Ginkgoaceae
- Genus: Ginkgo; L.

Type species
- Ginkgo biloba

Species
- †Ginkgo adiantoides; †Ginkgo apodes; Ginkgo biloba; †Ginkgo cranei; †Ginkgo digitata; †Ginkgo dissecta; †Ginkgo gardneri; †Ginkgo ginkgoidea; †Ginkgo henanensis; †Ginkgo huolinhensis; †Ginkgo huttonii; †Ginkgo yimaensis

Synonyms
- Salisburia Sm.

= Ginkgo =

Ginkgo Temporal range: Middle Jurassic – Present

Genus of ancient seed plants with a single surviving species

Ginkgo is a genus of non-flowering seed plants, assigned to the gymnosperms. The scientific name is also used as the English common name. The order to which the genus belongs, Ginkgoales, first appeared in the Permian, 270 million years ago, and Ginkgo is now the only living genus within the order. The rate of evolution within the genus has been slow, and almost all its species had become extinct by the end of the Pliocene. The sole surviving species, Ginkgo biloba, is found in the wild only in China, but is cultivated around the world. The relationships between ginkgos and other groups of plants are not fully resolved.

Although commonly used as a traditional medicine or dietary supplement, there is no good clinical evidence that ginkgo has any anti-disease effect or health benefit.

== Evolution ==
=== Fossil history ===
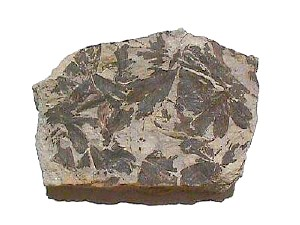
Fossil Ginkgo huttonii leaves from the Jurassic of England

Trichopitys heteromorpha from the earliest Permian period in France is one of the earliest fossils ascribed to the Ginkgophyta. It had multiple-forked non-laminar leaves with cylindrical, thread-like ultimate divisions. Sphenobaiera (early Permian–Cretaceous) had wedge-shaped leaves divided into narrow dichotomously-veined lobes, lacking distinct petioles (leaf stalks). Baiera (Triassic–Jurassic) had similar multiple-lobed leaves but with petioles.

The extant ginkgo (Ginkgo biloba) is a living fossil, with fossils similar to the modern plant dating back to the Permian, 270 million years ago. The ancestor of the genus is estimated to have branched off from other gymnosperms about 325 million years ago, while the last common ancestor of today's only remaining species lived not earlier than 390,000 years ago. The closest living relatives of the clade are the cycads.

The time of this divergence is estimated to be extremely ancient, dating to the early Carboniferous. Fossils attributable to the genus Ginkgo with reproductive organs similar to the modern species first appeared in the Middle Jurassic, and the genus diversified and spread throughout Laurasia during the Jurassic and Early Cretaceous. At the end of the Pliocene, Ginkgo fossils disappeared from the fossil record everywhere except in a small area of central China, where the modern species survived. It is doubtful whether the Northern Hemisphere fossil species of Ginkgo can be reliably distinguished. Given the slow pace of evolution and morphological similarity between members of the genus, there may have been only one or two species existing in the Northern Hemisphere through the entirety of the Cenozoic: present-day G. biloba (including G. adiantoides) and G. gardneri from the Palaeocene of Scotland.

=== Evolutionary ecology ===
At least morphologically, G. gardneri and the Southern Hemisphere species are the only known post-Jurassic taxa that can be unequivocally recognised. The remainder may have been ecotypes or subspecies. The implications would be that G. biloba had occurred over an extremely wide range, had remarkable genetic flexibility and, though evolving genetically, never showed much speciation. While it may seem improbable that a species may exist as a contiguous entity for many millions of years, many of the ginkgo's life-history parameters fit. It displays extreme longevity and a slow reproduction rate. Additionally, in Cenozoic and later times, the ginkgo's distribution is wide and apparently contiguous, although steadily contracting. The fossil record shows extreme ecological conservatism as the niche of the ginkgo is restricted to disturbed streamside environments.

Modern-day Ginkgo biloba grows best in well-watered and well-drained soils, and the very similar fossil Ginkgo favoured similar environments. The sediment records at the majority of fossil Ginkgo localities indicate it grew primarily in disturbed environments along streams and levees. Ginkgo is therefore paradoxical in ecological terms because, while it possesses some favourable traits for living in disturbed environments (such as clonal reproduction), many of its other life-history traits (like slow growth, large seed size, late reproductive maturity) are the opposite of those exhibited by "younger", more-recently emerged plant species that thrive in disturbed settings.

Given the slow rate of evolution of the genus, it is possible that Ginkgo represents a pre-angiosperm strategy for survival in disturbed streamside environments. Ginkgo evolved in an era before angiosperms (flowering plants), when ferns, cycads, and cycadeoids dominated disturbed streamside environments, forming a low, open, shrubby canopy. The large seeds of Ginkgo and its habit of "bolting"—growing to a height of approx. 10 metres (30 feet) before elongating its side branches—may be adaptations to such an environment. Diversity in the genus Ginkgo dropped through the Cretaceous (along with that of ferns, cycads, and cycadeoids) at the same time the flowering plants were on the rise, which supports the notion that flowering plants, with their better adaptations to disturbance, displaced Ginkgo and its associates over time.

=== Phylogeny ===
As of 2013, molecular phylogenetic studies have produced at least six different placements of Ginkgo relative to cycads, conifers, gnetophytes and angiosperms. The two most common are that Ginkgo is a sister to a clade composed of conifers and gnetophytes, and that Ginkgo and cycads form a clade within the gymnosperms. A 2013 study found that the best support was for the monophyly of Ginkgo and cycads:

- Seed plants
  - Angiosperms
    (flowering plants)
  - Gymnosperms
    - - Cycads
      - Ginkgo
    - - - Pinaceae (the pine family)
        - Gnetophytes
      - Cupressophytes (other conifers)

=== Taxonomic history and etymology ===
The German naturalist Engelbert Kaempfer introduced the spelling ginkgo in his 1712 book Amoenitatum Exoticarum, taking it from the Japanese herbalist Tekisai Nakamura's manuscript, Kinmō Zu'i, which he acquired in Dejima between 1689–91. It is thought that he may have misspelled ginkyo or ginkio, which is a Japanese pronunciation for the kanji Japanese: 銀杏, lit. 'silver apricot', as ginkgo.

The original Chinese name, Japanese: 銀杏, appeared in Chinese herbology literature such as the 1329 Daily Use Materia Medica (日用本草) and the 1578 Compendium of Materia Medica (本草綱目). It is a jukujikun (Chinese reading) of another Sinitic term 鴨脚 (Yājiǎo) "duckfeet" in reference to its leaves, attested in 11th century Song dynasty literature.

The genus Ginkgo was formally described and published by Carl Linnaeus in his 1771 book Mantissa plantarum II. He used Kaempfer's misspelling for the name of the genus. Despite its spelling, "ginkgo" is usually pronounced /ˈɡɪŋkoʊ/, which has given rise to the common alternative spelling "gingko". The spelling pronunciation /ˈɡɪŋkɡoʊ/ is also documented in some dictionaries.

The family Ginkgoaceae was first published by the German botanist Adolf Engler in the 1897 book Die natürlichen Pflanzenfamilien which he edited with Karl A. E. Prantl. The family contains only the genus Ginkgo. The name is a nomen conservandum, retained despite breaking rules of botanical nomenclature.

== Human uses ==
=== Herbalism and phytochemicals ===
Having been used in traditional Chinese medicine since at least the 11th century AD, ginkgo seeds, leaves, and nuts have been used for treating various ailments, although there is no clinical evidence that ginkgo is effective as a therapy for any disease or for imparting any health effects. Although commonly used as a dietary supplement, ginkgo products provide no proven benefits.

Ginkgolides – terpenic lactones present in Ginkgo leaves – are diterpenoids with 20-carbon skeletons, biosynthesized from geranylgeranyl pyrophosphate. Ginkgo leaves are rich in diverse phytochemicals, including the flavonoids, quercetin, kaempferol, and isorhamnetin. Containing carbohydrates, protein, and fats, the seeds are coated with butyric acid and caproic acid, which produce a foul odor.

In Korea, ginkgo seed flesh is eaten with rice.

=== Culture ===
The ginkgo has appeared in culture both in East Asia and in the Western world. In Japan, ginkgo designs appear in woodblock prints such as Utamaro's depiction of Ofuji, known as "Miss Ginkgo", and in the chonmage hairstyle used by sumo wrestlers.

In China and Japan

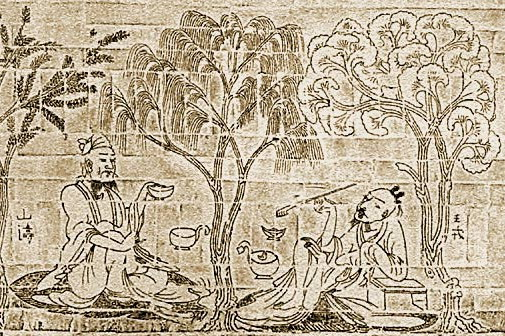
Detail of moulded-brick relief "Seven Sages of the Bamboo Grove and Rong Qiqi", from a tomb near Nanjing, c. 400 AD

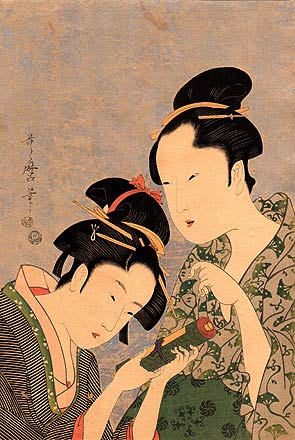
Ofuji, 'Miss Ginkgo', woodblock print by Kitagawa Utamaro, c. 1793–94

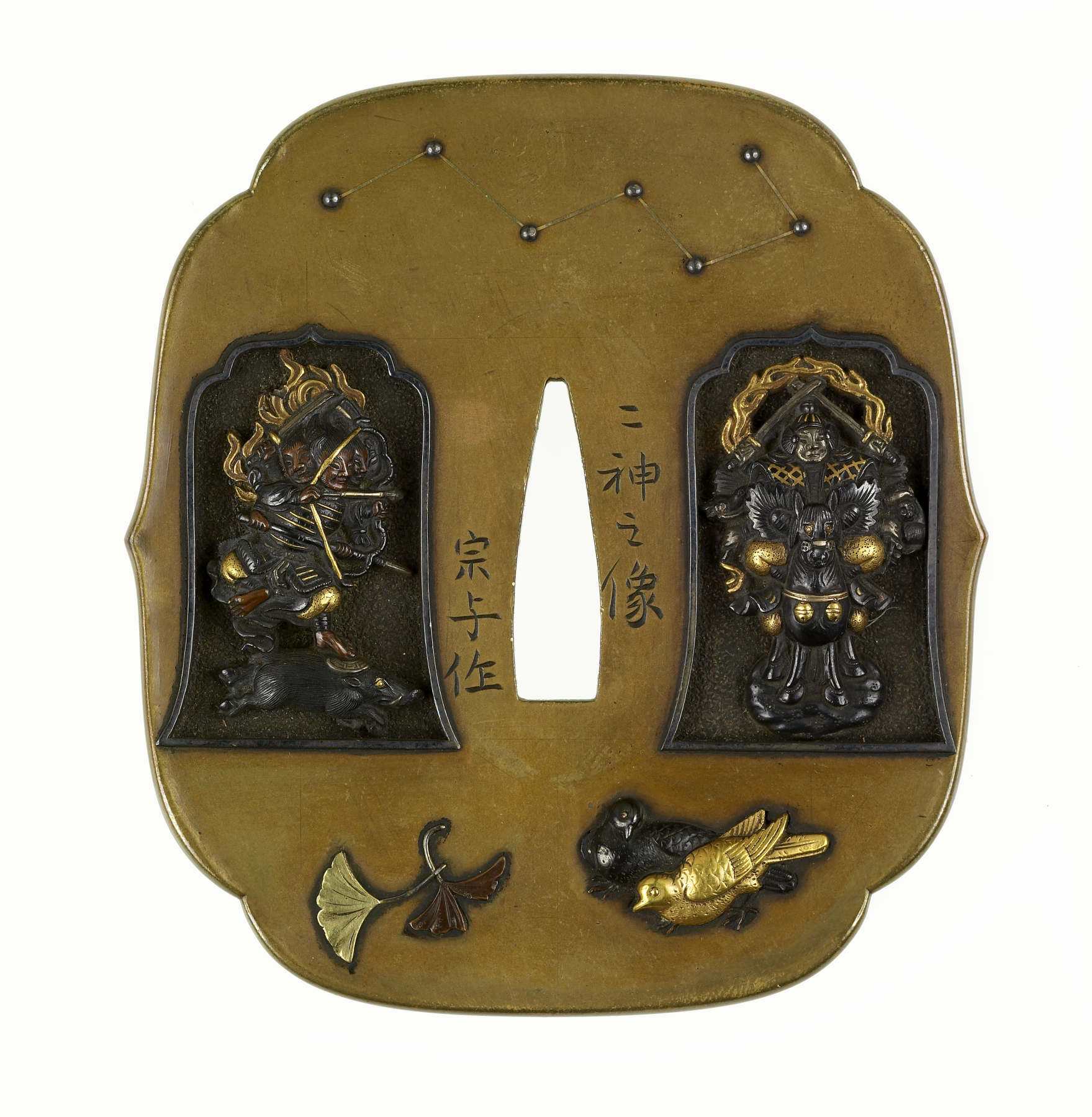
Tsuba sword mounting, Tobari Yoshihisa, c. 1825–1850 AD, Japan

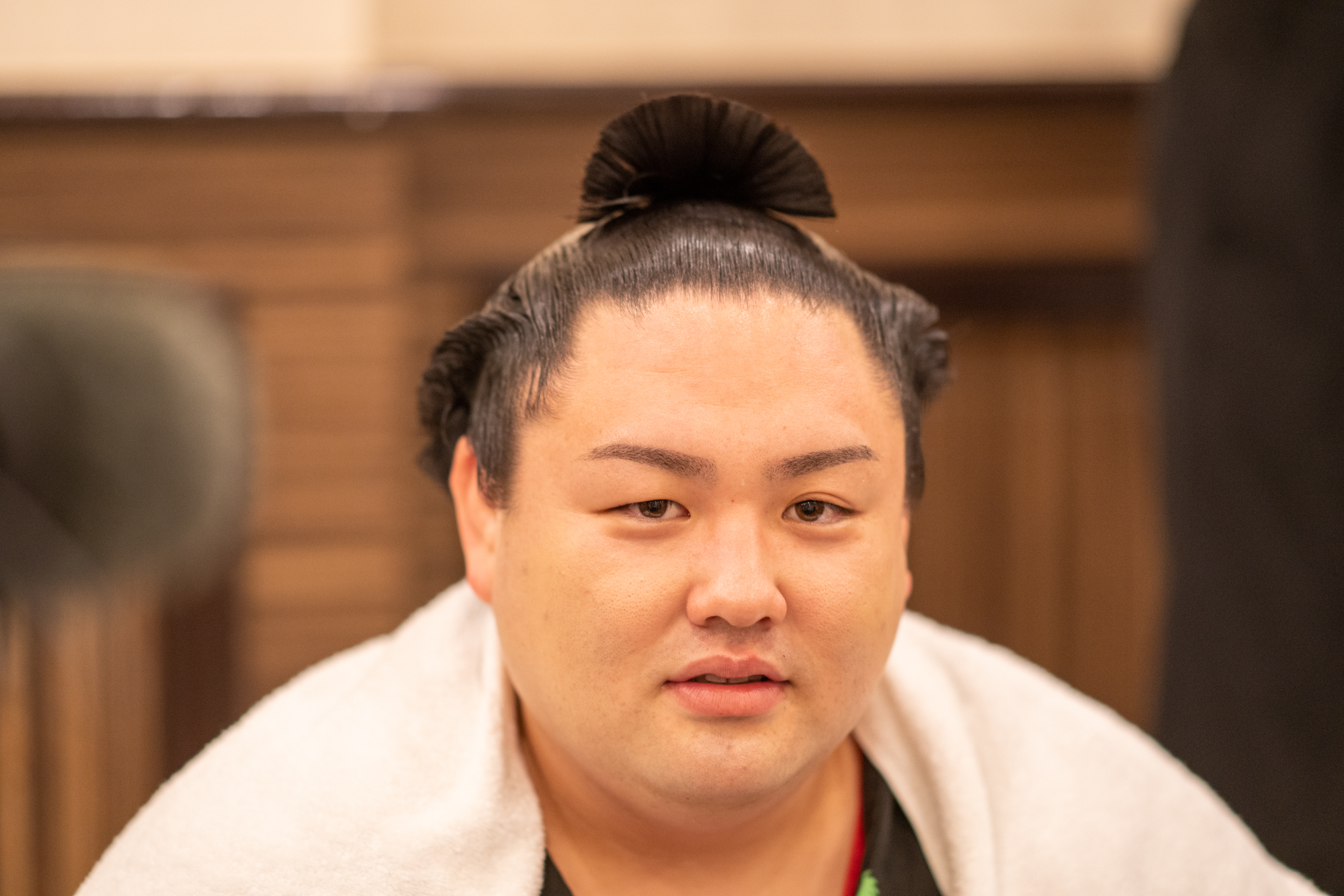
Ginkgo chonmage hairstyle of a sumo wrestler

In the Western world, ginkgo designs appeared in Art Nouveau at the start of the 20th century; it was a distinctive motif used by the École de Nancy in France, with the leaves modelled in stone and in ironwork around the city of Nancy.

In Art Nouveau

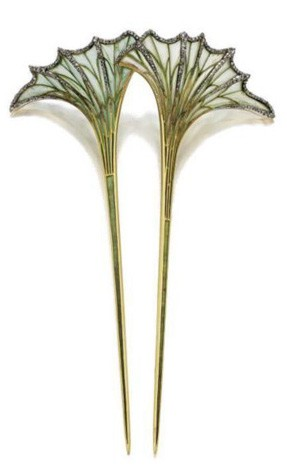
Pair of fan-shaped leaves of green plique-à-jour enamel with small rose-cut diamonds in the veins. Louis Aucoc, c. 1900

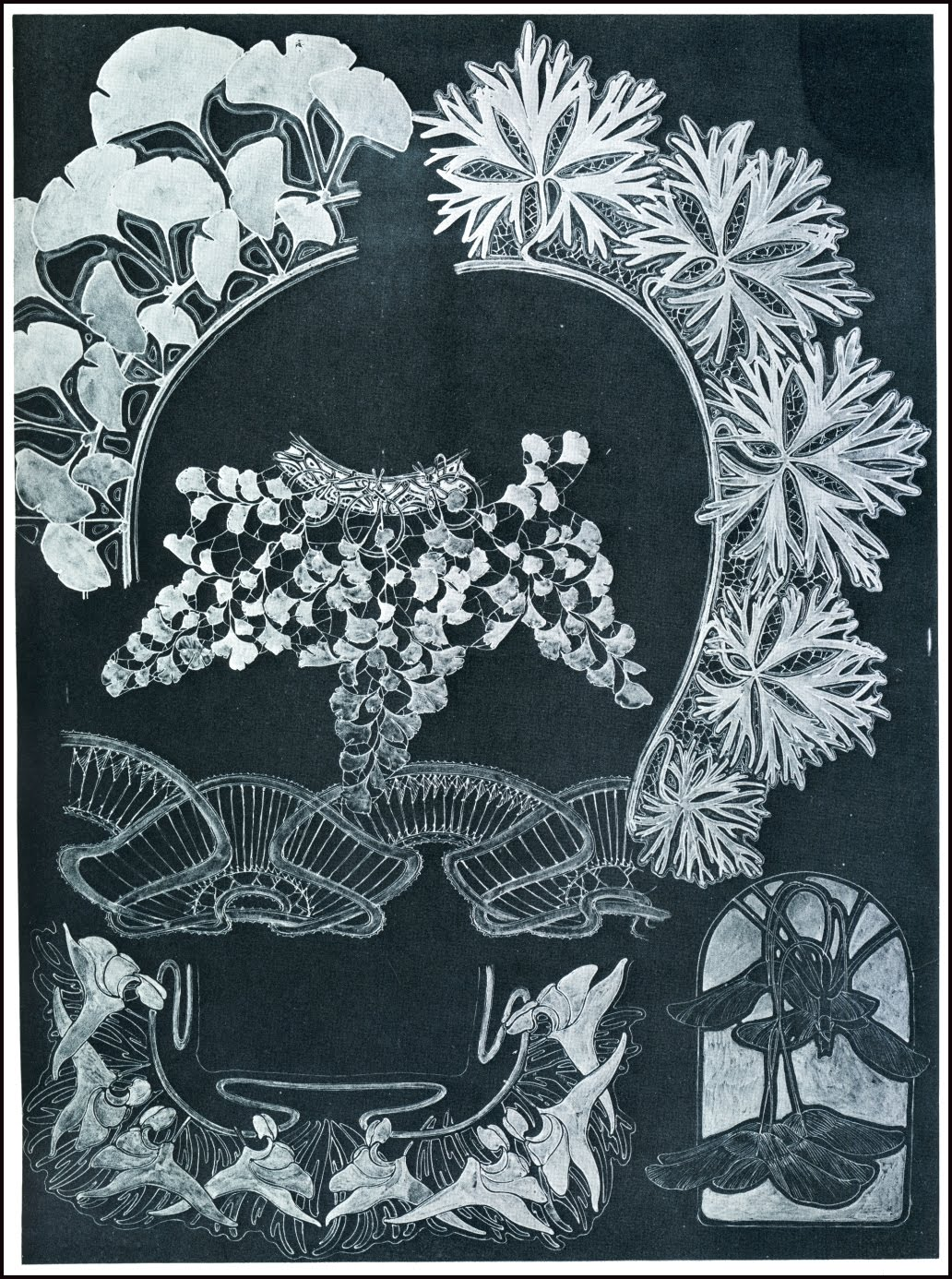
Ginkgo design by Alphonse Mucha, 1901

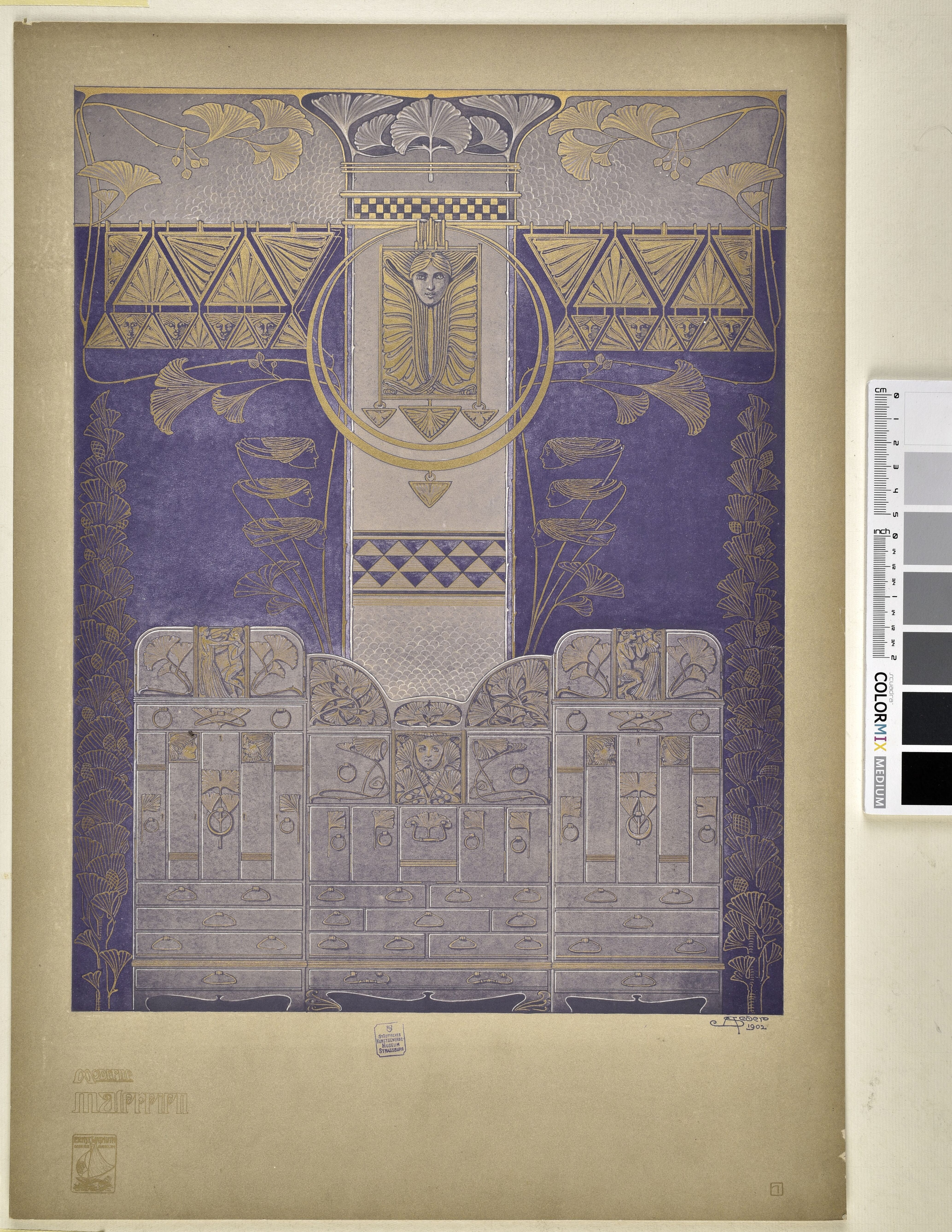
Illustration by Anton Seder, 1903

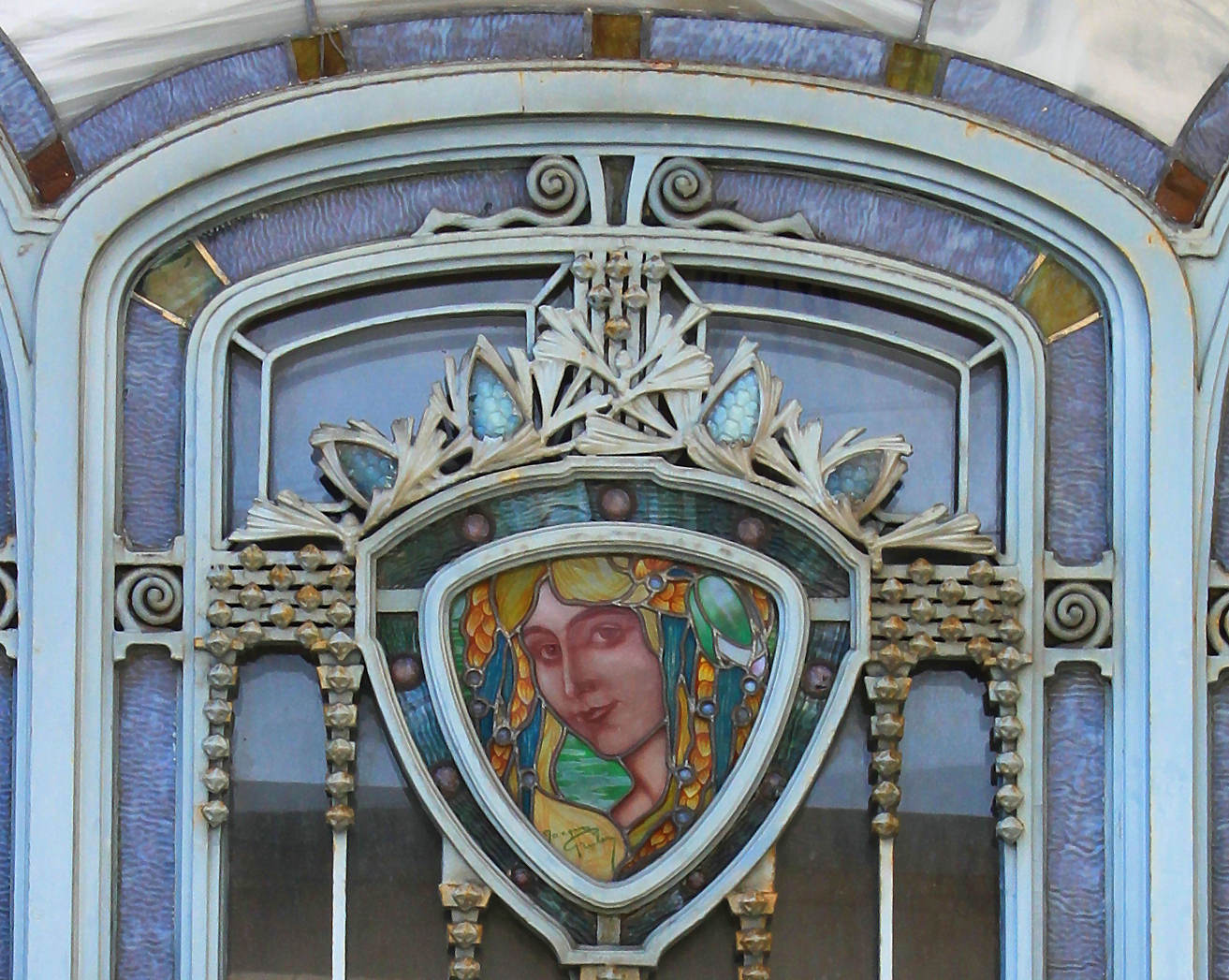
Ginkgo leaf decoration at top of a door, École de Nancy museum

In professional sumo, wrestlers ranked in the two highest divisions (jūryō and makuuchi) wear an elaborate topknot called ōichōmage (大銀杏髷; lit. 'ginkgo-leaf topknot') because it resembles the leaf of the ginkgo tree.

== Sources ==
- Royer, Dana L.; Hickey, Leo J.; Wing, Scott L. (2003). "Ecological conservatism in the 'living fossil' Ginkgo". Paleobiology. 29 (1): 84–104. doi:10.1666/0094-8373(2003)029<0084:ECITLF>2.0.CO;2. S2CID 19865243.
- Taylor, Thomas N.; Taylor, Edith L. (1993). The Biology and Evolution of Fossil Plants. Englewood Cliffs, New Jersey: Prentice Hall. ISBN 0-13-651589-4.
- Wu, Chung-Shien; Chaw, Shu-Miaw; Huang, Ya-Yi (2013). "Chloroplast phylogenomics indicates that Ginkgo biloba is sister to cycads". Genome Biology and Evolution. 5 (1): 243–254. doi:10.1093/gbe/evt001. PMC 3595029. PMID 23315384.
