= Form classification =

Classification of organisms based on their morphology

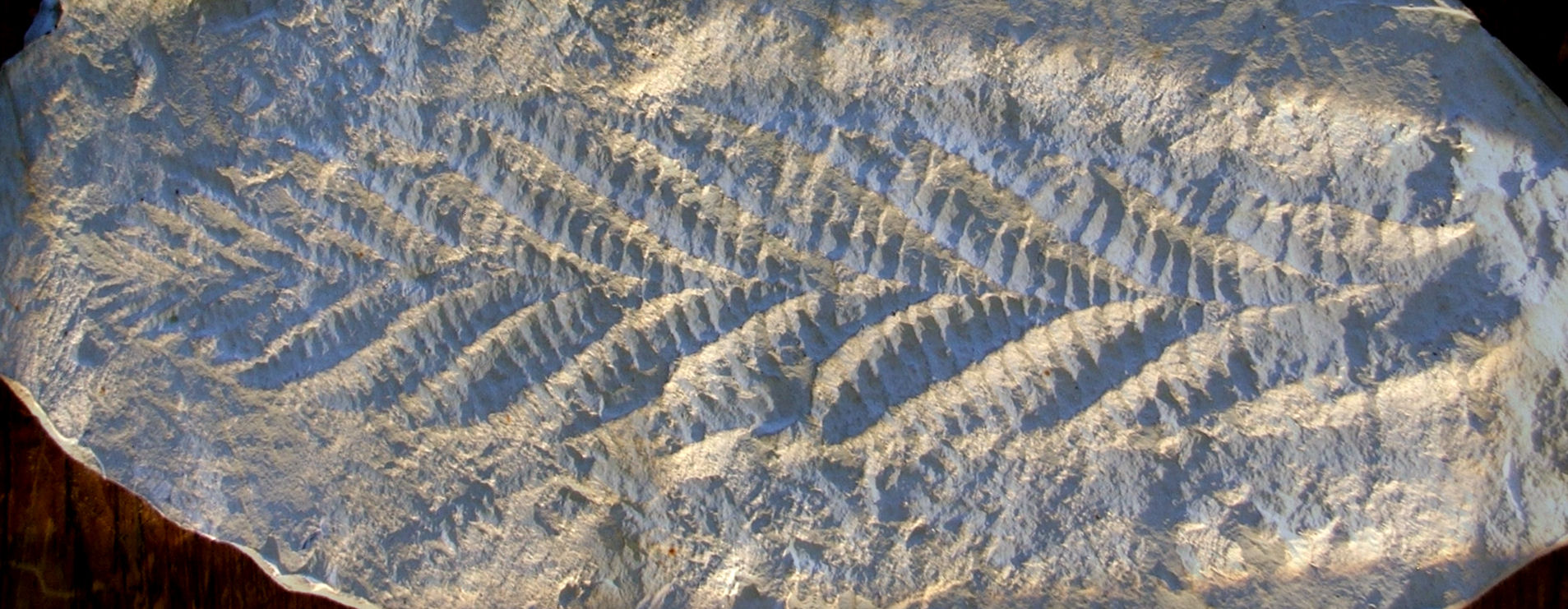
The rangeomorph Charnia. The actual nature or phylogeny of the rangeomorph is not known, leading to form taxa only

Form classification is the classification of organisms based on their morphology, which does not necessarily reflect their biological relationships. Form classification, generally restricted to palaeontology, reflects uncertainty; The goal of science is to move "form taxa" to biological taxa whose affinity is known.

Form taxonomy is restricted to fossils that preserve too few characters for a conclusive taxonomic definition or assessment of their biological affinity, but whose study is made easier if a binomial name is available by which to identify them. The term "form classification" is preferred to "form taxonomy"; taxonomy suggests that the classification implies a biological affinity, whereas form classification is about giving a name to a group of morphologically-similar organisms that may not be related.

A "parataxon" (not to be confused with parataxonomy), or "sciotaxon" (Gr. "shadow taxon"), is a classification based on incomplete data: for instance, the larval stage of an organism that cannot be matched with an adult. It reflects a paucity of data that makes biological classification impossible.

A sciotaxon is defined as a taxon thought to be equivalent to a true taxon (orthotaxon), but whose identity cannot be established because the two candidate taxa are of a different nature and thus cannot be compared directly.

== Examples ==
=== In zoology ===
Form taxa are groupings that are based on common overall forms. Early attempts at classification of labyrinthodonts was based on skull shape (the heavily armoured skulls often being the only preserved part). The amount of convergent evolution in the many groups led to a number of polyphyletic taxa. Such groups are united by a common mode of life, often one that is generalist, in consequence acquiring generally similar body shapes by convergent evolution. Ediacaran biota — whether they are the precursors of the Cambrian explosion of the fossil record, or are unrelated to any modern phylum — can currently only be grouped in "form taxa". Other examples include the seabirds and the "Graculavidae". The latter were initially described as the earliest family of Neornithes but are nowadays recognized to unite a number of unrelated early neornithine lineages, several of which probably later gave rise to the "seabird" form taxon of today.

Fossil eggs are classified according to the parataxonomic system called Veterovata. There are three broad categories in the scheme, on the pattern of organismal phylogenetic classification, called oofamilies, oogenera and oospecies (collectively known as ootaxa). The names of oogenera and oofamilies conventionally contain the root "oolithus" meaning "stone egg", but this rule is not always followed. They are divided up into several basic types: Testudoid, Geckoid, Crocodiloid, Dinosauroid-spherulitic, Dinosauroid-prismatic, and Ornithoid.

=== In botany ===
In paleobotany, two terms were formerly used in the codes of nomenclature, "form genera" and "organ genera", to mean groups of fossils of a particular part of a plant, such as a leaf or seed, whose parent plant is not known because the fossils were preserved unattached to the parent plant. A later term "morphotaxa" also allows for differences in preservational state. These three terms have been replaced as of 2011 by provisions for "fossil-taxa" that are more similar to the provisions for other types of plants.

Names given to organ genera could only be applied to the organs in question, and could not be extended to the entire organism. Fossil-taxon names can cover several parts of an organism, or several preservational states, but do not compete for priority with any names for the same organism that are based on a non-fossil type.

The part of the plant was often, but not universally, indicated by the use of a suffix in the generic name:

- wood fossils may have generic names ending in -xylon
- leaf fossils generic names ending in -phyllum
- fruit fossils generic names ending in -carpon, -carpum or -carpus
- pollen fossils generic names ending in -pollis or -pollenoides.

== See also ==
- Glossary of scientific naming
- Folk taxonomy
- Phenetics
- Taphonomy
- Wastebasket taxon
