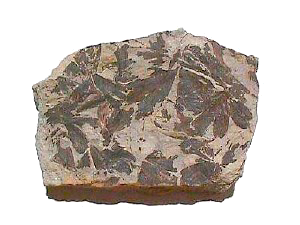
- Jurassic Ginkgo leaves

Scientific classification
- Kingdom: Plantae
- Clade: Embryophytes
- Clade: Tracheophytes
- Clade: Spermatophytes
- Clade: Gymnospermae
- Division: Ginkgophyta
- Class: Ginkgoopsida
- Order: Ginkgoales
- Family: Ginkgoaceae; Engl.

Genera
- †Baiera; †Baieroxylon; †Cheirophyllum; Ginkgo; †Ginkgoites; †Ginkgoidium; †Ginkgopitys; †Phoenicopsis; †Polyspermophyllum; †Trichopitys

= Ginkgoaceae =

Ginkgoaceae Temporal range: Permian–Present

Family of trees

The Ginkgoaceae are a family of gymnosperms which appeared during the Mesozoic Era, of which the only extant representative is Ginkgo biloba, which is for this reason sometimes regarded as a living fossil. Formerly, however, there were several other genera, and forests of ginkgo existed. Because leaves can take such diverse forms within a single species, these are a poor measure of diversity, although differing structures of wood point to the existence of diverse ginkgo forests in ancient times.
