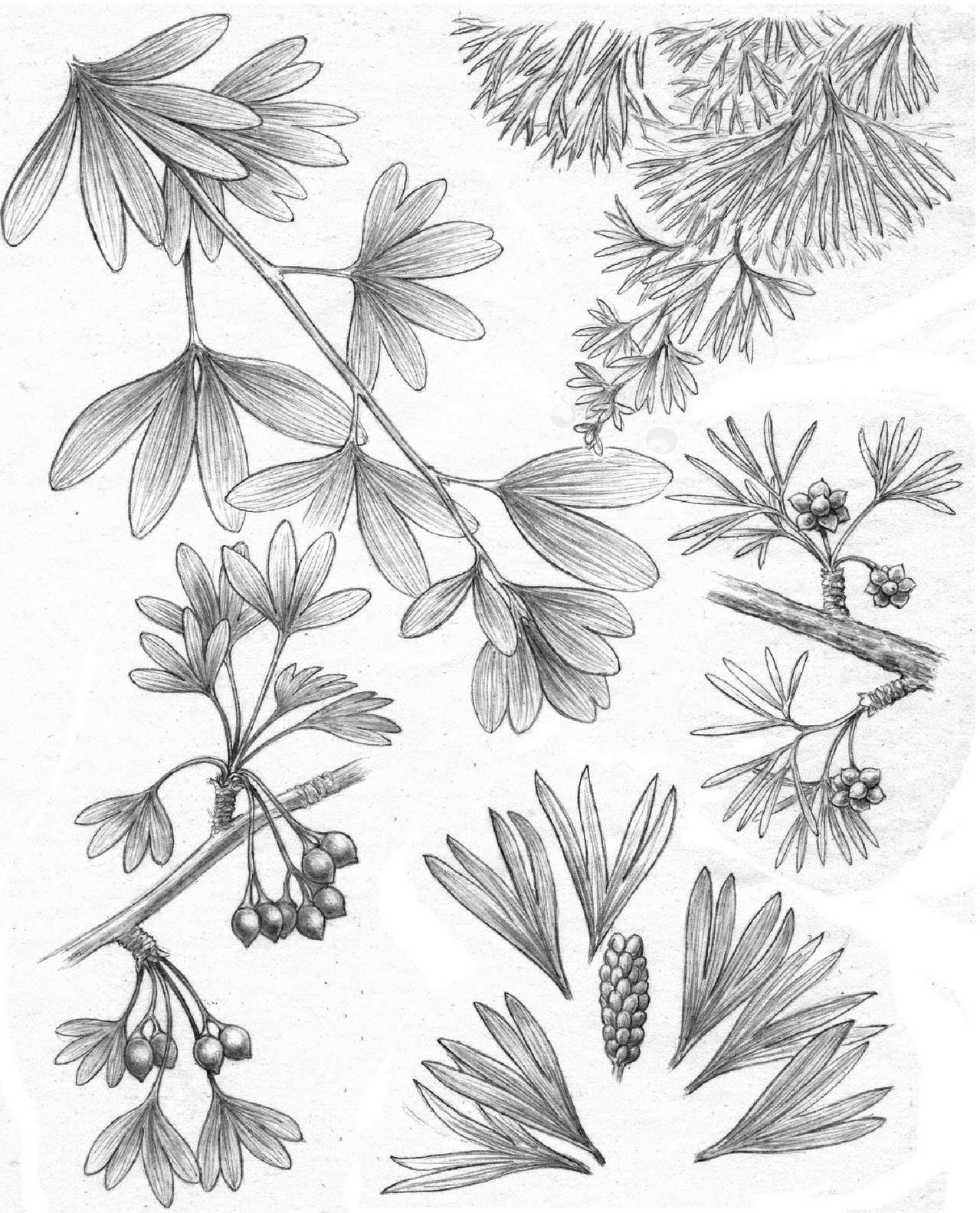
- Leaves and seeds of Ginkgo yimaensis (left) Yimaia recurva (top right) and Karkenia henanensis (bottom right)

Scientific classification
- Kingdom: Plantae
- Clade: Embryophytes
- Clade: Tracheophytes
- Clade: Gymnosperms
- Division: Ginkgophyta
- Class: Ginkgoopsida
- Order: Ginkgoales; Gorozh.

Families
- Ginkgoaceae; †Karkeniaceae; †Umaltolepidaceae; †Yimaiaceae; †Schmeissneriaceae; †Hamshawviaceae (sometimes placed in its own order); Unassigned to family; †Ginkgoites (leaves); †Sphenobaiera (leaves); †Baiera (leaves); †Glossophyllum (leaves); †Trichopitys (ovulate organ); †Stachyopitys (pollen organ)

= Ginkgoales =

Ginkgoales Temporal range: Permian–present

Order of plants

Ginkgoales are a gymnosperm order containing only one extant species: Ginkgo biloba, the ginkgo tree. The order has a long fossil record extending back to the Early Permian around 300 million years ago from fossils found worldwide. The order was a common component of Permian and Triassic flora before the super dominance of conifers.

== Evolution ==
Ginkgophyta and Cycadophyta have a very ancient divergence dating to the early Carboniferous. The earliest representative of the group in the fossil record is probably Trichopitys from the Asselian (299-293 million years ago) of France. The earliest representatives of Ginkgo, represented by reproductive organs similar to the living species, first appear in the Middle Jurassic, alongside other, related forms such as Yimaia and Karkenia, which have differently arranged reproductive structures and seeds associated with Ginkgo-like leaves. The diversity of Ginkgoales declined during the Late Cretaceous and Cenozoic, coincident with the rise of flowering plants, with all Ginkgophytes aside from Ginkgo being extinct by the end of the Cretaceous. The only remaining Ginkgophyte was Ginkgo adiantoides – a polymorphic species. Modern Ginkgo trees are native to China.

== Reproduction ==
Ginkgo trees produce ovulate and pollen-bearing structures. These structures are dioecious, in that male and female structures come from different Ginkgo plants. The pollen organs are very similar to angiospermous catkins. They come from the axils of the bud scales, and the leaves from the Ginkgo tree spur shoots. Pollen is contained in sacs of two to four at the tips of sporophylls on the strobiloid. Ovules of Ginkgo trees come from stalks from leaf axils on the short shoots, each containing two ovules. The ovule is fertilized by the flagellated male gametes, which can move about freely. This fertilization process begins on the tree itself in the spring. The swollen fruit-like ovules, about 2–3 cm in diameter, fall from the tree in the fall, and fertilization continues into the winter/spring. This ovule contains a single large seed, similar to that of a cycad.

== Morphology ==
=== Ginkgophyte wood ===
Fossils that appear Ginkgo-like are filed under a morphogenus called Ginkgoxylon, Ginkgomyeloxylon, or Protoginkgoxylon. Fossilized ginkgophyte wood is not commonly found in the record, possibly because it degrades easily, and possibly because it is difficult to tell apart from the much more pervasive conifer samples. Like conifer wood, it has secondary thin-walled xylem and a primary vascular system composed of eustele and bifacial vascular cambium. The tracheids in the secondary xylem rays have pitting that occurs only on the walls and is circularly bordered.

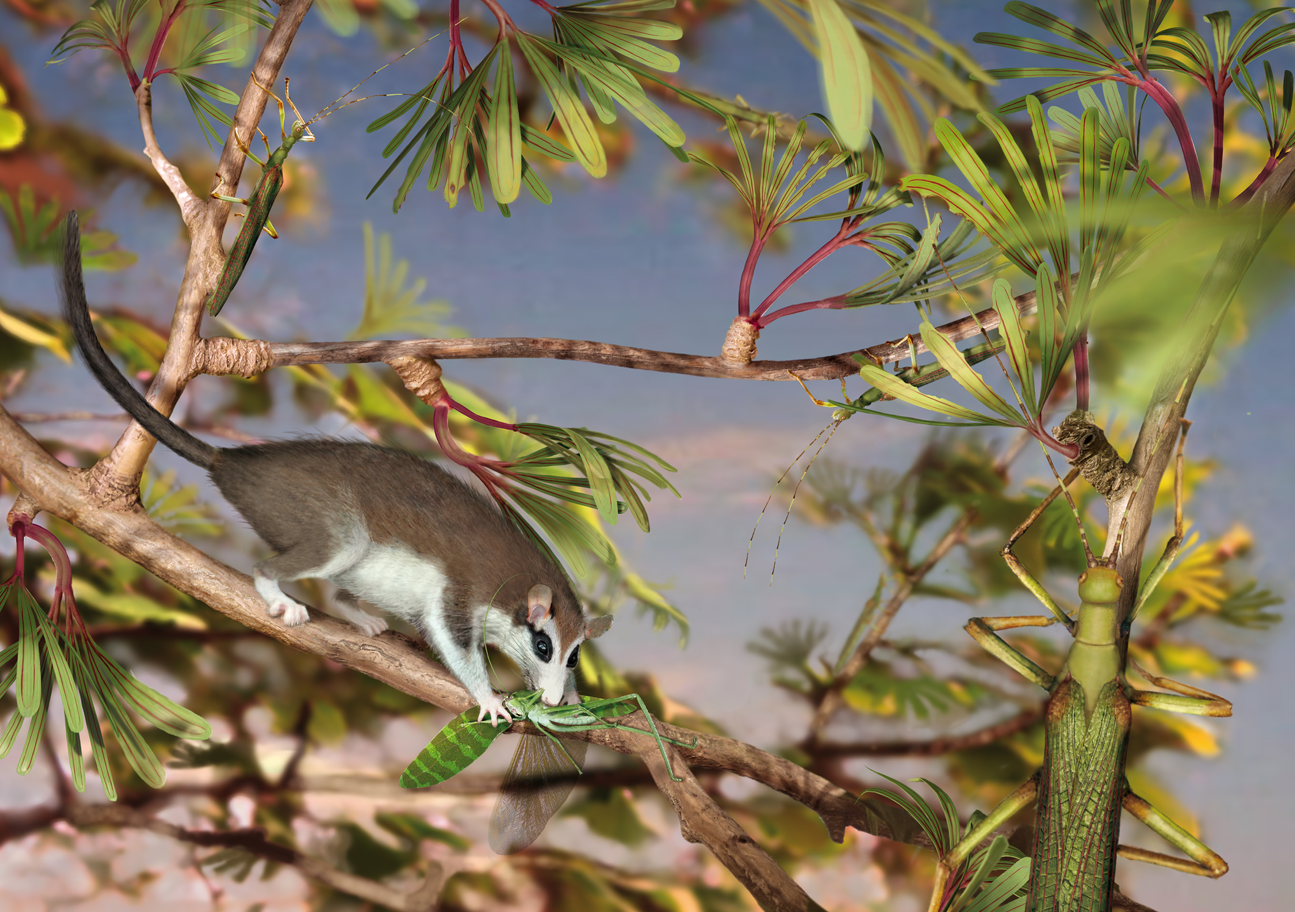
This recreation displays one example of early Ginkgophyte foliage.

=== Ginkgophyte foliage ===
Ginkgophyte foliage has stayed largely consistent since the Mesozoic. Its historically wide territory makes it an important leaf morphology, and its unique stomata and isotopic profile give it a key role in recreations of the Mesozoic and Cenozoic. Leaf fossils that resemble the Ginkgophytes are known as Ginkgoites. There are similar, now extinct, morphogens, such as Sphenobaiera, which describes fan-shaped, deeply divided leaves without clear petioles.

The distinctive shape of the modern Ginkgo biloba gives the impression of a very narrow leaf morphology, but the group is varied and diverse. The genus Ginkgo by itself contains a range of morphologies. Ginkgo digitata, from the Jurassic, has long, wedge-shaped laminae with the intercostal regions covered in stomata and resin bodies, while G. pluripartita has at most 2 cm-long leaves and is intercostally hypostomatic.

== Fossil gallery ==
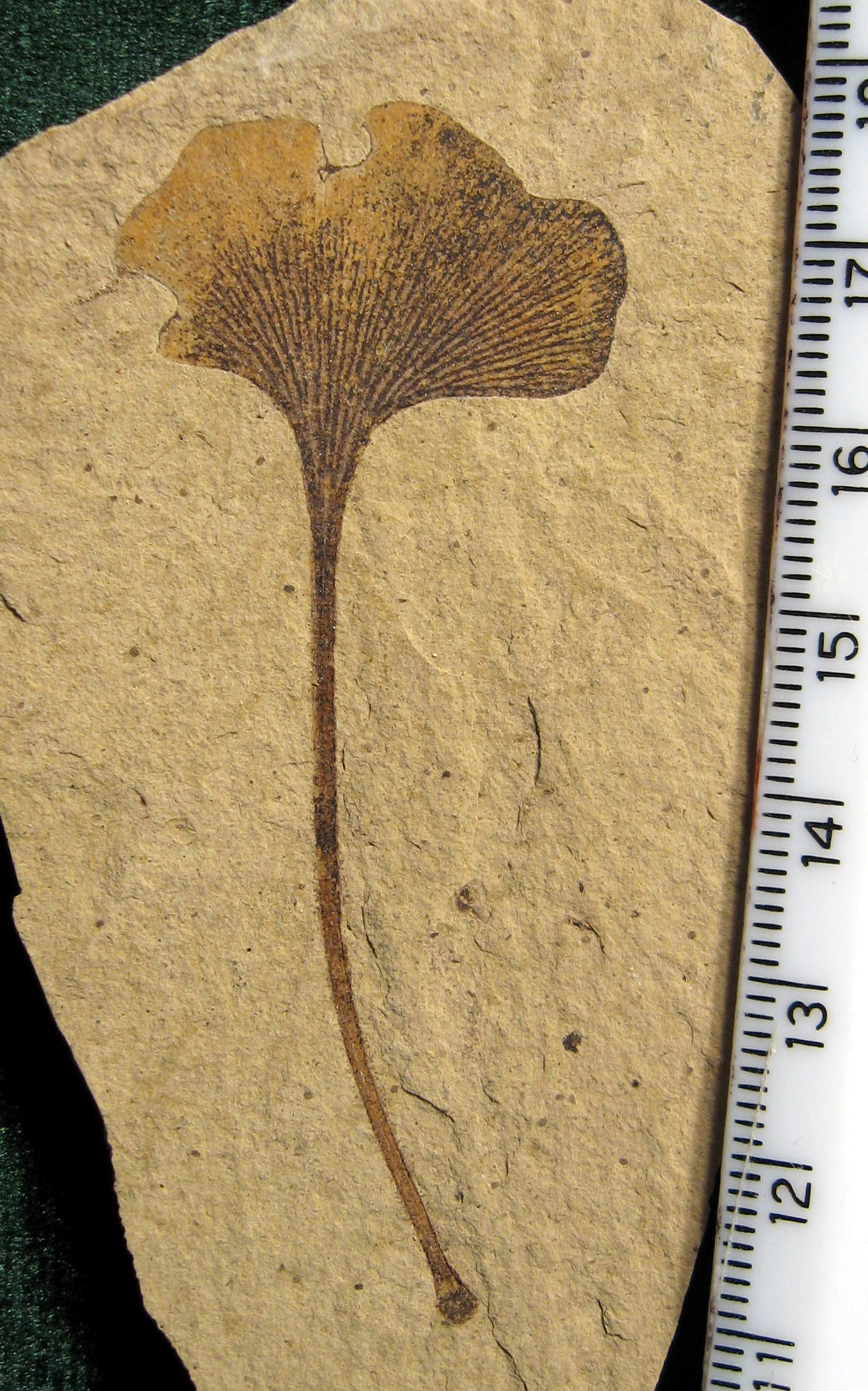
A 6.7 cm tall Ginkgo biloba leaf, with insect herbivory. Klondike Mountain Formation, Republic, Ferry County, Washington, USA, Eocene, Ypresian, 49 million years old

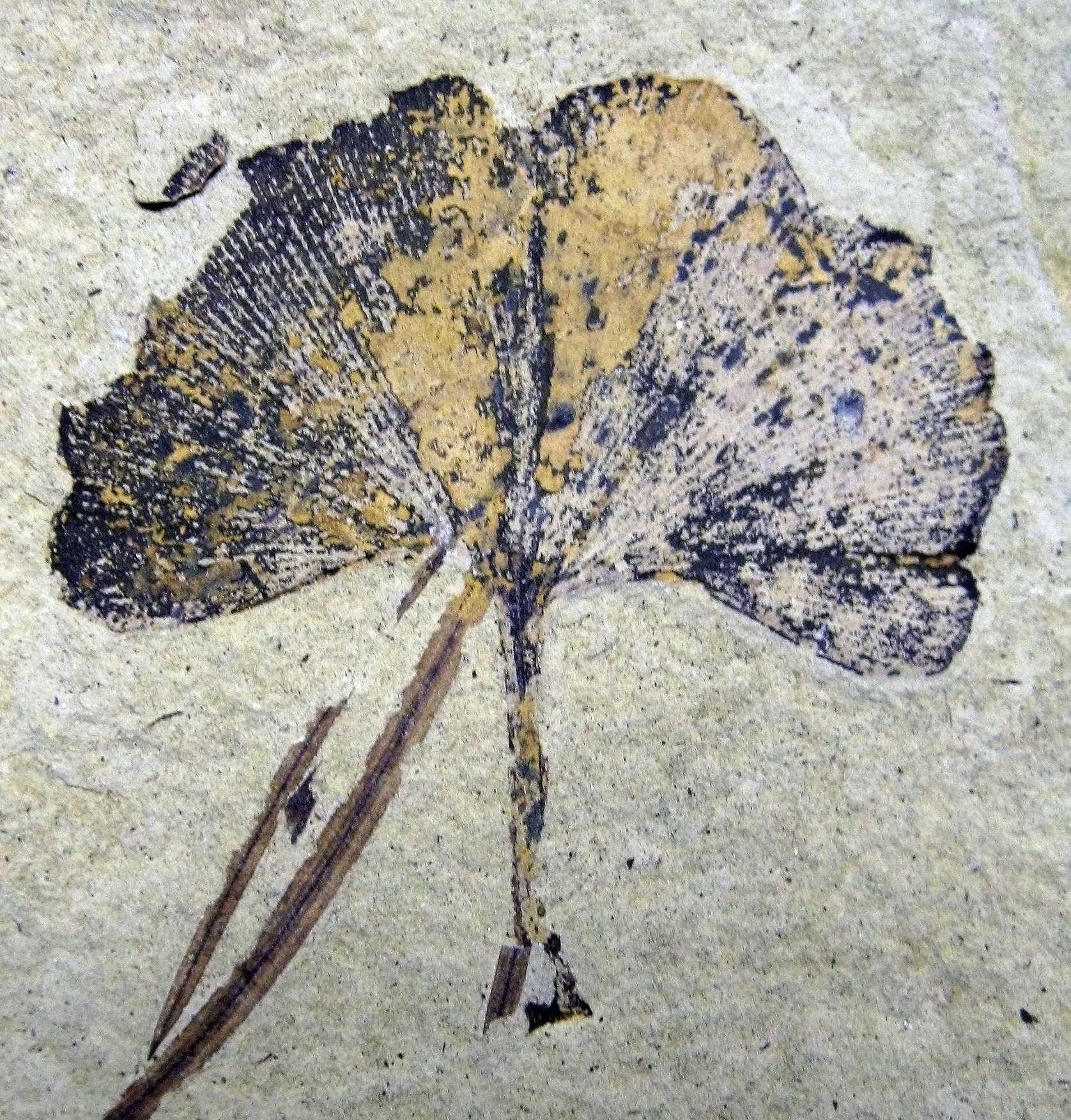
A 70 mm-wide Ginkgo biloba leaf. Klondike Mountain Formation, Republic, Ferry County, Washington, USA, Eocene, Ypresian, 49 million years old

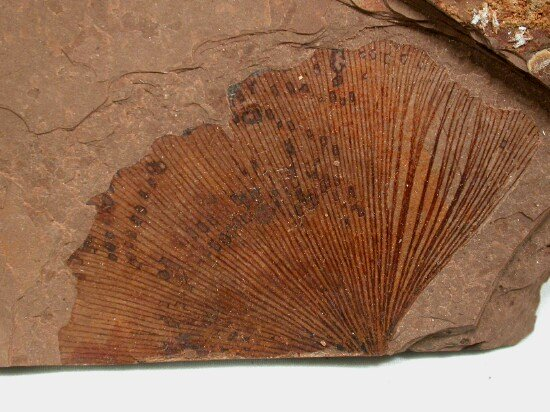
Ginkgo biloba Eocene fossil leaf from the Tranquille Shale of MacAbee, British Columbia, Canada

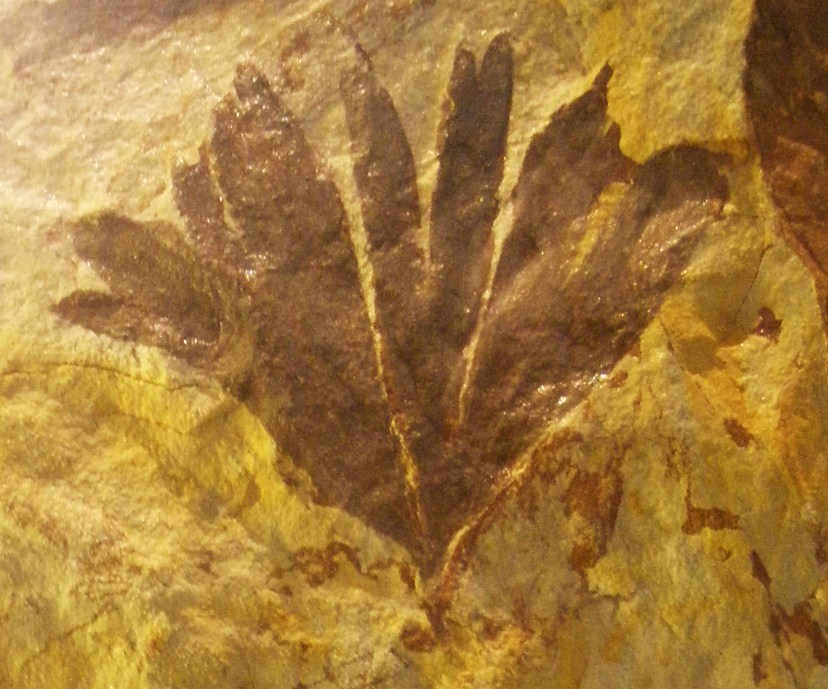
Fossil of Ginkgo huttoni. Photo taken at Naturalis Museum in Leiden, The Netherlands.

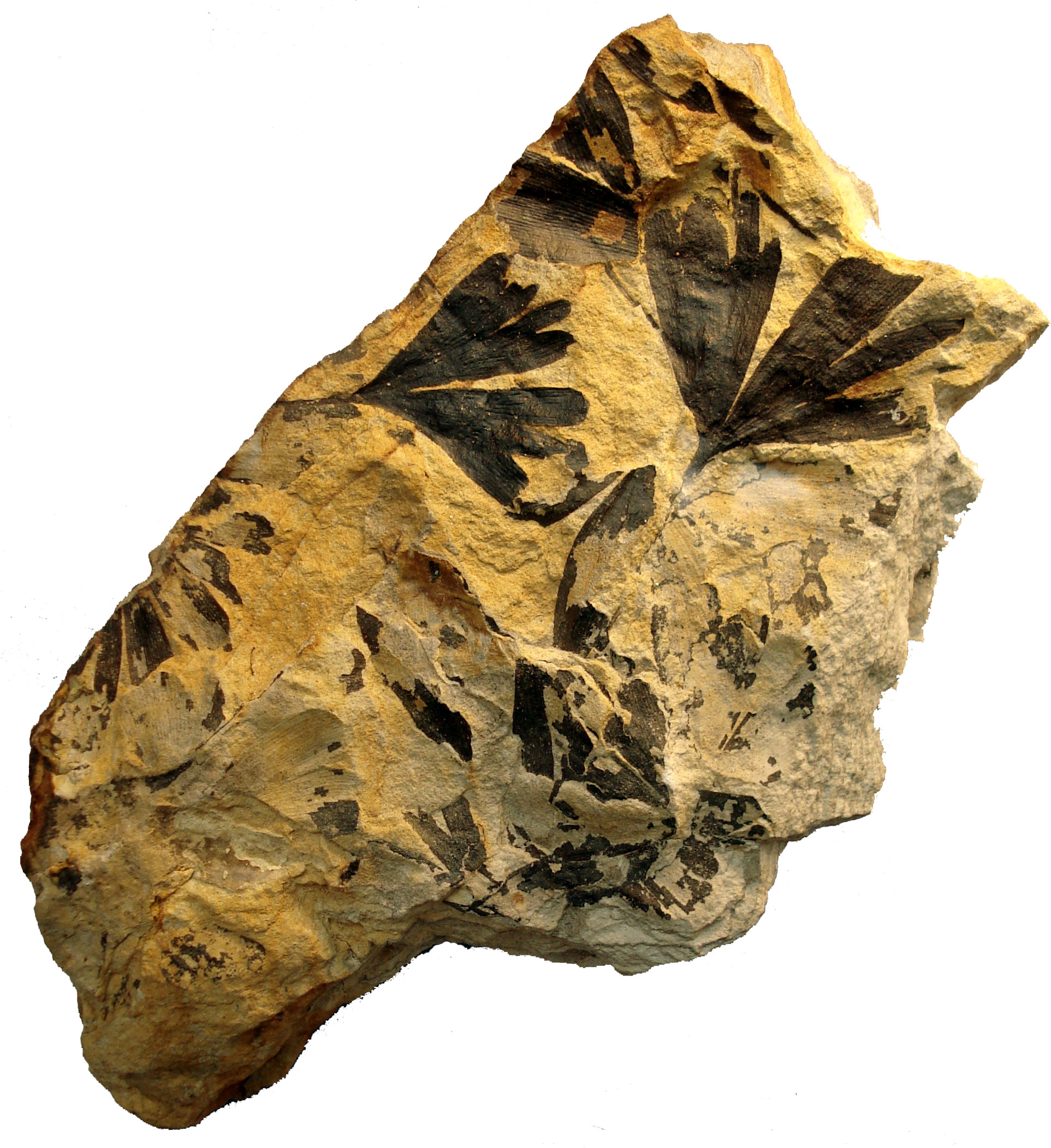
Fossil of Ginkgoites huttoni
