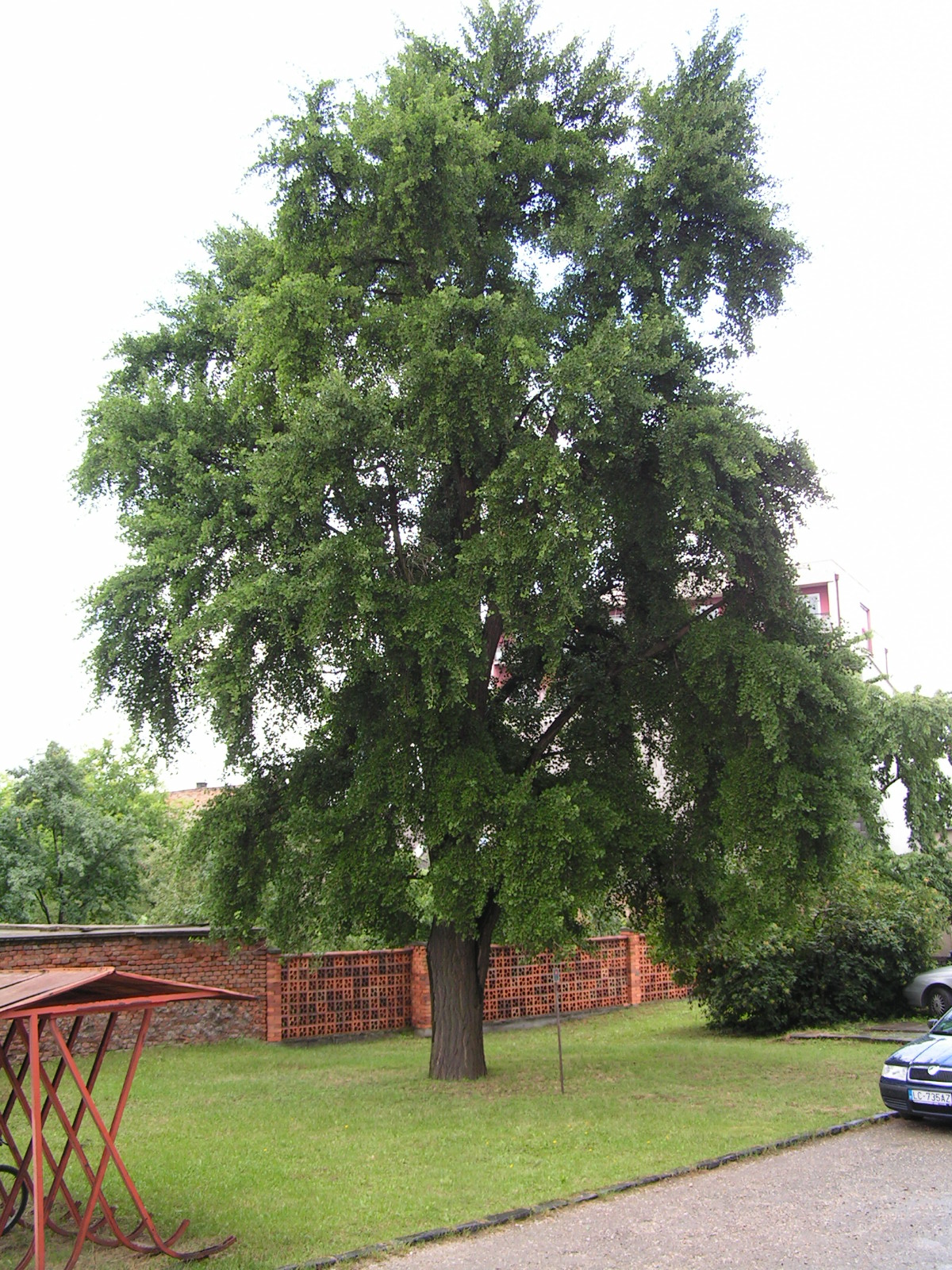
- Ginkgo biloba

Scientific classification
- Kingdom: Plantae
- Clade: Embryophytes
- Clade: Tracheophytes
- Clade: Gymnosperms
- Division: Ginkgophyta
- Class: Ginkgoopsida; Meyen

Proposed orders
- Ginkgoales; †Czekanowskiales; †Peltaspermales?; †Corystospermales? (Umkomasiales); †Caytoniales?; †Dicranophyllales?; †Calamopityales?; †Callistophytales?; †Glossopteridales?; †"Palaeophyllales"?

= Ginkgoopsida =

Ginkgoopsida Temporal range: Carboniferous–Recent

Class of plants

Ginkgoopsida is a proposed class of gymnosperms defined by Sergei V. Meyen in 1984 to encompass Ginkgoales (which contains the living Ginkgo) alongside a number of extinct seed plant groups, which he considered to be closely related based on similarities of morphology of pollen, seeds, cuticles, short shoots and leaves. The validity of this group as a whole has been considered questionable by other authors, who consider that it is unlikely to be monophyletic. Other authors have used the class as a monotypic grouping, including only Ginkgoales. Some authors have used the clade Ginkgophyta to encompass both Ginkgoales and Czekanowskiales/Leptostrobales, which are suggested to be closely related groups.
