= Postmenopausal confusion =

Cognitive problems associated with menopause

- Other names: Postmenopausal brain fog, menopause brain fog
- Specialty: Gynecology, Midwifery, Neuroscience
- Symptoms: Forgetfulness, difficulty concentrating
- Usual onset: Menopause

Postmenopausal confusion, also commonly referred to as postmenopausal brain fog, is a group of symptoms of menopause in which women report problems with cognition at a higher frequency during postmenopause than before.

Multiple studies on cognitive performance following menopause have reported noticeable declines in greater than 60% of the patients. The common issues presented included impairments in reaction time and attention, difficulty recalling numbers or words, and forgetting reasons for involvement in certain behaviors. Association between subjective cognitive complaints and objective measures of performance show a significant impact on health-related quality of life for postmenopausal women.

Treatment primarily involves symptom management through non-pharmacological treatment strategies. This includes involvement in physical activity and following medically supervised diets, especially those that contain phytoestrogens or resveratrol. Pharmacological interventions in treating postmenopausal confusion are currently being researched. Hormone replacement therapy (HRT) is currently not indicated for the treatment of postmenopausal confusion due to inefficacy. The use of HRT for approved indications has identified no significant negative effect on postmenopausal cognition.

Although much of the literature references women, all people who undergo menopause, including those who do not self-identify as women, may experience symptoms of postmenopausal confusion.

== History ==
Research on menopause as a whole declined with the end of the Women's Health Initiative (WHI) studies, but research on the treatment of symptoms associated with menopause—especially the treatment of cognitive decline—continues. The Study of Women's Health Across the Nation (SWAN), first started in 1996, continues to publish progress reports which include cognitive symptoms associated with menopausal transition, including those in postmenopause. As of 2019, SWAN indicated, "Approximately 60% of midlife women report problems with memory during the [menopause transition], yet studies of measured cognitive performance during the transition are rare."

Although there are many relationships between hormone levels in postmenopause and cognitive function, the previously favored HRT therapies (estrogen therapies) have been shown to be ineffective in specifically treating postmenopausal confusion. The use of hormone replacement therapies, once considered detrimental to cognition in postmenopausal women, has now been shown to have no negative effect when used properly for approved indications. There are no conclusive studies to support any pharmacological agents, but several potential drug candidates are still being explored.

== Presentation ==
Menopause is a natural decline in the ovarian function of women who reach the age between 45 and 54 years. "About 25 million women pass through menopause worldwide each year, and it has been estimated that, by the year 2030, the world population of menopausal and postmenopausal women will be 1.2 billion, with 47 million new entrants each year."

Postmenopause begins immediately following menopause (one year after the final menstrual cycle). Postmenopausal confusion is often manifested through the following cognitive symptoms: memory problems, forgetfulness, and poor concentration. Confusion which is otherwise unexplained and coincides with the onset of postmenopause may be postmenopausal confusion.

== Causes ==
=== Risk factors ===
==== Hypertension ====
A 2019 literature review identified hypertension and history of pre-eclampsia as significant risk factors for the accelerated decline of cognitive function in women during midlife. Although the mechanism remains unclear, neuroimaging studies included in the review found that those with hypertension have evident structural changes in their brains; specifically, gray matter brain volume decreased and white matter hyperintensity volume increased.

==== Atherosclerosis and comorbidities ====
Atherosclerosis and comorbidities such as hyperlipidemia and diabetes mellitus have long been considered risk factors for cognitive decline because they have the propensity to cause the formation of amyloid plaques (aggregates of misfolded, deleterious proteins) in the brain.

==== Insomnia ====
Many postmenopausal women report insomnia. Studies have shown "associations between poor sleep quality and cognitive decline" in postmenopausal women as those with insufficient sleep, or with difficulty falling or staying asleep, reported decreased cognitive performance including "verbal memory, attention, and general cognition."

==== Depression ====
There is evidence linking depression and cognitive decline in postmenopausal women. Research suggests that increased cortisol levels from depressive episodes may affect the hippocampus, area of the brain responsible for episodic memory. Studies have also shown a correlation between depression and decreased cognitive performance including "processing speed, verbal memory, and working memory" in postmenopausal women.

==== Hot flashes ====
There are studies indicating a correlation between frequency of hot flashes in postmenopausal women and a deficit in verbal memory performance. It is suggested that faster blood flow in the brain or higher cortisol levels from hot flashes may cause changes in the brain and affect information processing and memory.

==== Surgical menopause ====
A 2019 systematic review and meta-analysis identified surgical menopause, especially when performed at or before the age of 45, as a substantial risk factor for cognitive decline and dementia.

==== Cardiac procedures ====
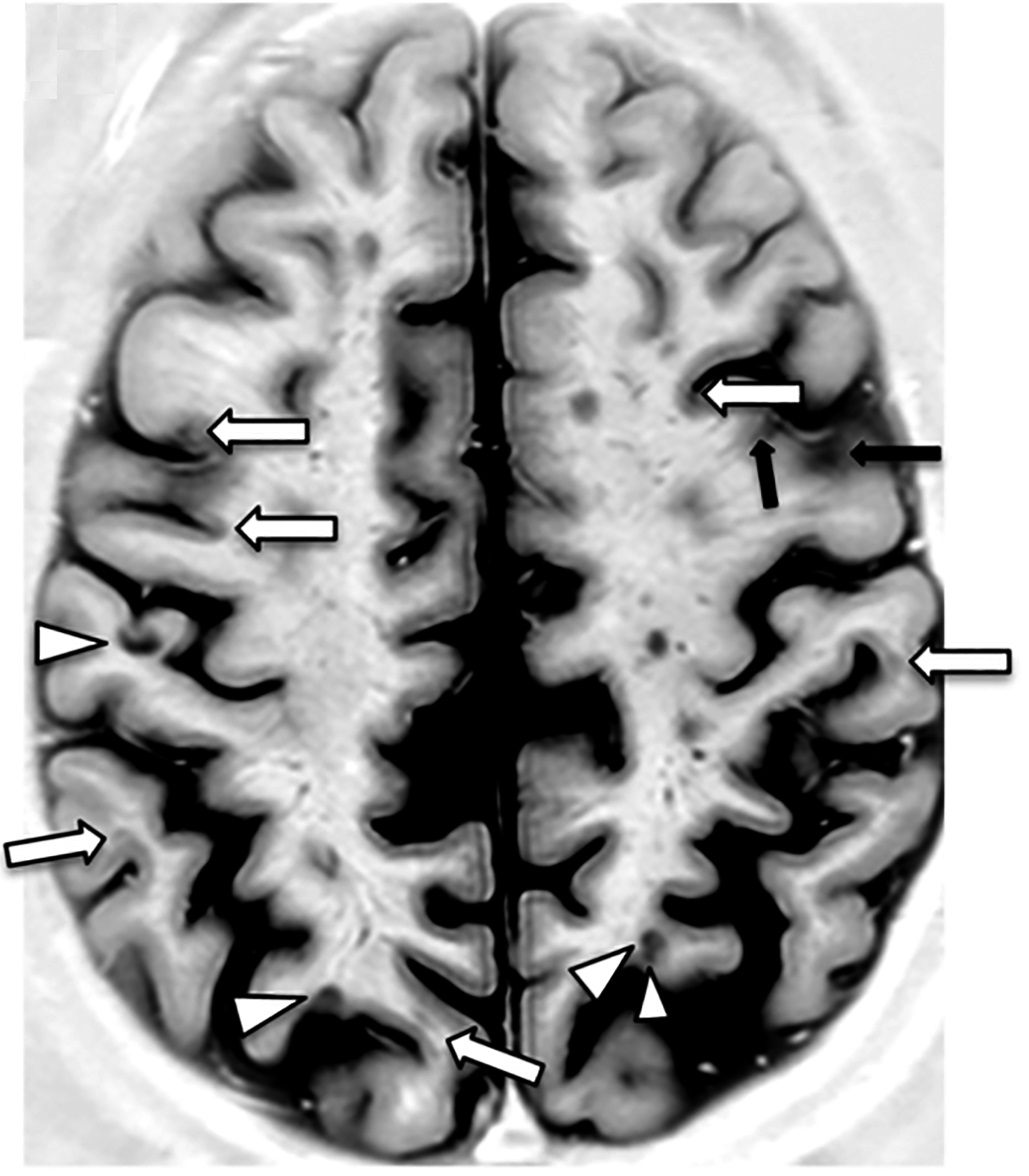
Lesions in the brain as indicated by arrows.

Cardiac procedures such as invasive cerebral and coronary angiography, coronary artery bypass graft surgery (CABG), surgical aortic valve replacement, and transcatheter aortic valve replacement (TAVR) have been found to increase the risk of cognitive decline in females as they been found to increase the incidence of brain lesions.

High fat diet

There is a 2025 mouse study that show that when chemically-induced menopause is in combination with a high-fat diet, recognition memory and spatial learning could be impaired. However, more research needs to be done on the relevance to humans.

== Mechanism ==
Menopause-related cognitive declines are often connected to the changes in ovarian hormones, sleep disturbances, mood changes, vasomotor symptoms (VMS), and psychosocial factors. Lower-estrogen activity in the hippocampus and prefrontal cortex of the brain also plays a crucial role because of its relation with verbal memory and functioning. Lower estradiol levels after oophorectomy and gonadotropin-releasing hormones contribute to the decline in memory.

The mechanism of postmenopausal confusion is poorly understood because of age related changes and the different diagnoses that present similar symptoms overtime. However, research remains ongoing.

== Treatment ==
=== Overview ===
There are pharmacological and non-pharmacological considerations in improving the symptoms of postmenopausal confusion. Currently, there are no pharmacological agents used to specifically treat postmenopausal confusion; however treatments that are used for menopause and other related conditions are considered. Non-pharmacological strategies to manage postmenopausal confusion symptoms are utilized, with focus on diet and exercise.

=== Pharmacological ===
==== Hormone therapy ====
Hormone therapy, also known as estrogen therapy, was previously a common treatment for postmenopausal confusion. However, more recent research indicates that hormone therapy is not an effective treatment for postmenopausal cognitive symptoms. A 2008 Cochrane review of 16 trials concluded that there is a body of evidence that suggests that hormone replacement therapy is unable to prevent cognitive decline or maintain cognitive function in healthy postmenopausal women when given over a short or long period of time. Conversely, studies have also suggested that the use of hormone replacement therapy are unlikely to have negative cognitive effects when used for their approved indications.

Previous research suggested that increases in blood flow to the hippocampus and temporal lobe occurred from hormone therapy, improving postmenopausal confusion symptoms. More recent research no longer supports this, and is inconclusive as to the true effects of estrogen on hippocampal volume as studies show results differing from improved cognition and maintained hippocampal volume when hormone therapy is administered during menopause to results showing no obvious beneficial results.

Research focusing on adiponectin (ADPN) has yielded positive results in the development of possible treatments for postmenopausal confusion. A study has shown an association between higher levels of ADPN and increased cognitive performance in postmenopausal women. However, an ADPN receptor agonist has yet to be discovered.

==== Psychostimulant therapy ====
There is ongoing research regarding the efficacy of psychostimulant drugs such as lisdexamphetamine (Vyvanse) and atomoxetine (Strattera) in treating postmenopausal and menopausal confusion.

=== Non-pharmacological ===
==== Diet ====
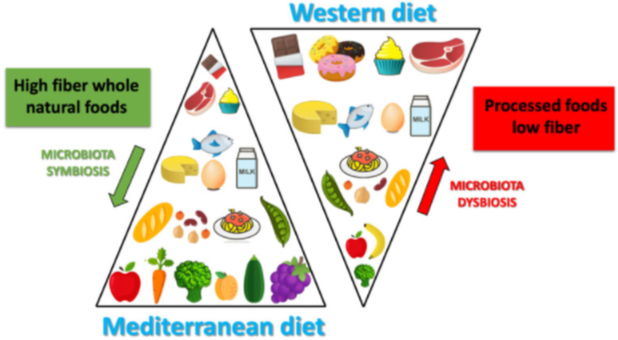
An illustration depicting the differences between a Western diet and a Mediterranean diet.

Individuals play an important role in maintaining their cognitive health. One way to achieve this is by the promotion of healthy nutrition. In particular, the Mediterranean diet, defined as being low in saturated fat and high in vegetable oils, showed improvement in aspects of cognitive function. This diet consists of low intake of sweets and eggs, moderate intakes of meat and fish, dairy products and red wine, and high intake of leafy green vegetables, pulses/legumes and nuts, fruits, cereal, and cold pressed extra virgin olive oil. Further analysis concluded that the Mediterranean diet supplemented by olive oil resulted in better cognition and memory as compared to the Mediterranean diet plus mixed nuts combination.

==== Supplementation ====
Soy isoflavones (SIF), a type of phytoestrogen which can be found in soybeans, fruits and nuts, has been shown to improve cognitive outcomes in recent postmenopausal women of less than 10 years. This suggests that the initiation of SIF may have a critical margin of opportunity when used at a younger age in postmenopausal women. In addition to improved cognitive functions and visual memory, no evidence of harm from SIF supplementation was revealed with the dose ranges tested in multiple trials.

Analysis of multiple randomized controlled trials have brought attention to black cohosh and red clover (which contain phytoestrogen) and its potential as an efficacious treatment of menopausal symptoms. Black cohosh did not reveal any evidence of risk of harm, but lack of good evidence cannot firmly conclude its safety. Overall, the results suggested that neither botanical treatments provided any cognitive benefits.

Resveratrol, another bioactive compound derived from plants, has also shown to improve cognitive performance in postmenopausal women. There are ongoing trials studying the cognitive benefits of resveratrol in early versus late postmenopausal women.

Chronic ginkgo biloba supplementation has been shown to improve "mental flexibility" in "older and more cognitively impaired" postmenopausal women. However, a combined ginkgo biloba and ginger supplementation had no effect on memory or cognitive performance in postmenopausal women.

Dehydroepiandrosterone (DHEA) supplementation may improve cognition in women with postmenopausal confusion but does not benefit those without cognitive impairment. More long-term studies are required to study the efficacy of DHEA and its role in cognition and postmenopausal women.

==== Exercise ====
Regular physical exercise may prevent symptoms of postmenopausal confusion. Studies have shown an association between exercise and "lower rates of cognitive decline" in postmenopausal women. On the other hand, an inactive lifestyle has been strongly associated with "higher rates of cognitive decline" in postmenopausal women.

==== Mind-body therapy ====
Studies have shown benefits of mind-body therapies in women with postmenopausal symptoms including cognitive impairment. Mindfulness, hypnosis, and yoga may help decrease symptoms of insomnia, depression, or hot flashes in postmenopausal women which leads to better cognitive performance.

== See also ==
- Chronic fatigue syndrome
- Estrogen and neurodegenerative diseases
- Menopause in the workplace
