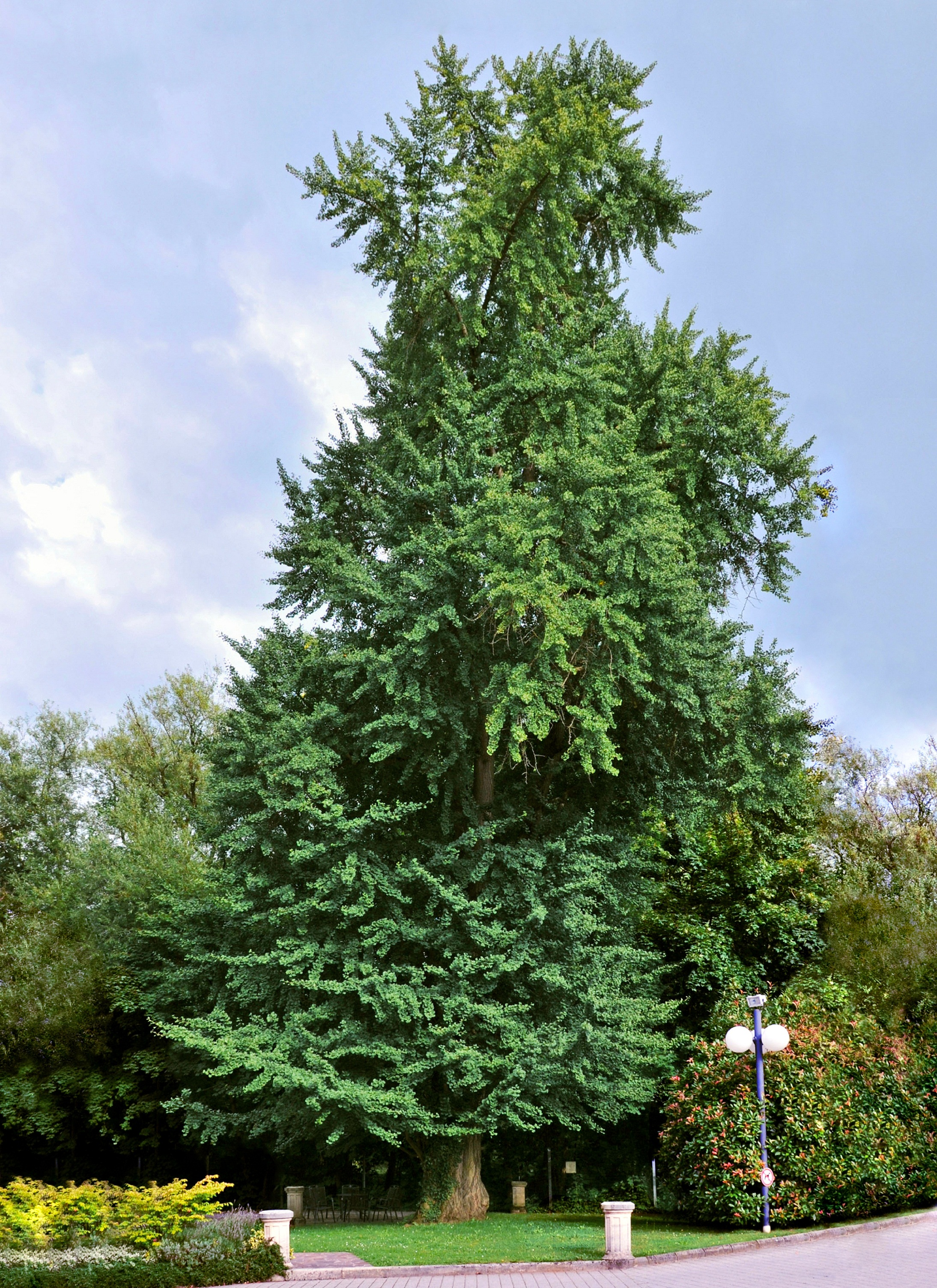

Conservation status
- Endangered (IUCN 3.1)

- Critically Imperiled (NatureServe)

Scientific classification
- Kingdom: Plantae
- Clade: Tracheophytes
- Clade: Gymnosperms
- Division: Ginkgophyta
- Class: Ginkgoopsida
- Order: Ginkgoales
- Family: Ginkgoaceae
- Genus: Ginkgo
- Species: G. biloba

Binomial name
- Ginkgo biloba L.

Synonyms
- Ginkgo macrophylla K.Koch; Pterophyllus salisburiensis J.Nelson, nom. illeg.; Salisburia adiantifolia Sm., nom. illeg.; Salisburia biloba (L.) Hoffmanns.; Salisburia ginkgo Rich., nom. illeg.; Salisburia macrophylla Reyn.

= Ginkgo biloba =

Ginkgo biloba Temporal range: 51.5–0 Ma Early Eocene (Ypresian) – Present

Species of tree

Ginkgo biloba, commonly known as ginkgo (/ˈɡɪŋkoʊ, ˈɡɪŋkɡoʊ/ GINK-oh, -goh), also known as the maidenhair tree, and often misspelled "gingko" (see Taxonomy below) is a species of gymnosperm tree native to East Asia. It is the last living species in the order Ginkgoales, which first appeared over 290 million years ago. Fossils similar to the living species, belonging to the genus Ginkgo, extend back to the Middle Jurassic epoch about 170 million years ago. The tree was cultivated early in human history, remains commonly planted, and is widely regarded as a living fossil.

G. biloba is a long-lived, disease-resistant, dioecious tree with unique fan-shaped leaves, capable of clonal reproduction, and known for its striking yellow autumn foliage and resilience in disturbed environments. It was known historically as "silver fruit" or "white fruit" in Chinese and called "ginkgo" due to a centuries-old transcription error. It is closely related to cycads and characterized by unique seeds that resemble apricots but are not true fruits.

G. biloba, once widespread but thought extinct in the wild for centuries, is now commonly cultivated in East Asia, with some genetically diverse populations possibly representing rare wild survivors in southwestern China's mountainous regions. Some G. biloba trees have survived extreme events like the Hiroshima atomic bomb. Others show extreme longevity; G. biloba specimens have been measured in excess of 1,600 years, and the largest living trees are estimated to exceed 3,500 years. Today, it is widely planted in cities worldwide for its pollution tolerance and ornamental value.

G. biloba wood is valued for its durability and used in crafts and sake-making, while its seeds are popular in Asian cuisine despite health risks, including potential carcinogenicity, allergic reactions, poisoning due to ginkgotoxin, drug interactions, and adverse effects such as bleeding and neurological symptoms, especially with excessive or improper use. Ginkgo-based products are widely marketed for cognitive benefits, although clinical research shows limited medical effectiveness except possibly for dementia, with approval in the European Union but not by the United States Food and Drug Administration.

== Description ==
Ginkgos have a conical crown in youth which becomes progressively broader and more irregular with age. They are large trees, normally reaching a height of 20–35 m (66–115 ft), with some specimens in China being over 40 m (130 ft). The tree has an angular crown and long, somewhat erratic branches, and is usually deep-rooted and resistant to wind and snow damage. Young trees are often tall and slender, and sparsely branched; the crown becomes broader as the tree ages. A combination of resistance to disease, insect-resistant wood, and the ability to form aerial roots and sprouts makes ginkgos durable, with some specimens estimated to be more than 3,500 years old.

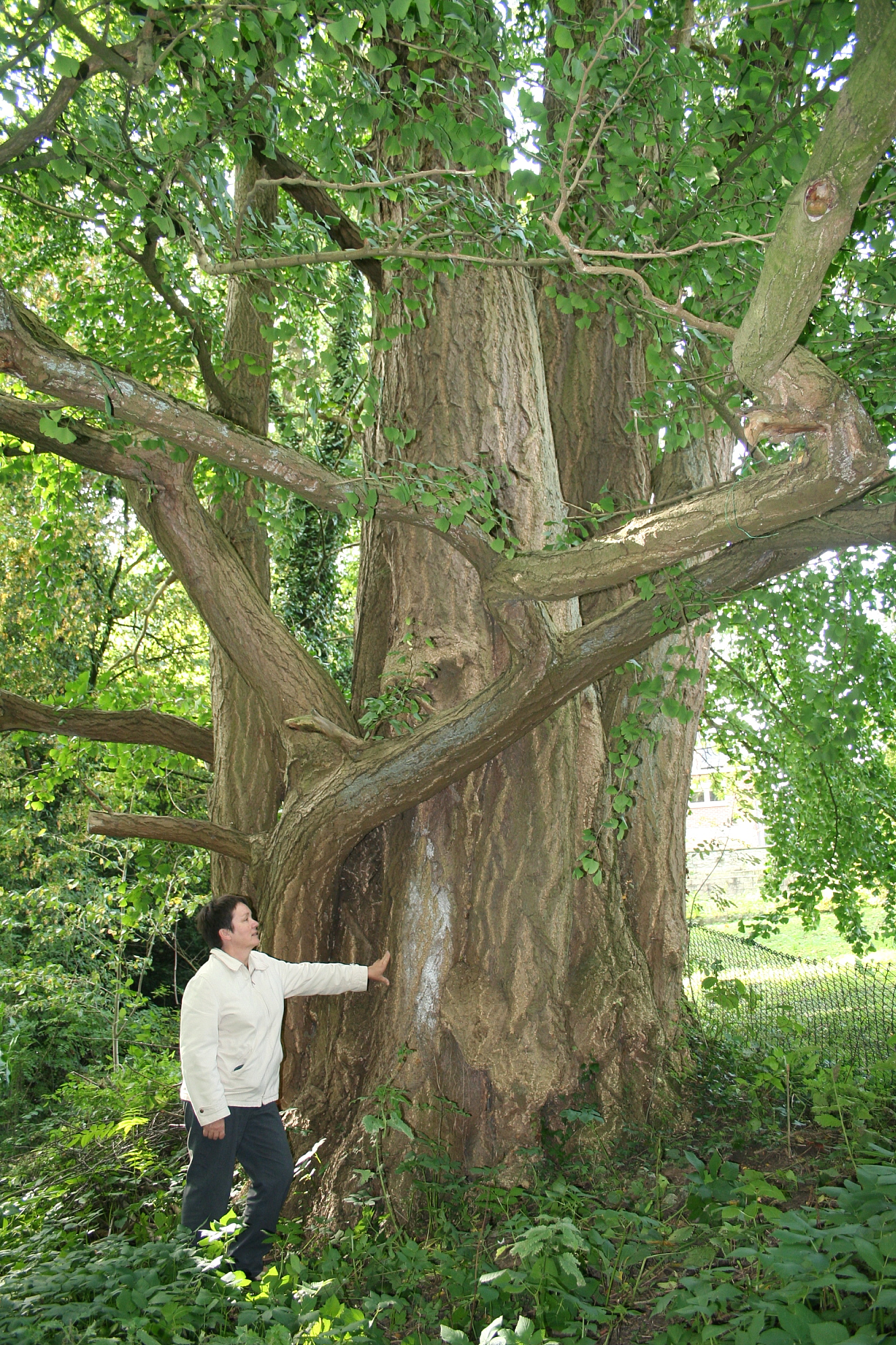
Trunk

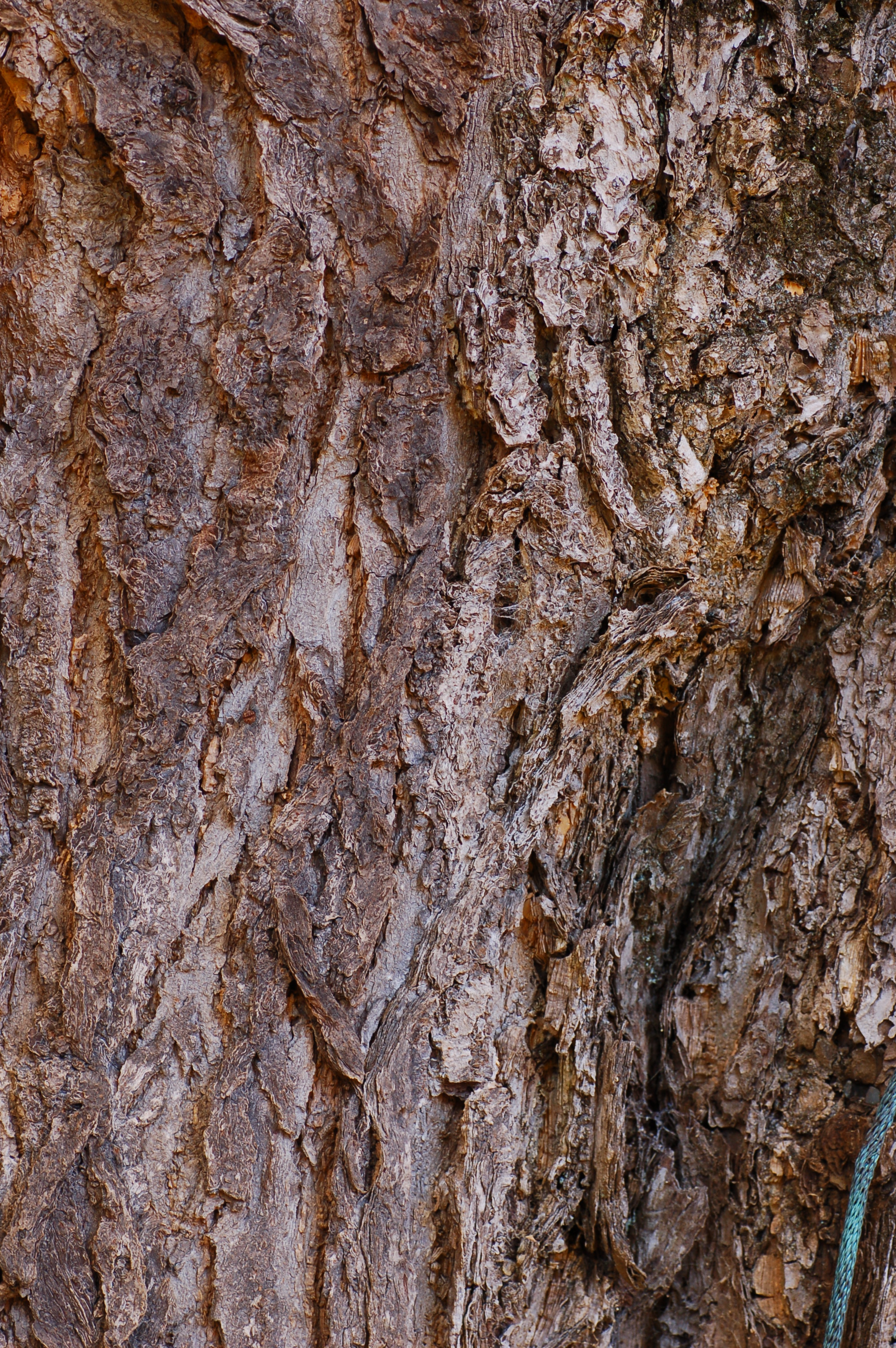
Bark

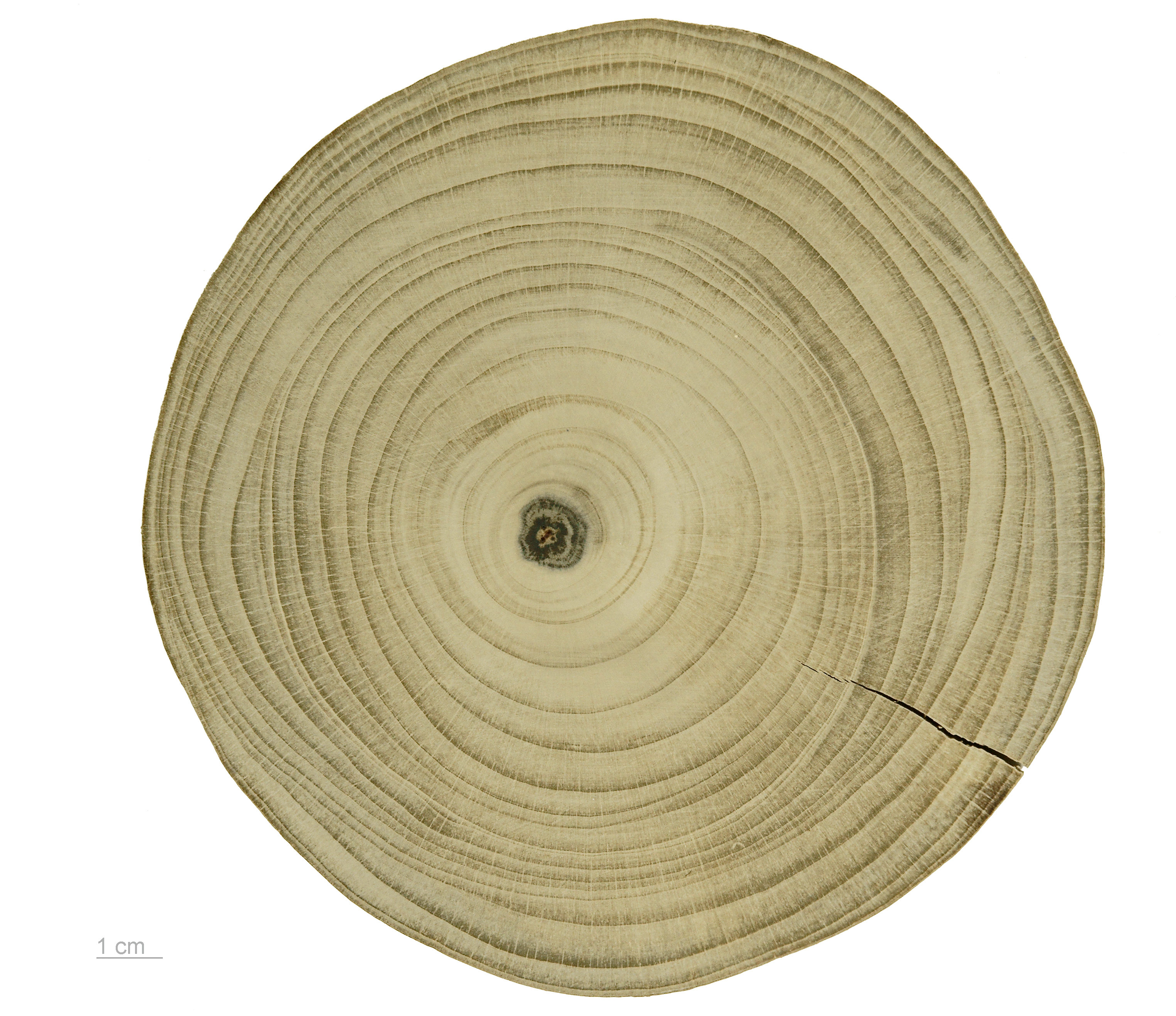
Trunk cross-section

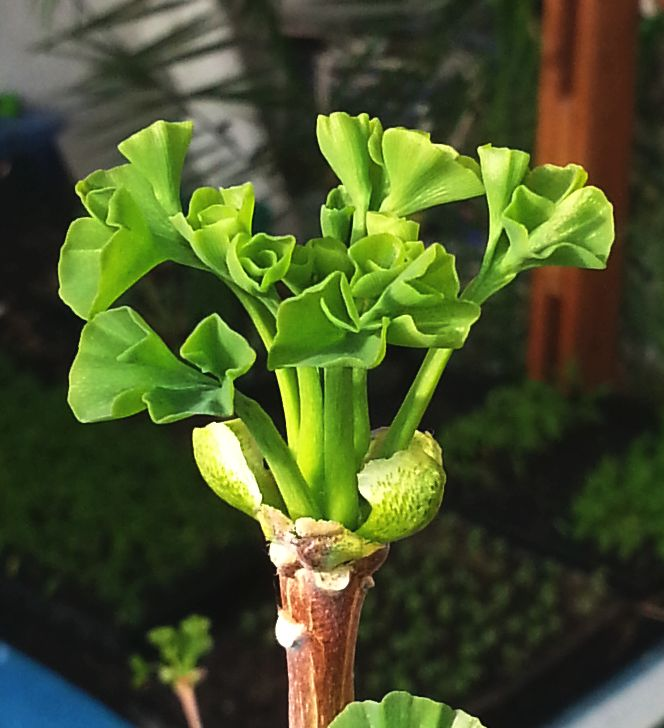
Bud in spring

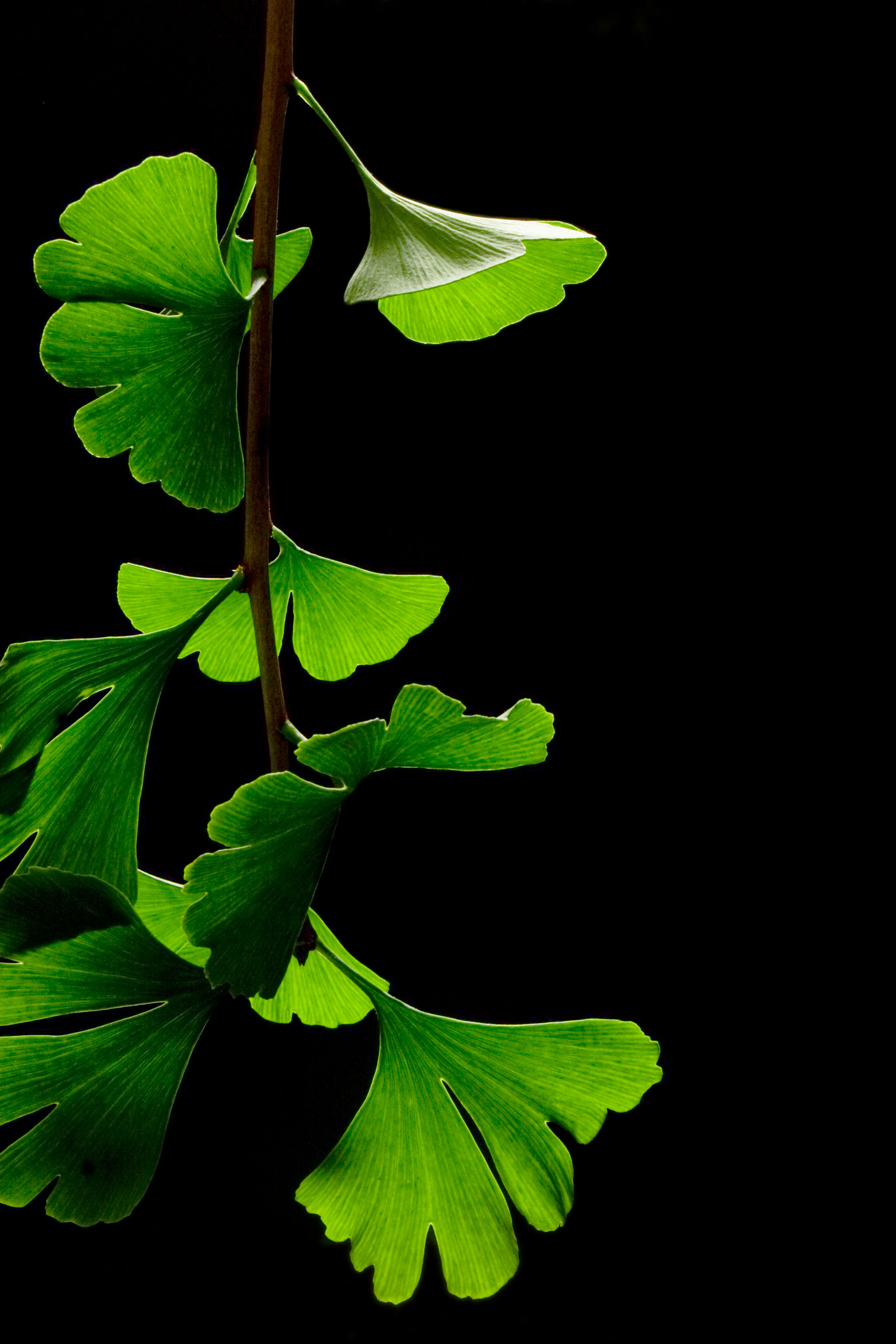
Leaves in summer

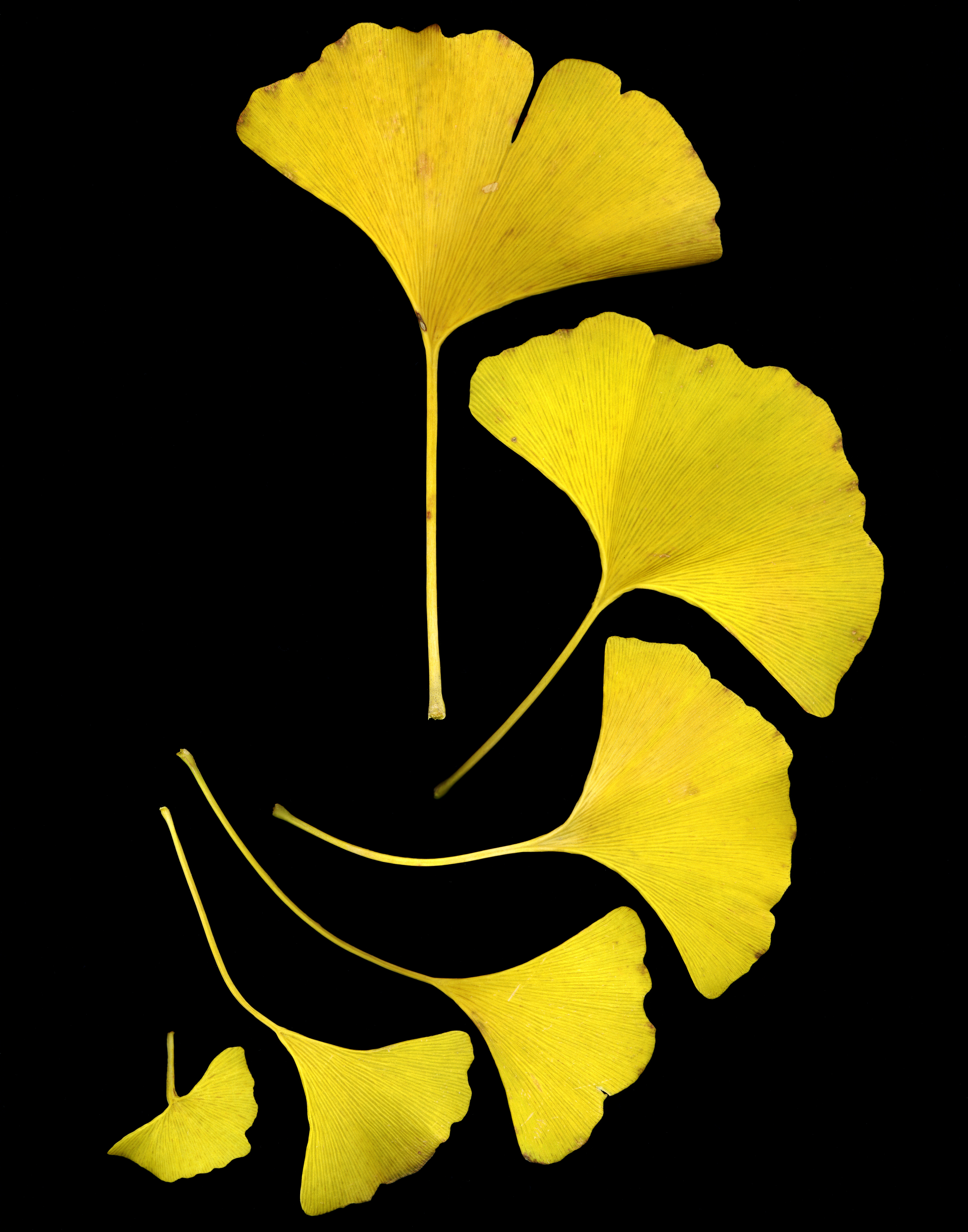
Leaves in autumn

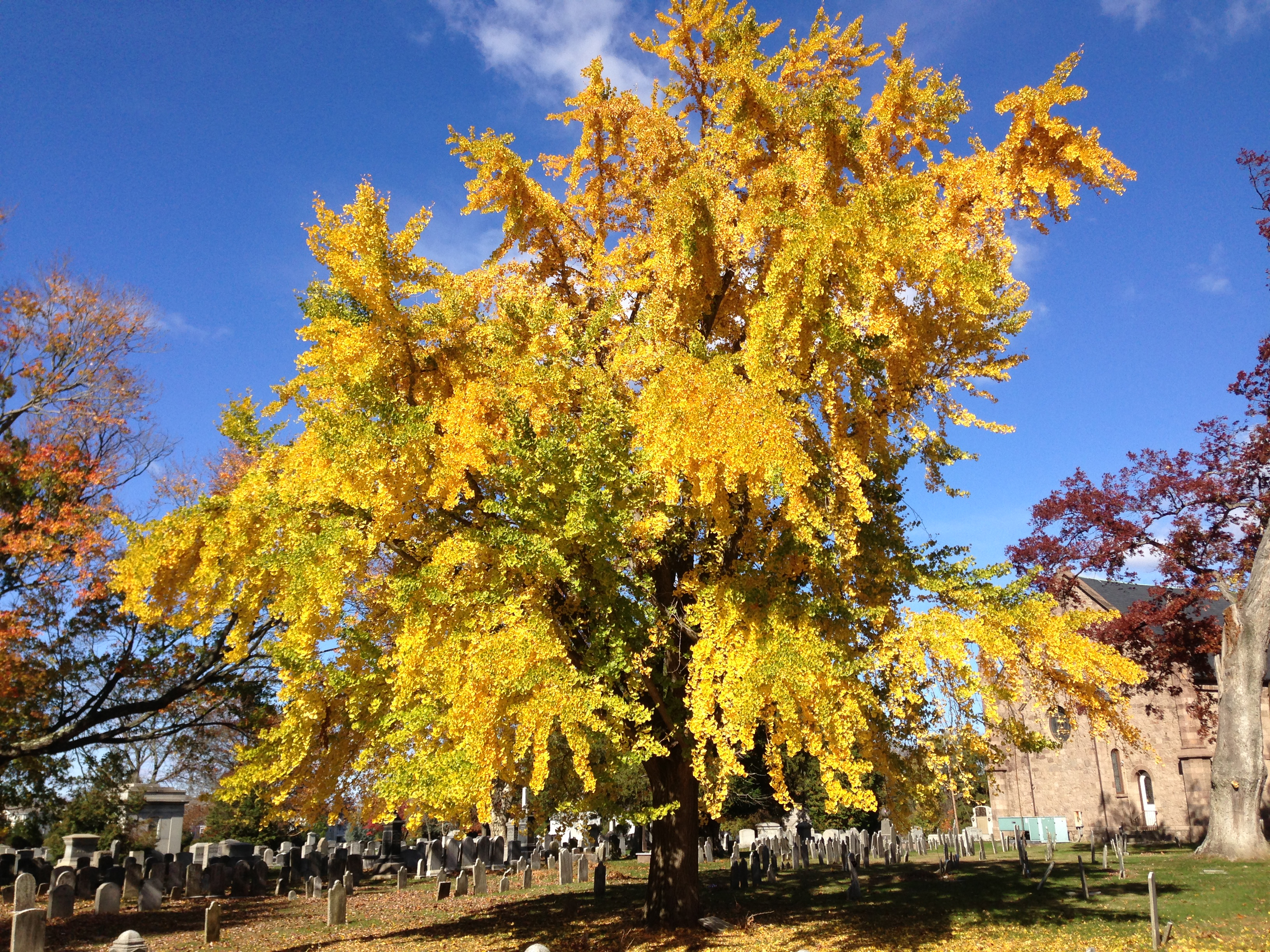
Tree in autumn

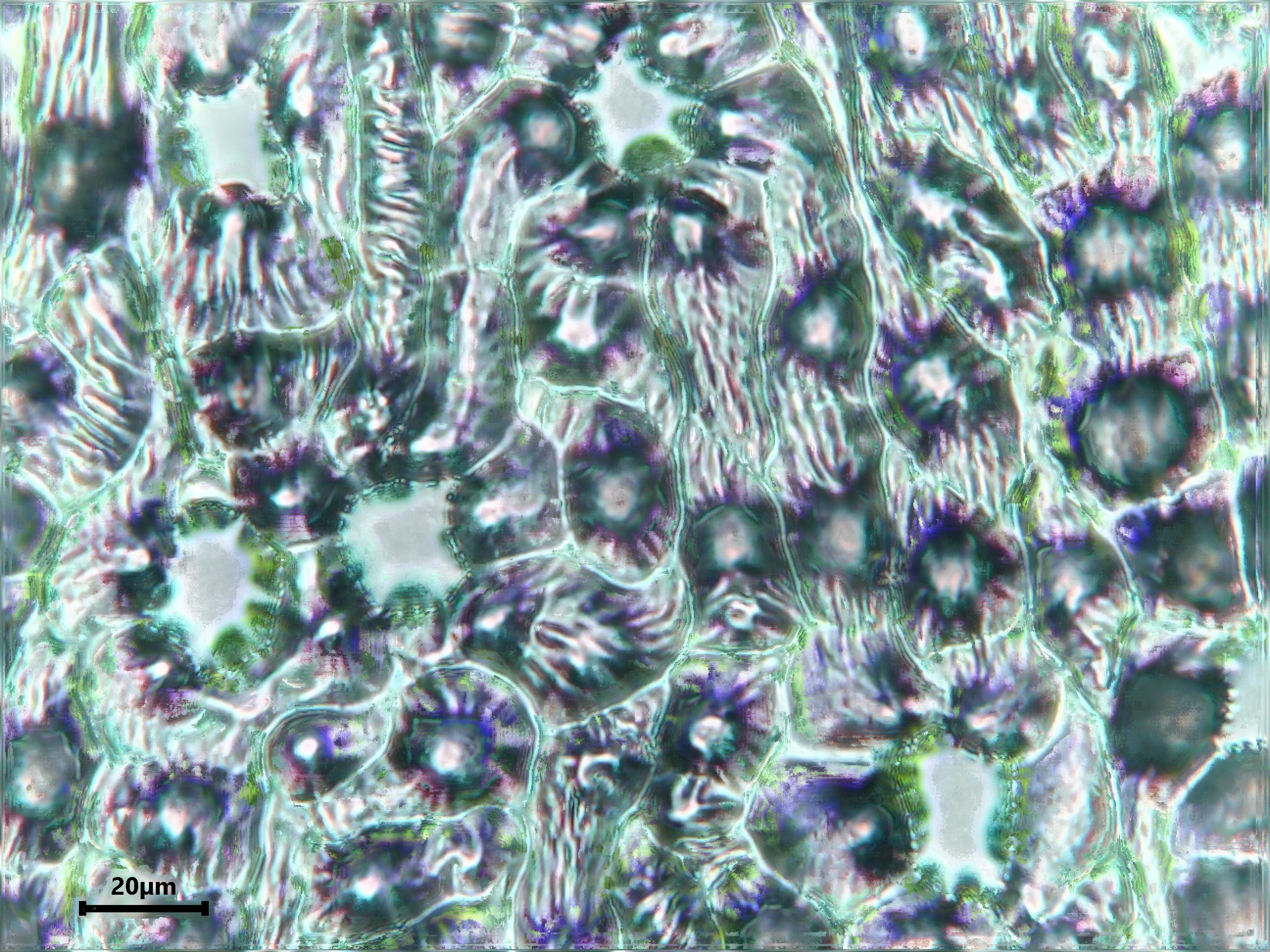
Leaf print showing sunken stomata on leaf underside

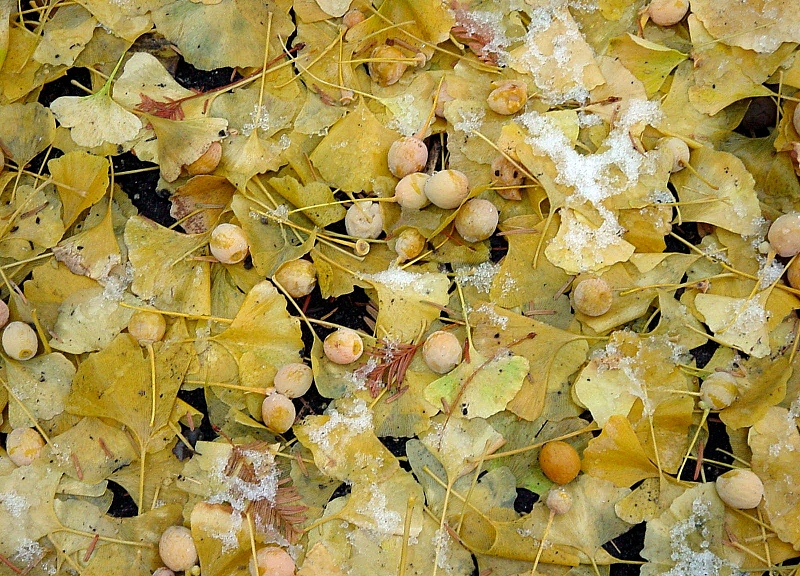
Autumn leaves and fallen seeds

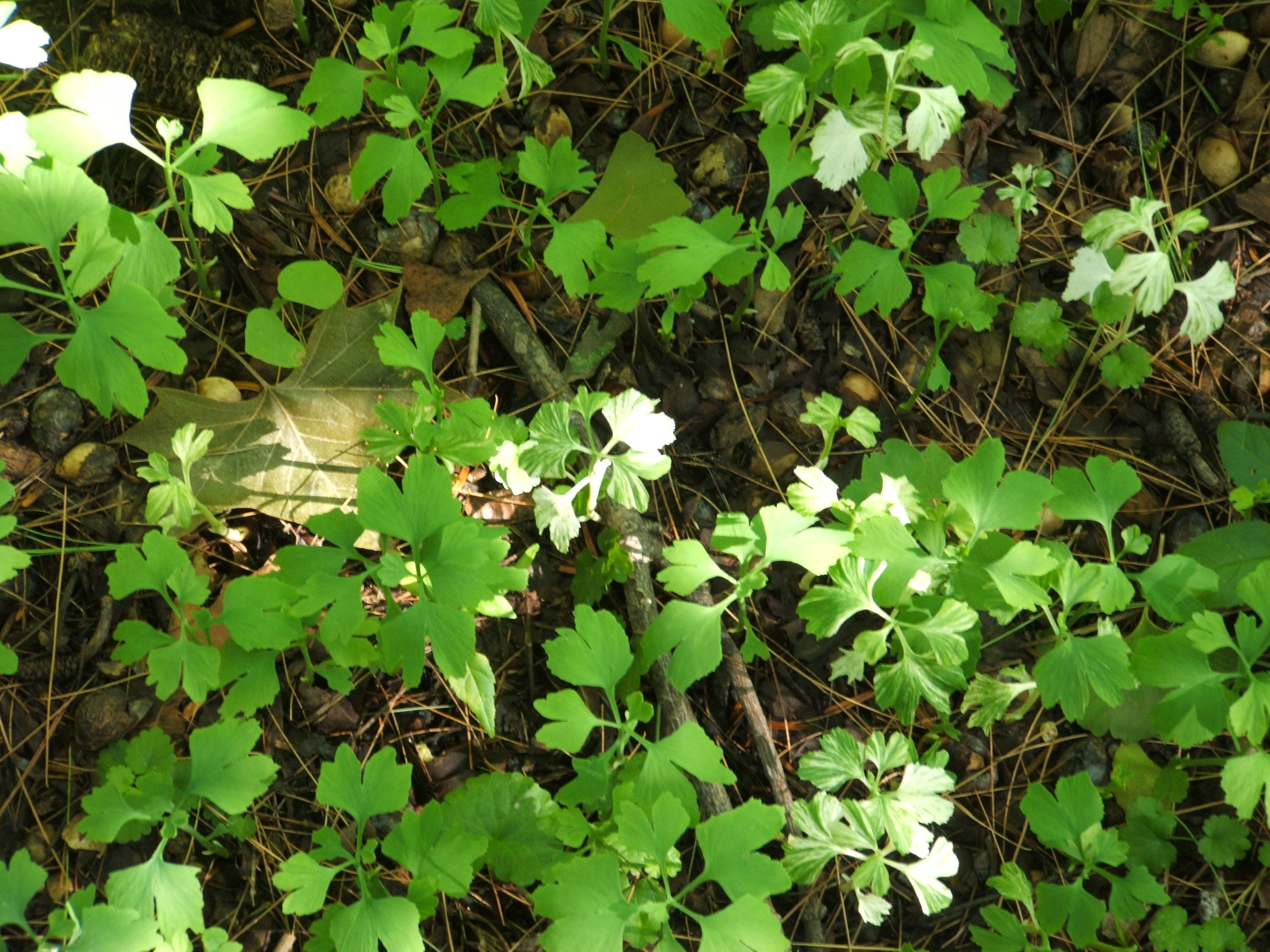
A forest of saplings sprout among last year's seeds

=== Leaves ===
The leaves are unique among seed plants, being fan-shaped with veins radiating out into the leaf blade, sometimes bifurcating (splitting), but never anastomosing to form a network. Two veins enter the leaf blade at the base and fork repeatedly in two; this is known as dichotomous venation. The leaves are usually 5–10 cm (2–4 in), but sometimes up to 15 cm (6 in) long. The old common name, maidenhair tree, derives from the leaves resembling pinnae of the maidenhair fern, Adiantum capillus-veneris. Ginkgos are prized for their autumn foliage, which is a deep saffron yellow.

The species is heterophyllous (two types of leaves); those on the long shoots are thicker, have higher rates of photosynthesis, higher vein density and leaf hydraulic conductance, while those on the short shoots are better at handling drought. Leaves of long shoots are also usually notched or lobed, but only from the outer surface, between the veins. They are borne both on the more rapidly growing branch tips, where they are alternate and spaced out, and also on the short, stubby spur shoots, where they are clustered at the tips. Leaves are green both on the top and bottom and have stomata on both sides. During autumn, the leaves turn a bright yellow and then fall, sometimes within a short space of time (one to fifteen days). Leaves of the cultivar 'Tubifolia' have funnel-shaped leaves.

=== Branches ===
Ginkgo branches grow in length by growth of shoots with regularly spaced leaves, as seen on most trees. From the axils of these leaves, "spur shoots" (also known as short shoots) develop on second-year growth. Short shoots have short internodes (they may grow only one to two centimeters in several years) and their leaves are usually unlobed. They are short and knobby, and are arranged regularly on the branches except on first-year growth. Because of the short internodes, leaves appear to be clustered at the tips of short shoots, and reproductive structures are formed only on them (seeds and leaves are visible on short shoots). In ginkgos, as in other plants that possess them, short shoots allow the formation of new leaves in the older parts of the crown. After a number of years, a short shoot may change into a long (ordinary) shoot, or vice versa.

Ginkgo prefers full sun and grows best in environments that are well-watered and well-drained. The species shows a preference for disturbed sites; in the "semiwild" stands at Tianmu Mountains, many specimens are found along stream banks, rocky slopes, and cliff edges. Accordingly, ginkgo retains a prodigious capacity for vegetative growth. It is capable of sprouting from embedded buds near the base of the trunk (lignotubers, or basal chichi) in response to disturbances, such as soil erosion. Old specimens are also capable of producing aerial roots on the undersides of large branches in response to disturbances such as crown damage; these roots can lead to successful clonal reproduction upon contacting the soil. These strategies are evidently important in the persistence of ginkgo; in a survey of the "semiwild" stands remaining in Tianmushan, 40% of the specimens surveyed were multi-stemmed, and few saplings were present.

=== Reproduction ===
Ginkgo biloba is dioecious, with separate sexes, some trees being female and others being male. Male plants produce small pollen cones with sporophylls, each bearing two microsporangia spirally arranged around a central axis. Sex conversion, wherein certain branches of a tree change sexes, has been observed. This phenomenon is difficult to research because of its rarity, as well as the practice of grafting female branches onto otherwise male trees that was common in 19th century Europe.

Fertilization of the ovule occurs through wind pollination, via motile sperm, as in cycads, ferns, mosses, and algae. The sperm are large (about 70–90 μm) and are similar to the sperm of cycads, which are slightly larger. Ginkgo sperm were first discovered by the Japanese botanist Sakugoro Hirase in 1896. The sperm have a complex multi-layered structure, which is a continuous belt of basal bodies that form the base of several thousand flagella which have a cilia-like motion. The flagella/cilia apparatus pulls the body of the sperm forwards. The sperm have only a tiny distance to travel to the archegonia, of which there are usually two or three. Two sperm are produced, one of which successfully fertilizes the ovule. Fertilization of ginkgo ovules, and development of the embryos, occurs just before or after they fall from the tree in early autumn.

After fertilization, one or both ovules develop into fruit-like structures containing seeds. The fruits are 1.5–2 cm (5/8–3/4 in) long, with a soft, fleshy, yellow-brown outer layer (the sarcotesta) that is attractive in appearance, but contains butyric acid (also known as butanoic acid) and smells foul like rancid butter or vomit when fallen. Ginkgo seed stalks are as long as its leaf stalks, with 1–2 seeds at their tips. Ripe seeds shed with autumn leaves, or may persist a little longer. Beneath the sarcotesta is the hard sclerotesta (the "shell" of the seed) and a papery endotesta, with the nucellus surrounding the female gametophyte at the center.

Despite its perception by humans as foul, the fruit's odor is attractive to certain small mammals that eat the fruit and disperse the seeds: these include the gray squirrel and, in East Asia, the palm civet and raccoon dog. The sclerotesta resists digestion, and so the seeds are passed intact into feces, which thus provide a dispersal mechanism.

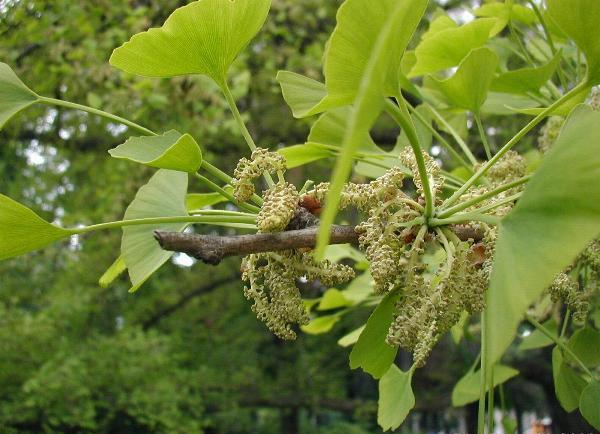
Pollen cones on branch

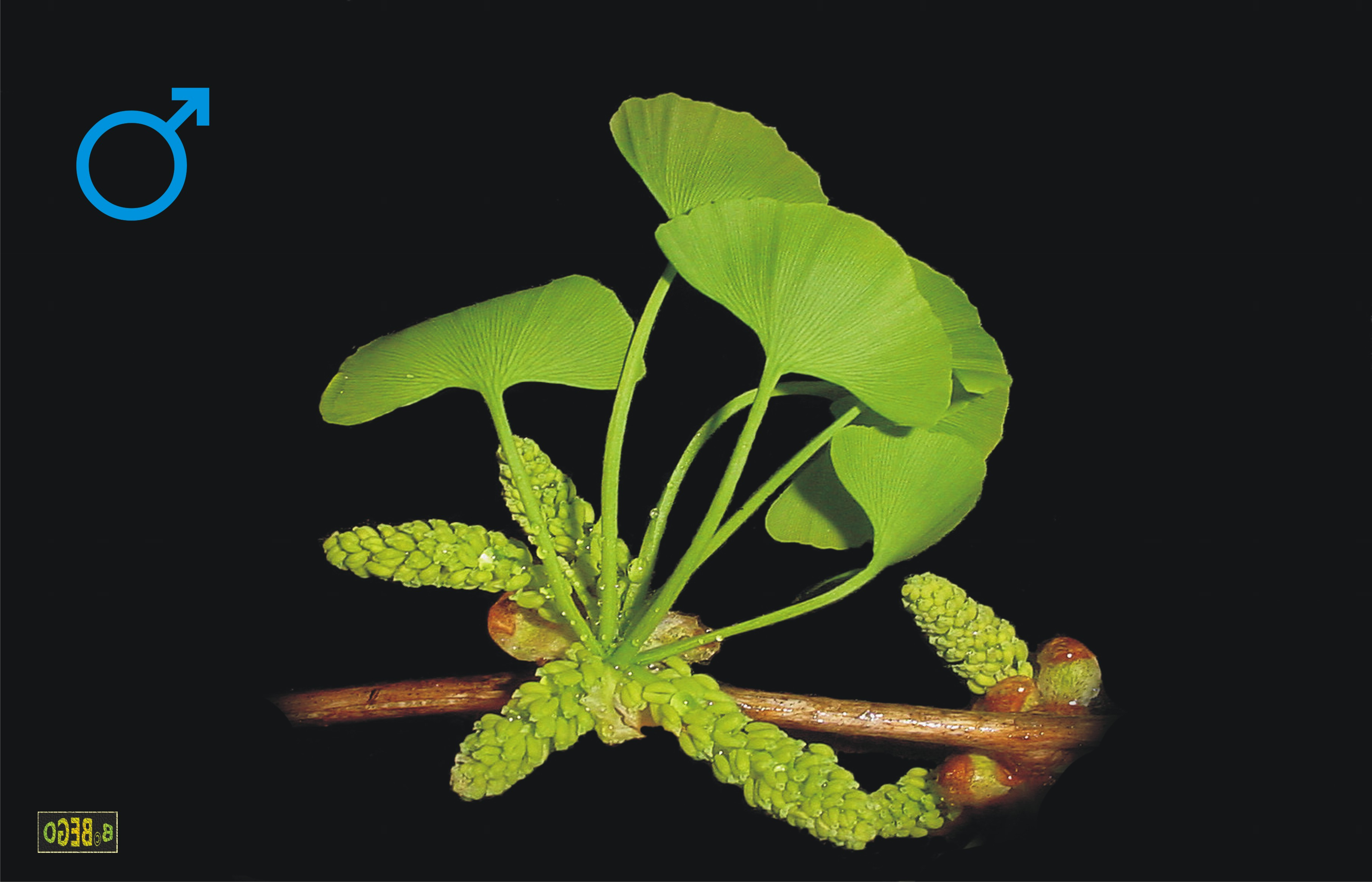
Pollen cones

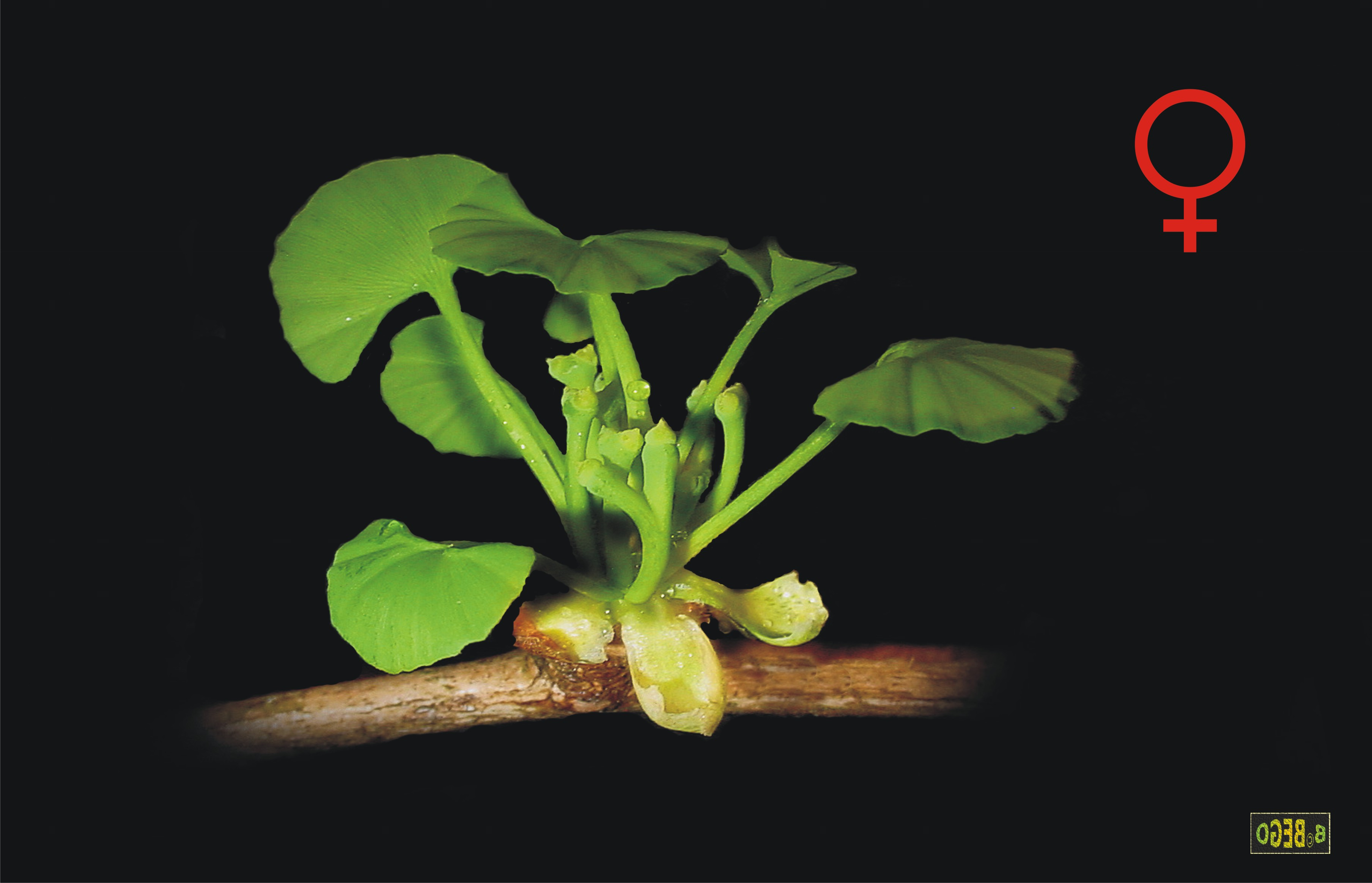
Ovules

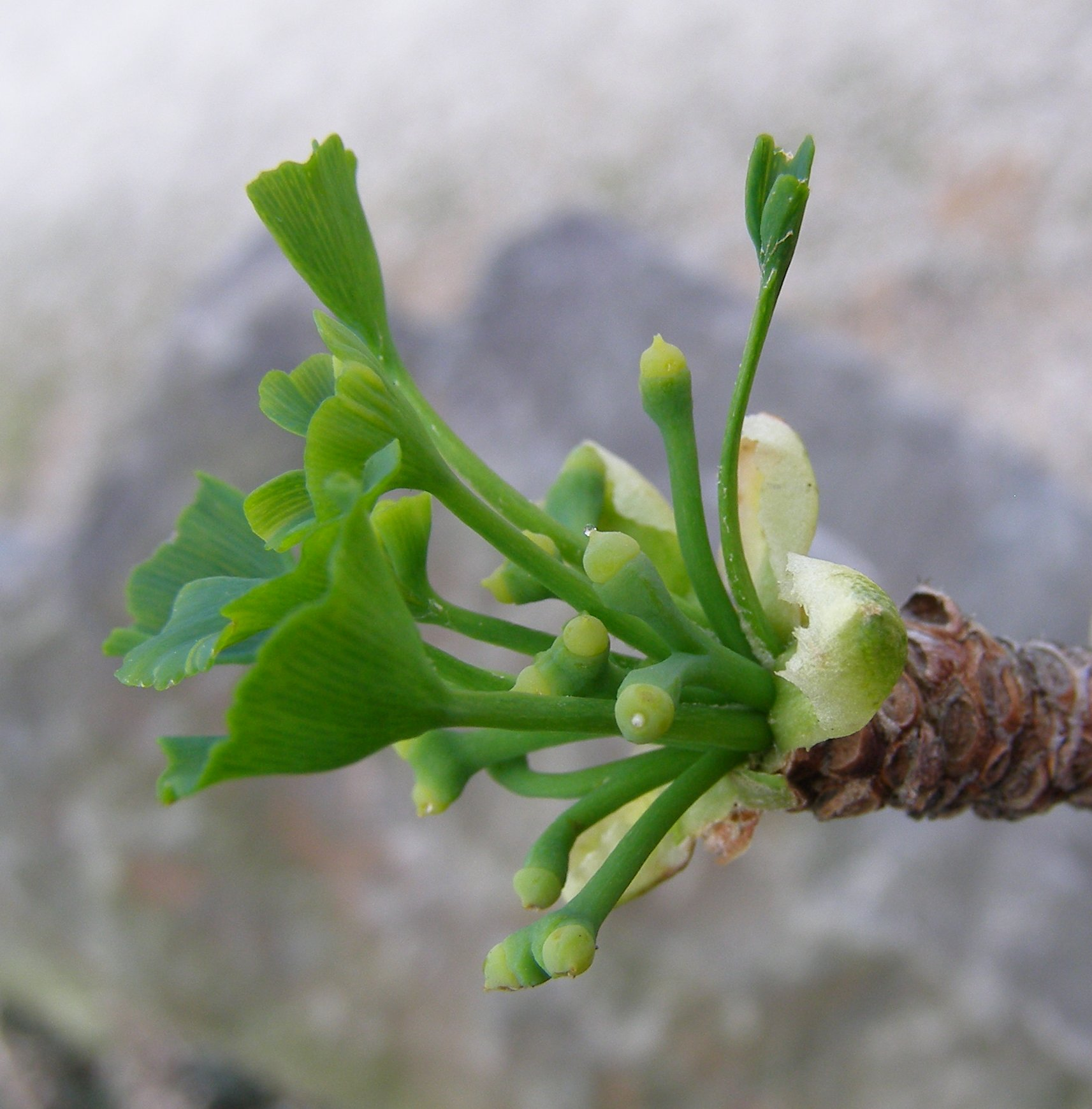
Ovules ready for fertilization

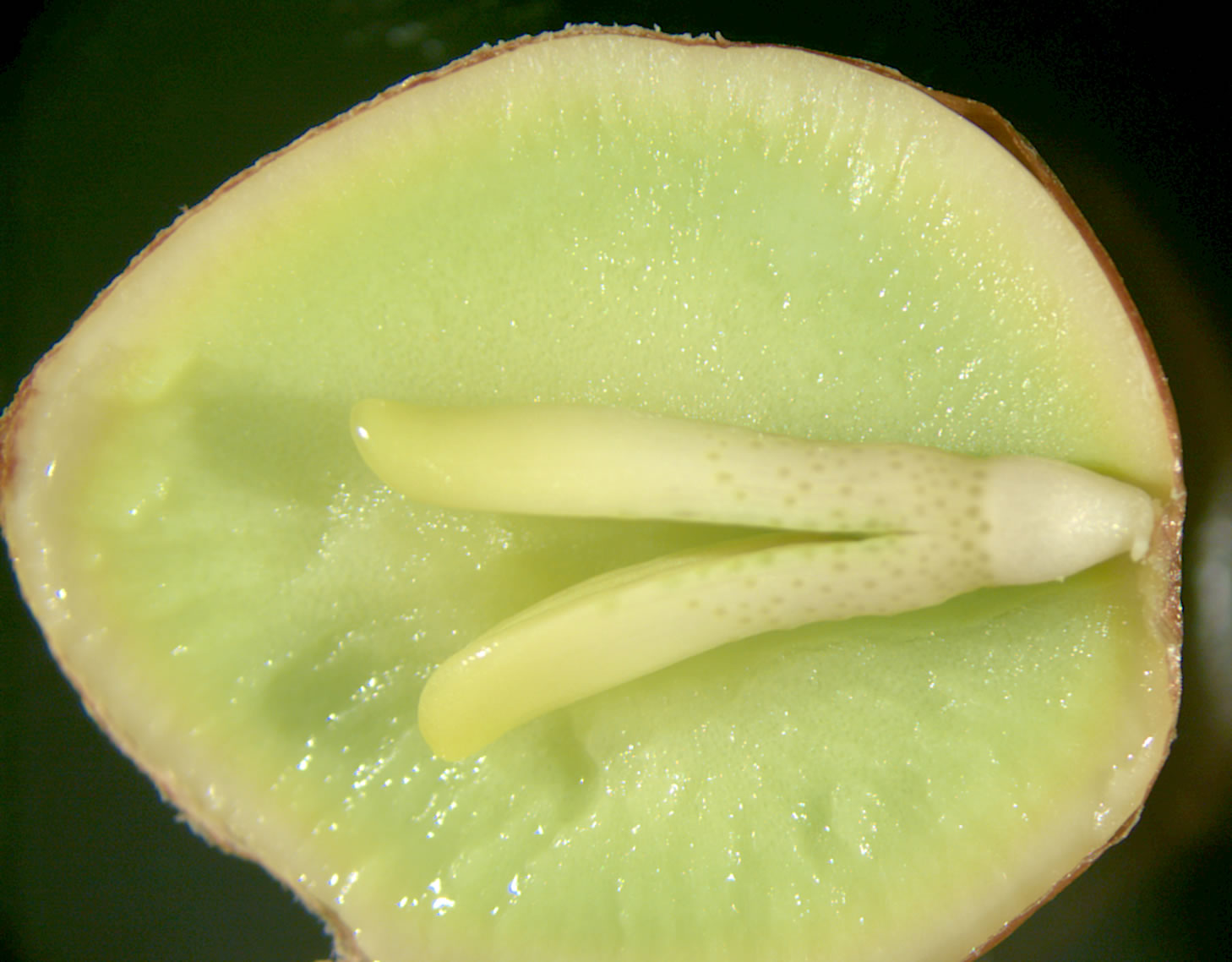
Female gametophyte with a well-developed embryo

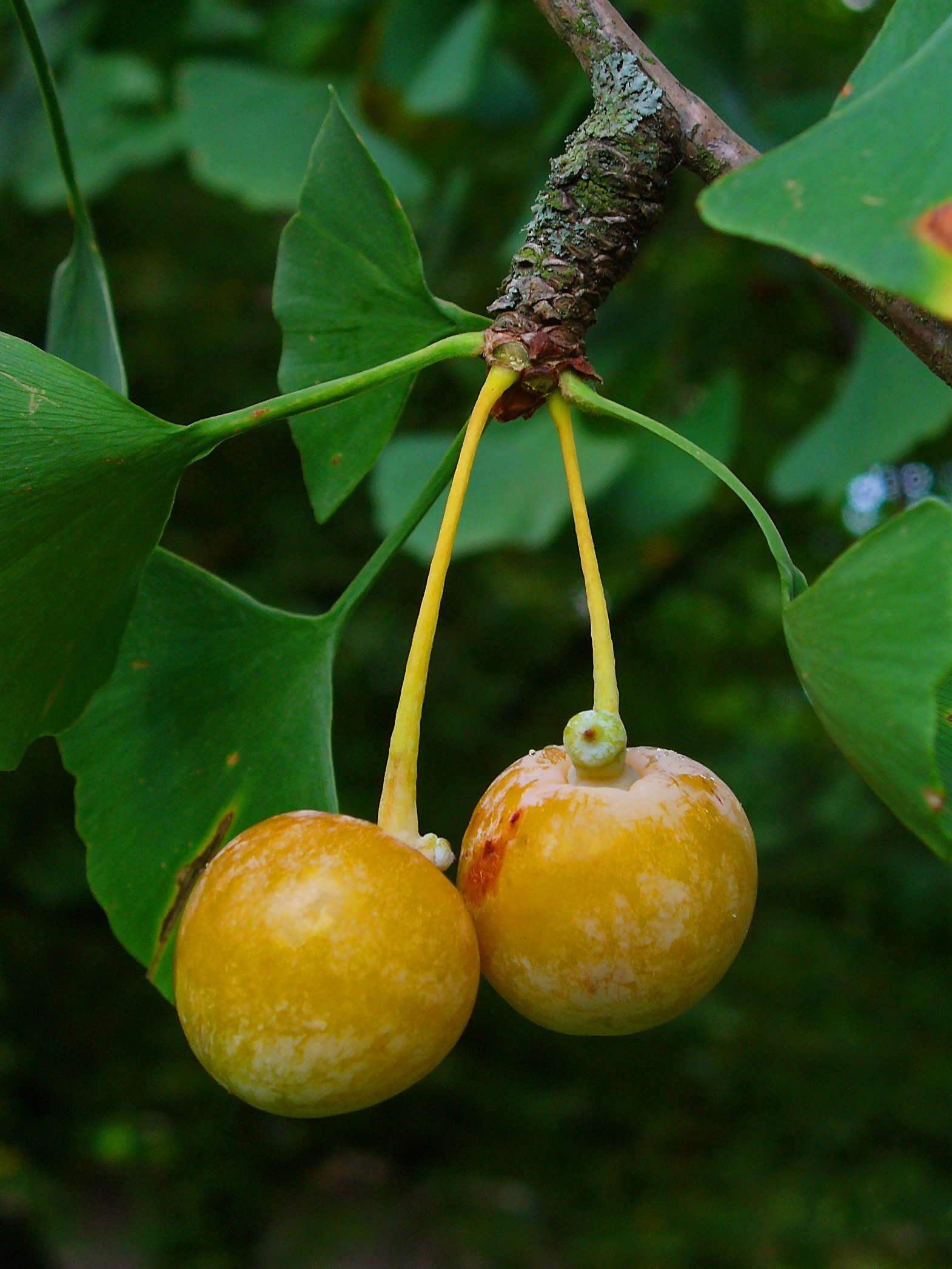
Ripe, fruit-like sarcotestae (fleshy seedcoats)

=== Genome ===
Chinese scientists published a draft genome of Ginkgo biloba in 2016. The tree has a large genome of 10.6 billion DNA nucleobase "letters" (the human genome has three billion) and about 41,840 predicted genes which enable a considerable number of antibacterial and chemical defense mechanisms. 76.58% of the assembled sequence turned out to be repetitive sequences.

In 2020, a study in China of ginkgo trees up to 667 years old showed little effects of aging, finding that the trees continued to grow with age and displayed no genetic evidence of senescence, and continued to make phytochemicals indefinitely.

=== Phytochemicals ===
Extracts of ginkgo leaves contain phenolic acids, proanthocyanidins, flavonoid glycosides, such as myricetin, kaempferol, isorhamnetin, and quercetin, and the terpene trilactones ginkgolides and bilobalides. The leaves also contain unique ginkgo biflavones, alkylphenols, and polyprenols.

== Taxonomy ==
Carl Linnaeus described the species in 1771, the specific epithet biloba derived from the Latin bis, "twice" and loba, "lobed", referring to the shape of the leaves. Two names for the species recognise the botanist Richard Salisbury, a placement by Nelson as Pterophyllus salisburiensis and the earlier Salisburia adiantifolia proposed by James Edward Smith. The epithet of the latter may have been intended to denote a characteristic resembling Adiantum, the genus of maidenhair ferns.

The generic name Ginkgo can be traced to recordings done by Engelbert Kaempfer, the first Westerner to investigate the species in 1690 in Nagasaki, for the Amoenitates Exoticae (1712): it is regarded as a mistranscription of Japanese 銀杏 ginkyō ([ɡiŋkʲoː]). Taking his spelling of other Japanese words containing the syllable [kʲoː] (present romanization: kyō) into account, an expected transcription would have been "ginkio" or "ginkjo". Thus, his curious "–kgo" spelling has long been considered to be an error Kaempfer made in his notes, but Nagata et al. showed that it was the spelling of his interpreter, Genemon Imamura, who spoke the local Nagasaki dialect. Linnaeus adopted the ginkgo spelling based on Kaempfer's compilation of Japanese flora in Amoenitates while writing Mantissa plantarum II (Amoenitates Exoticae, p. 811) thus becoming the tree's generic name. Kaempfer's drawing can be found in Hori's article. The kanji phrase 銀杏 ginkyō meaning 'silver apricot' had been attested in Chinese herbology literature such as 日用本草 (Daily Use Materia Medica) (1329) and Compendium of Materia Medica 本草綱目 published in 1578; 銀杏 was particular terminology used during the Song dynasty for tributary reasons in place of the then contemporary 鴨脚 ("duckfeet", from its leaves) in northeast China where it commonly grew. The older Chinese name for this plant is 銀果, meaning "silver fruit", pronounced yínguǒ in Mandarin or ngan-gwo in Cantonese, the current commonly used names are 白果 (bái guǒ) meaning 'white fruit'.

Despite its spelling based on this complicated etymology, "ginkgo" is usually pronounced /ˈɡɪŋkoʊ/, which has given rise to the common alternative spelling "gingko". The spelling pronunciation /ˈɡɪŋkɡoʊ/ is also documented in some dictionaries.

=== Classification ===
The relationship of ginkgo to other plant groups remains uncertain. It has been placed loosely in the divisions Spermatophyta and Pinophyta, but no consensus has been reached. Since its seeds are not protected by an ovary wall, it can morphologically be considered a gymnosperm. The apricot-like structures produced by female ginkgo trees are technically not fruits, but are seeds that have a shell consisting of a soft and fleshy section (the sarcotesta), and a hard section (the sclerotesta). The sarcotesta has a strong smell that most people find unpleasant.

The ginkgo is classified in its own division, the Ginkgophyta, comprising the single class Ginkgoopsida, order Ginkgoales, family Ginkgoaceae, genus Ginkgo and is the only extant species within this group. It is one of the best-known examples of a living fossil, because Ginkgoales other than G. biloba are not known from the fossil record after the Pliocene.

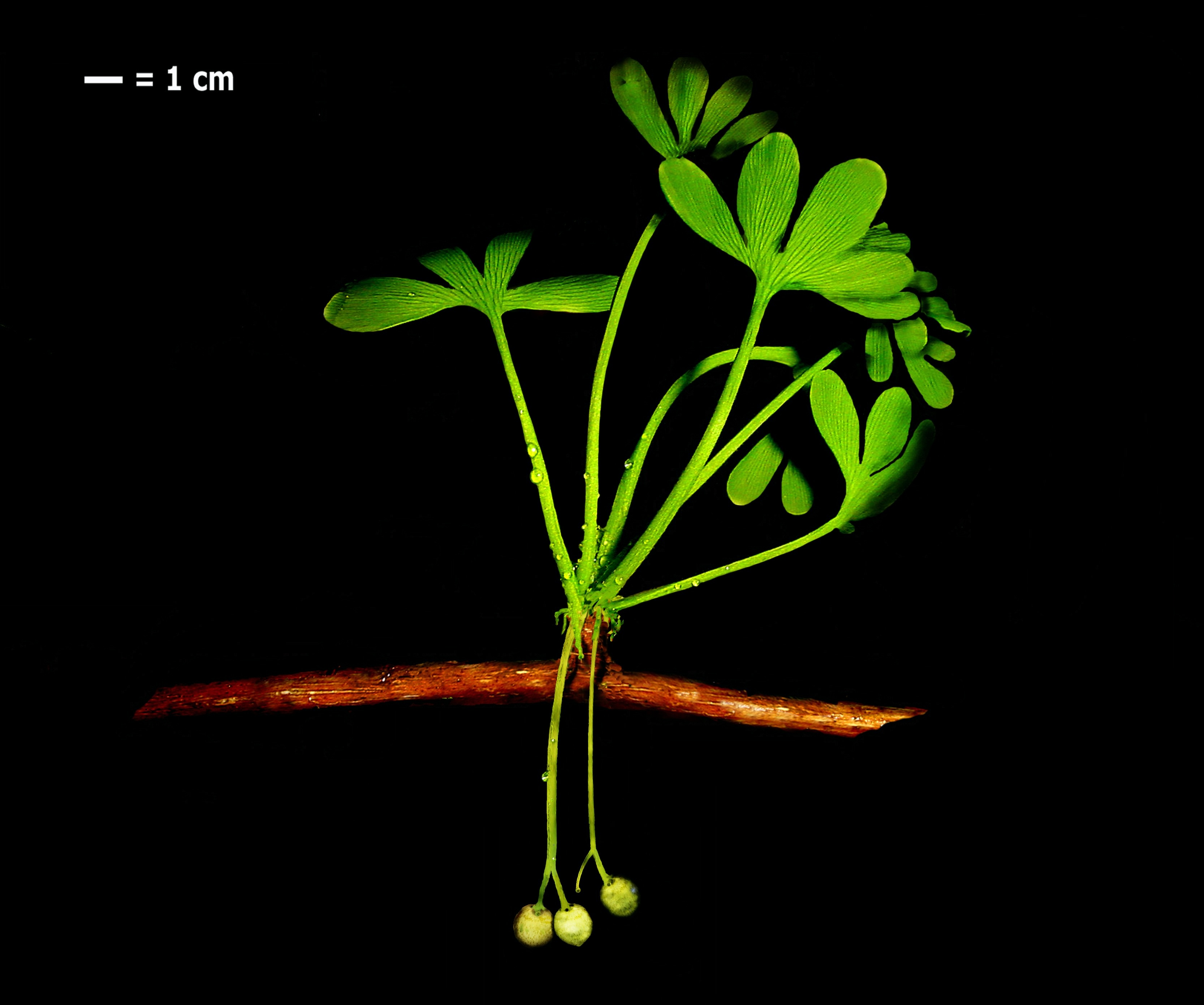
Extinct Ginkgo yimaensis

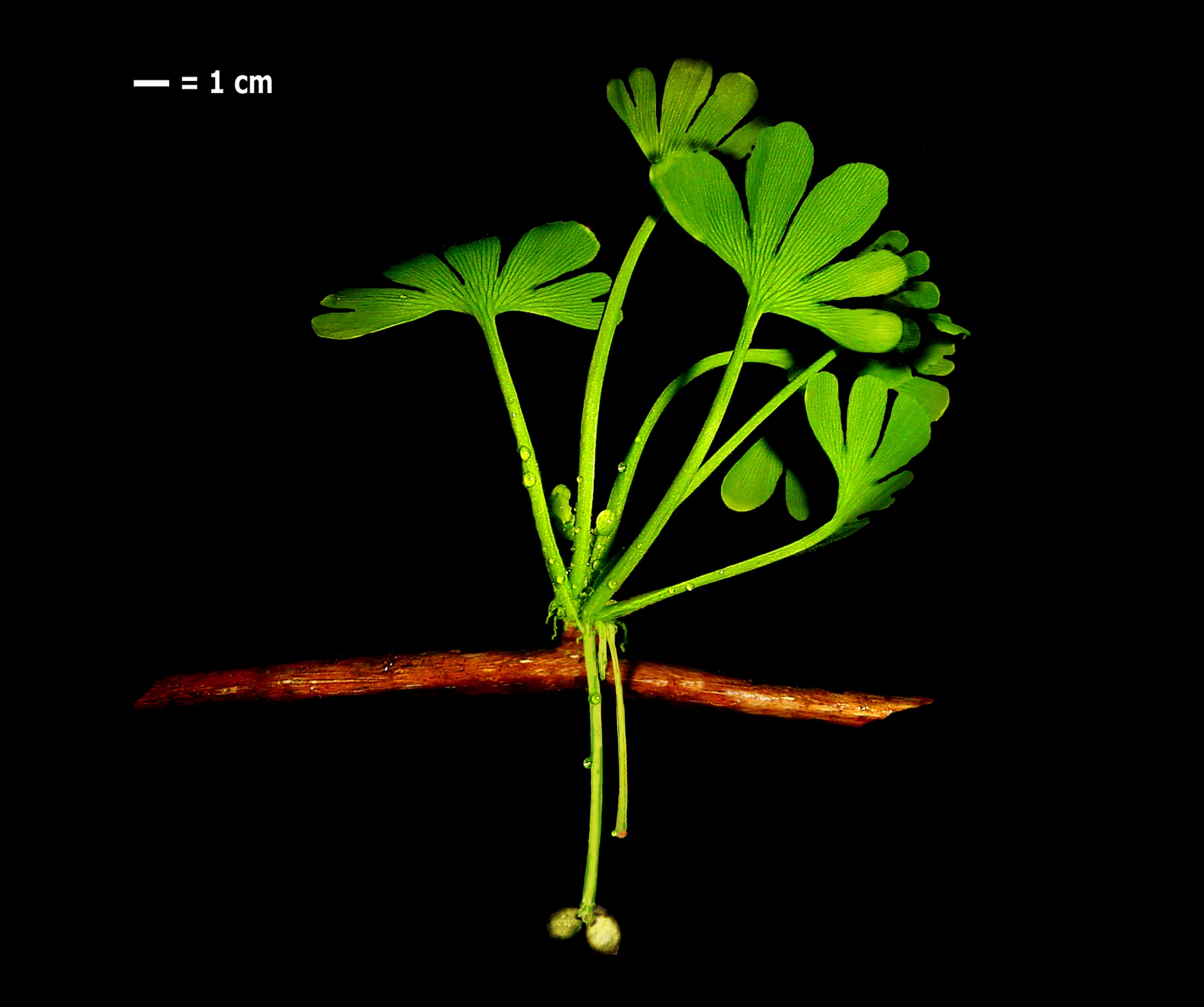
Extinct G. apodes

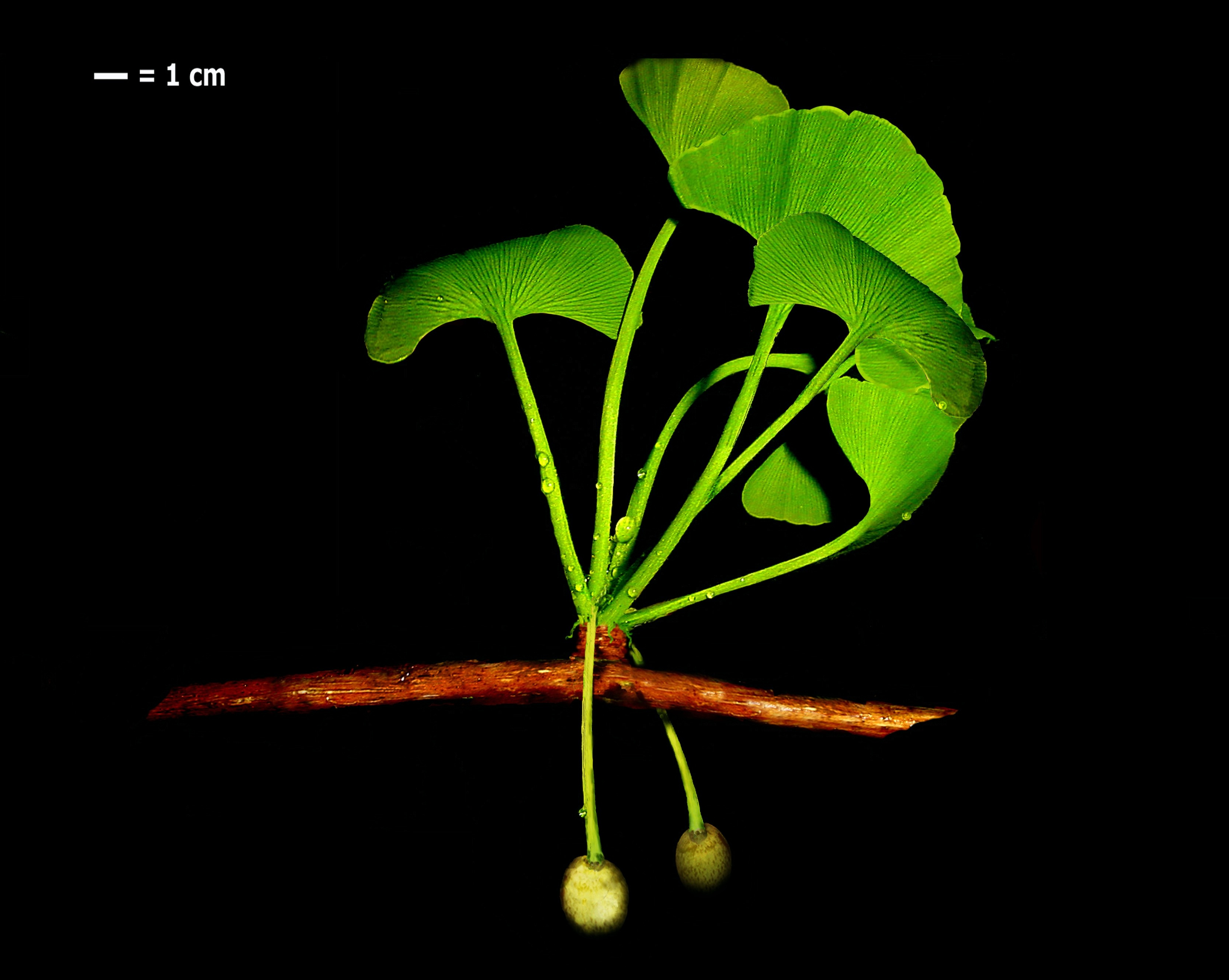
Extinct Ginkgo adiantoides, or possibly a new US taxon, G. cranei

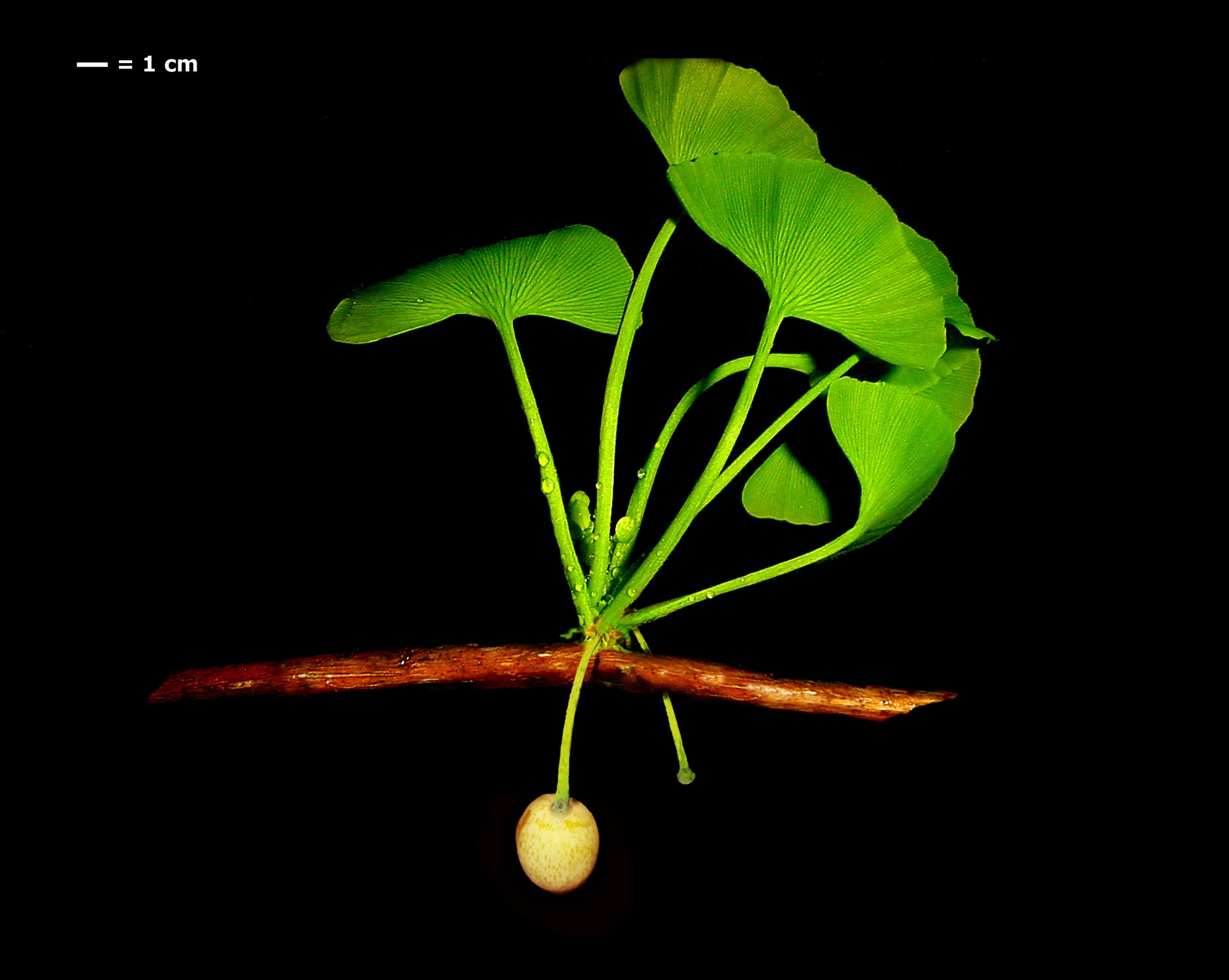
Extant G. biloba

=== Phylogeny ===
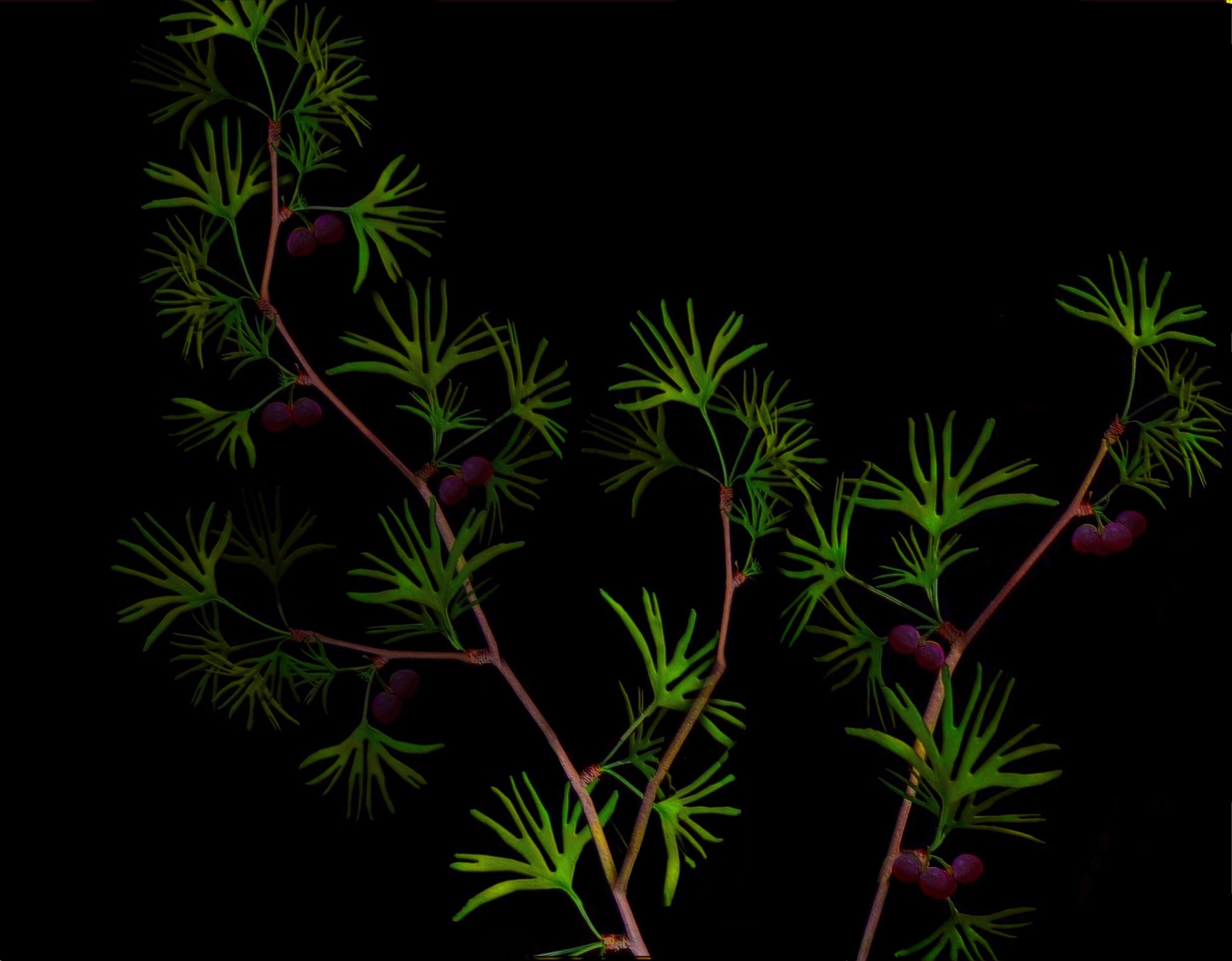
A digital recreation of Baiera made from diverse images of fossils and academic descriptions

Ginkgo biloba is a living fossil, with fossils recognisably related to modern ginkgo from the early Permian (Cisuralian), with likely oldest record being that of Trichopitys from the earliest Permian (Asselian) of France, over 290 million years old. The closest living relatives of the clade are the cycads, which share with the extant G. biloba the characteristic of motile sperm.

Such plants with leaves that have more than four veins per segment have customarily been assigned to the taxon Ginkgo, while the taxon Baiera is used to classify those with fewer than four veins per segment. Sphenobaiera has been used for plants with a broadly wedge-shaped leaf that lacks a distinct leaf stem.

==== Rise and decline ====
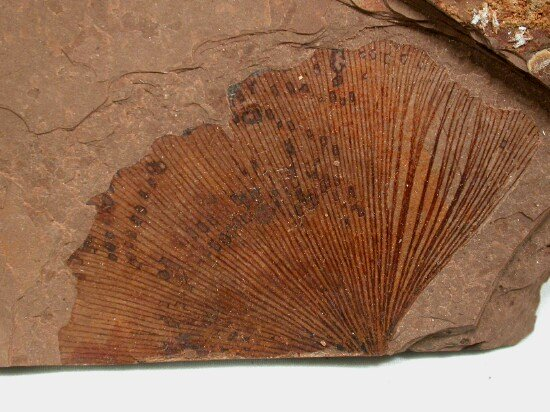
Ginkgo biloba leaf from the Eocene epoch from the McAbee Fossil Beds, British Columbia

Fossils attributable to the genus Ginkgo first appeared in the Middle Jurassic. The genus Ginkgo diversified and spread throughout Laurasia during the Jurassic and Early Cretaceous.

The Ginkgophyta declined in diversity as the Cretaceous progressed, and by the Paleocene, Ginkgo adiantoides was the only Ginkgo species left in the Northern Hemisphere, while a markedly different (and poorly documented) form persisted in the Southern Hemisphere. Along with that of ferns, cycads, and cycadeoids, the species diversity in the genus Ginkgo drops through the Cretaceous, at the same time the flowering plants were on the rise; this supports the hypothesis that, over time, flowering plants with better adaptations to disturbance displaced Ginkgo and its associates.

At the end of the Pliocene, Ginkgo fossils disappeared from the fossil record everywhere except in a small area of central China, where the modern species survived.

==== Limited number of species ====
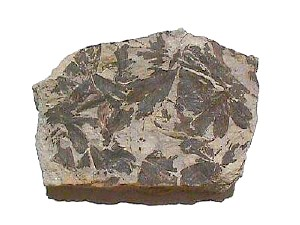
Fossil Ginkgo leaves from a Jurassic period formation in Scarborough, UK

It is doubtful whether the Northern Hemisphere fossil species of Ginkgo can be reliably distinguished. Given the slow pace of evolution and morphological similarity between members of the genus, there may have been only one or two species existing in the Northern Hemisphere through the entirety of the Cenozoic: present-day G. biloba (including G. adiantoides) and G. gardneri from the Paleocene of Scotland.

At least morphologically, G. gardneri and the Southern Hemisphere species are the only known post-Jurassic taxa that can be unequivocally recognised. The remainder may have been ecotypes or subspecies. The implications would be that G. biloba had occurred over an extremely wide range, had remarkable genetic flexibility and, though evolving genetically, never showed much speciation.

While it may seem improbable that a single species may exist as a contiguous entity for many millions of years, many of the ginkgo's life-history parameters fit: Extreme longevity; slow reproduction rate; (in Cenozoic and later times) a wide, apparently contiguous, but steadily contracting distribution; and (as far as can be demonstrated from the fossil record) extreme ecological conservatism (restriction to disturbed streamside environments).

==== Adaptation to a single environment ====
Given the slow rate of evolution of the genus, Ginkgo possibly represents a pre-angiosperm strategy for survival in disturbed streamside environments. Ginkgo evolved in an era before flowering plants, when ferns, cycads, and cycadeoids dominated disturbed streamside environments, forming low, open, shrubby canopies. Ginkgo's large seeds and habit of "bolting" – growing to a height of 10 meters before elongating its side branches – may be adaptations to such an environment.

Modern-day G. biloba grows best in environments that are well-watered and drained, and the extremely similar fossil Ginkgo favored similar environments: The sediment record at the majority of fossil Ginkgo localities indicates it grew primarily in disturbed environments, such as along streams. Ginkgo, therefore, presents an "ecological paradox" because while it possesses some favorable traits for living in disturbed environments (clonal reproduction) many of its other life-history traits are the opposite of those exhibited by modern plants that thrive in disturbed settings (slow growth, large seed size, late reproductive maturity).

== Distribution and habitat ==
Although Ginkgo biloba and other species of the genus were once widespread throughout the world, its habitat had shrunk by two million years ago.

For centuries, it was thought to be extinct in the wild, but is now a common tree cultivated throughout eastern China, Korea, and Japan. Many municipalities in China, Korea and Japan use ginkgos as street trees, and ginkgo leaves are the emblem of prominent educational institutions such as the University of Tokyo and Sungkyunkwan University in South Korea. Despite their widespread habitat, high genetic uniformity exists among ginkgo trees, with some Chinese scholars suggesting that ginkgo trees in these areas may have been planted and preserved by Chinese monks over about 1,000 years. A study demonstrates a greater genetic diversity in Southwestern China populations, supporting glacial refugia in mountains surrounding the eastern Tibetan Plateau, where several old-growth candidates for wild populations have been reported. Whether native ginkgo populations still exist has not been demonstrated unequivocally, but there is genetic evidence that these Southwestern populations may be wild, as well as evidence that the largest and oldest G. biloba trees may be older than surrounding human settlements.

Where it occurs in the wild, Ginkgo is found infrequently in deciduous forests and valleys on acidic loess (i.e. fine, silty soil) with good drainage. The soil it inhabits is typically in the pH range of 5.0 to 5.5. While cultivated specimens can survive in a variety of environments (such as a subtropical climate), the wild ginkgo is native to areas with a mostly temperate climate.

== Ecology ==
Ginkgo biloba is the only vascular plant known to host a microalga, a Cocomyxa-like green alga, as an endosymbiont. This symbiosis is vertically inherited and present worldwide. The endosymbiont has been found in ginkgos in Asia, North America, and Europe. Photosynthetic activity does not occur as the algae are hosted intracellularly in an immature "precursor" form without a functional chloroplast. The endosymbiotic algae may be involved in metabolic pathways of the ginkgo host.

== Cultivation ==
Ginkgo has long been cultivated in China. It is common in the southern third of the country. Some planted trees at temples are believed to be over 1,500 years old. The first record of Europeans encountering it is in 1690 in Japanese temple gardens, where the tree was seen by the German botanist Engelbert Kaempfer. Because of its status in Buddhism and Confucianism, the ginkgo has also been widely planted in Korea and in Japan since the 14th century; in both areas, some naturalization has occurred, with ginkgos seeding into natural forests. Ginkgo has been commonly cultivated in North America for over 200 years and in Europe for close to 300, but during that time, it has never become significantly naturalized.

G. biloba is also commonly manually planted in cities across the United States and Europe. This species is highly tolerant to pollution and serves as a visually appealing, shade-providing tree in many cities and gardens.

Many intentionally planted ginkgos are male cultivars grafted onto plants propagated from seed, because the male trees will not produce the malodorous seeds. The popular cultivar 'Autumn Gold' is a clone of a male plant.

The disadvantage of male Ginkgo biloba trees is that their pollen is highly allergenic. They have an OPALS (Ogren Plant Allergy Scale) rating of 7 (out of 10), whereas female trees, which can produce no pollen, have an OPALS allergy scale rating of 2.

Female cultivars include 'Liberty Splendor', 'Santa Cruz', and 'Golden Girl', the latter so named because of the striking yellow color of its leaves in the fall; all female cultivars release zero pollen.

Many cultivars are listed in the literature in the UK, of which the compact 'Troll' has gained the Royal Horticultural Society's Award of Garden Merit.

Ginkgos adapt well to the urban environment, tolerating pollution and confined soil spaces. They rarely have disease problems, even in urban conditions, and are attacked by few insects.

Ginkgos are popular subjects for growing as miniature landscapes known as penjing and bonsai; they can be kept artificially small and tended over centuries. The trees are easy to propagate from seed.

=== Hiroshima ===
Extreme examples of the ginkgo's tenacity may be seen in Hiroshima, Japan, where six trees growing between 1 and 2 kilometres (1/2 and 1 1/4 miles) from the 1945 atom bomb explosion were among the few living organisms in the area to survive the blast. Although almost all other plants (and animals) in the area were killed, the ginkgos, though charred, survived and were soon healthy again, among other hibakujumoku (trees that survived the blast).

The six trees are still alive. They are marked with signs at Housenbou (報専坊) temple (planted in 1850), Shukkei-en (planted about 1740), Jōsei-ji (planted 1900), at the former site of Senda Elementary School near Miyukibashi, at the Myōjōin temple, and an Edo period-cutting at Anraku-ji temple.

=== 1000-year-old ginkgo at Tsurugaoka Hachimangū ===
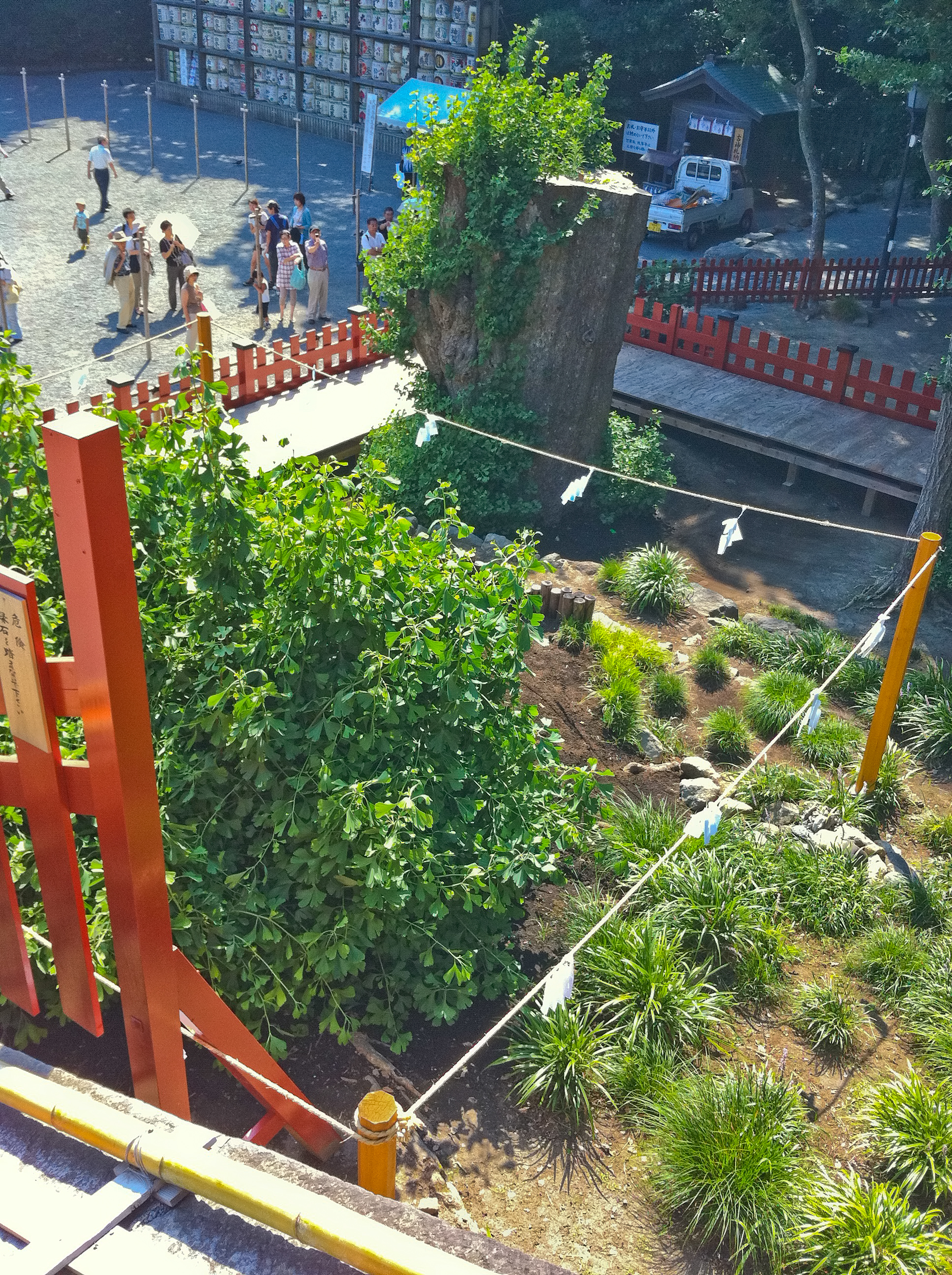
The stump of the ancient fallen ginkgo which has produced new shoots in 30 days

At the Tsurugaoka Hachiman-gū's shrine in the city of Kamakura, Kanagawa Prefecture, Japan, an ancient ginkgo tree stands beside the stone entry staircase. According to legend, the tree has stood there since the founding of the shrine circa 1063. The tree is nicknamed kakure-ichō (hiding ginkgo), because of an Edo period legend in which shōgun Minamoto no Sanetomo was assassinated in 1219 by his nephew, Kugyō, who had hidden behind the tree to ambush the shōgun.

Modern scholarship has established that ginkgos arrived from China in the 14th century, and a 1990 tree-ring measurement indicated the kakure-ichō's age to be about 500 years.

On 10 March 2010, the tree blew down in a storm, but the stump has since sprouted vigorously.

=== 1,400-year-old ginkgo tree at Gu Guanyin ===
The grounds of the Buddhist temple at Gu Guanyin in the Zhongnan Mountains feature a ginkgo tree reputed to be 1,400 years old. The tree itself is a popular tourist attraction.

== Toxicity ==
Since 2016, G. biloba extract is classified as a possible human carcinogen (group 2B) by the International Agency for Research on Cancer.

When eaten in large quantities or over a long period, the seeds may cause poisoning by ginkgotoxin (4'-O-methylpyridoxine, MPN), as found in a few case reports. A heat-stable compound not destroyed by cooking, MPN may cause convulsions, which were alleviated by treatment with pyridoxine phosphate (vitamin B6), according to limited studies.

Some people are sensitive to the chemicals in the sarcotesta, the outer fleshy coating. These people should handle the seeds with care, wearing disposable gloves, when preparing them for consumption. The symptoms are allergic contact dermatitis, or blisters similar to that caused by contact with poison ivy.

Side effects of using ginkgo supplements may include increased risk of bleeding, gastrointestinal discomfort, nausea, vomiting, diarrhea, headaches, dizziness, heart palpitations, and restlessness. Although use of standardized Ginkgo biloba leaf extracts in moderate amounts appears to be safe, excessive use may have undesirable effects, especially in terms of drug interactions. The dosing of anticoagulants, such as warfarin or antiplatelet medication, may be adversely affected by using ginkgo supplements.

According to a systematic review, the effects of ginkgo on pregnant women may include increased bleeding time, and there is inadequate information about safety during lactation.

Ginkgo pollen may produce allergic reactions. G. biloba leaves and sarcotesta contain ginkgolic acids – which are highly allergenic – long-chain alkylphenols, such as bilobol or adipostatin A (bilobol is a substance related to anacardic acid from cashew nut shells and urushiols present in poison ivy and other Toxicodendron spp.) Individuals with a history of strong allergic reactions to poison ivy, mangoes, cashews and other alkylphenol-producing plants are more likely to experience an allergic reaction when consuming non-standardized ginkgo-containing preparations. The level of these allergens in standardized pharmaceutical preparations from Ginkgo biloba was restricted to 5 ppm by the Commission E of the former Federal German Health Authority. Overconsumption of seeds from Ginkgo biloba can deplete vitamin B_{6}.

== Uses ==
The wood is used to make furniture, chessboards, carving, and casks for making saké; it is fire-resistant and slow to decay.

=== Culinary ===
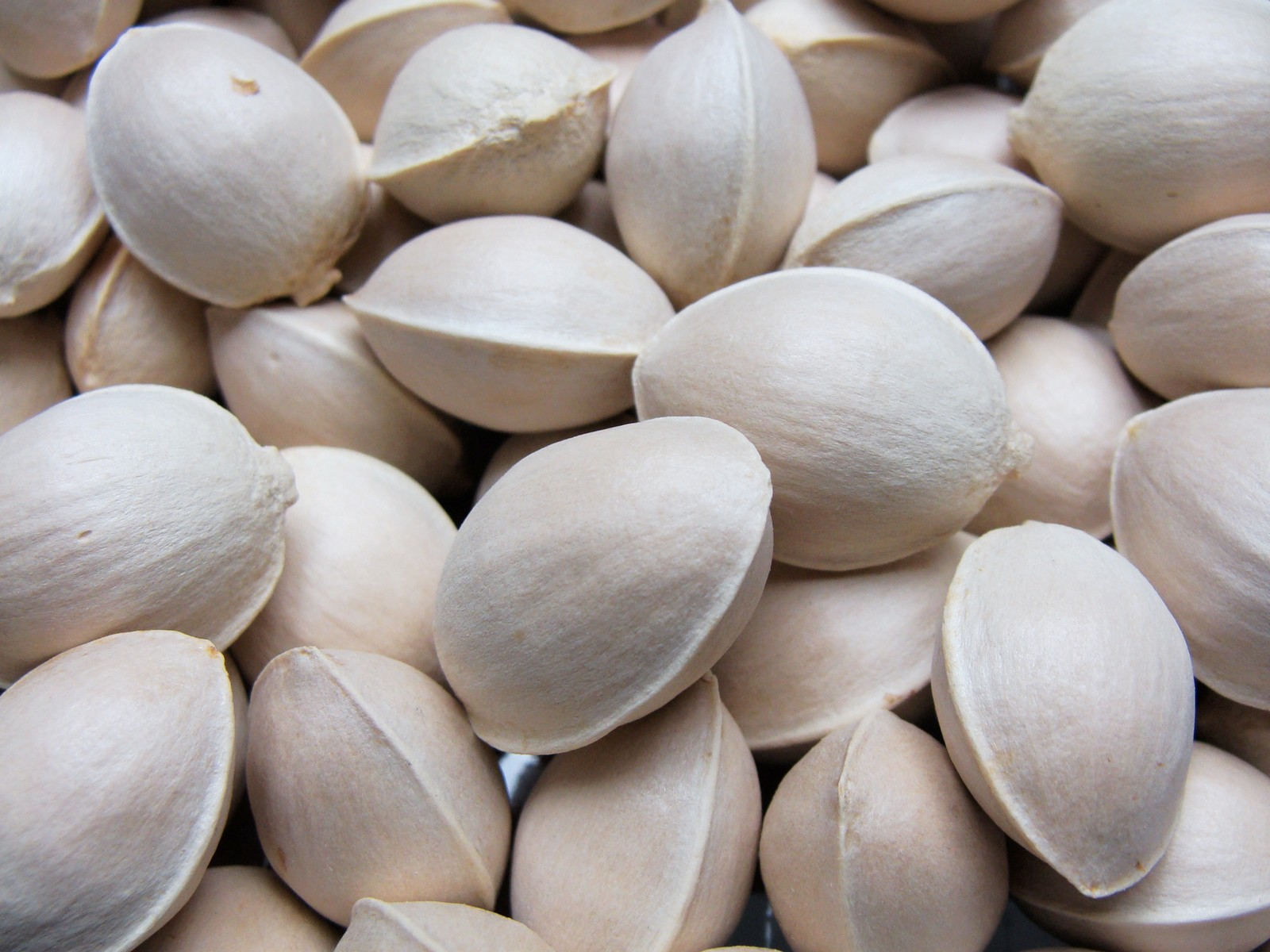
Ginkgo 'seeds' (sclerotestae) with sarcotesta removed

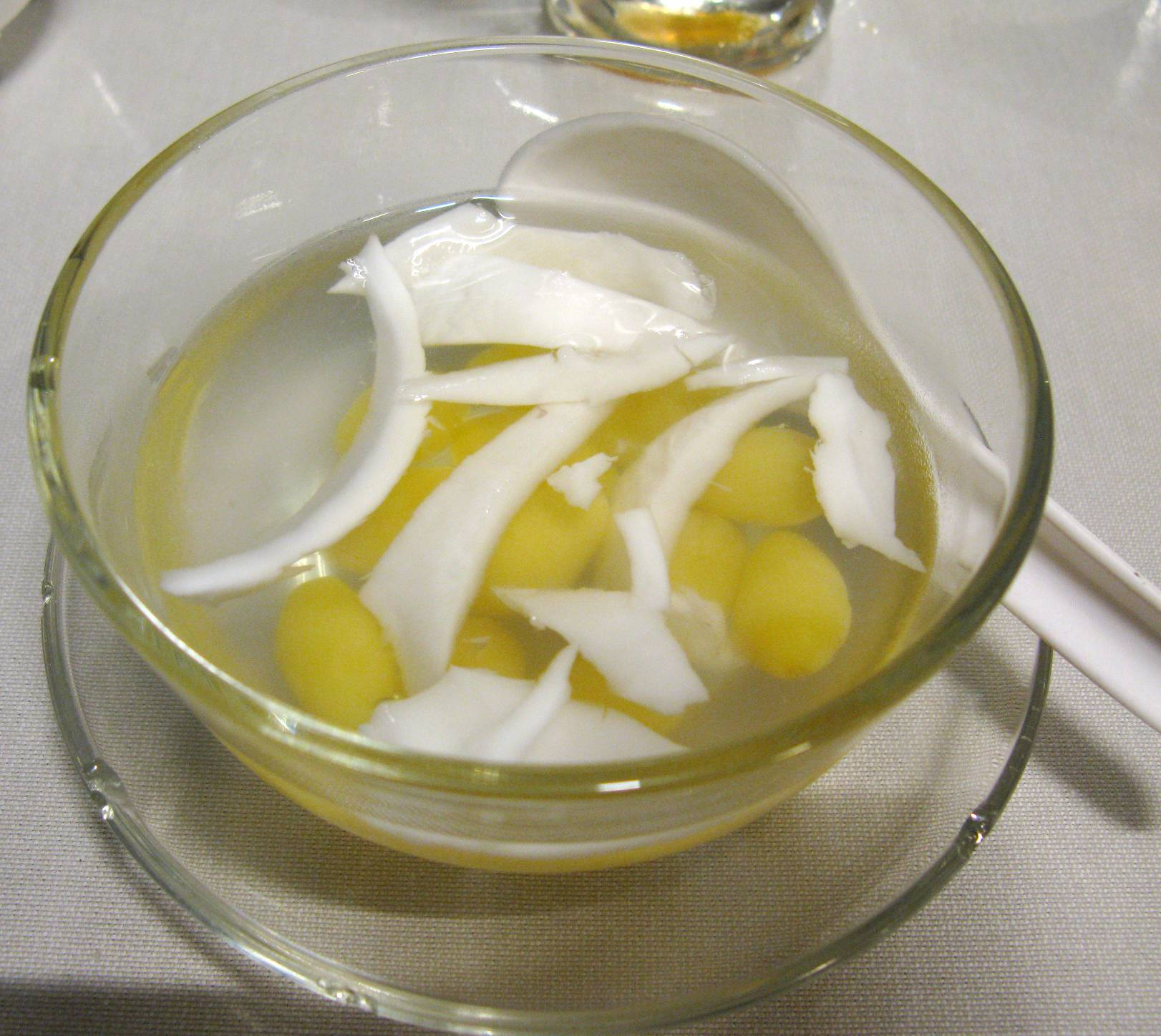
Ginkgo seeds served with boiled coconut flesh as a dessert in Thailand

Despite the health risks, the nut-like kernels of the seeds are sometimes cooked and eaten. They are esteemed in Asia and are a traditional ingredient in Chinese food. Ginkgo nuts are used in congee, and are often served at special occasions such as weddings and the Chinese New Year (as part of the vegetarian dish called Buddha's delight). Japanese cooks add ginkgo seeds (called ginnan) to dishes such as chawanmushi, and cooked seeds are often eaten along with other dishes. Grilled ginkgo nuts with salt are also a popular item at izakayas as a snack with beer and other Japanese food. In Korea, ginkgo nuts are stir-fried and eaten, or are used to garnish foods such as sinseonro.

=== Natural dye ===
Both leaves and seeds from Ginkgo biloba plants can be used as a natural (yellow or yellowish) dye on wool, silk or other protein fibre textiles. The plant's chemistry seems to also add anti-microbial properties to the fabric.

=== Safety and effectiveness ===
G. biloba and its extracts are not approved drugs in the United States and do not have sufficient clinical evidence for uses as a therapy, according to a 2023 review. The United States National Center for Complementary and Integrative Health concludes that, despite extensive research, ginkgo has never been conclusively proven effective for any health condition, including dementia, cognitive decline, or other disorders for which it is commonly marketed. Although extracts of G. biloba leaf are often marketed to consumers as cognitive enhancers, there is no high-quality, peer-reviewed evidence supporting its use for memory or attention improvement in healthy people, as of February 2026. In particular, Systematic reviews have found no evidence for effectiveness of ginkgo extract in treating high blood pressure, menopause-related cognitive dysfunction, tinnitus, post-stroke recovery, or altitude sickness.

In 2014, the Committee on Herbal Medicinal Products of the European Medicines Agency concluded that powdered leaf extract from Gingko folium is effective and safe for improving cognitive function and quality of life in people with mild dementia, listing it as an herbal medicine in member states of the EU. Although a 2021 umbrella review concluded that G. biloba may be useful and safe for improving cognitive function and daily living activities in people with Alzheimer's disease, a 2023 analysis concluded there is insufficient evidence to support its use in Alzheimer's therapy.

A 2016 systematic review concluded that G. biloba extract reduced tardive dyskinesia symptoms in people with schizophrenia and is generally safe.

A 2026 Cochrane review found that G. biloba shows little to no meaningful benefit for mild cognitive impairment or subjective complaints, uncertain or minimal effects in multiple sclerosis-related cognitive issues, and small to moderate, low-certainty improvements in dementia symptoms, with generally similar safety to placebo.

=== FDA warning letters ===
Over the period of 2021–2023, the US FDA issued warning letters to manufacturers of ginkgo dietary supplements for false advertising about health claims and misbranding of their products as non-approved drugs.

=== Traditional medicine ===
Ginkgo has been used in traditional Chinese medicine since at least the 11th century CE. Ginkgo seeds, leaves, and nuts have traditionally been used to treat various ailments, such as dementia, asthma, bronchitis, and kidney and bladder disorders. However, there is no conclusive evidence that ginkgo is useful for any of these conditions.

== In culture ==
Symbol of Tokyo, Japan's capital, representing a ginkgo leaf

The ginkgo leaf is the symbol of the Urasenke school of Japanese tea ceremony. The tree is the official tree of the Japanese capital of Tokyo, and the symbol of Tokyo is a ginkgo leaf. Since 1948, the badge of Tokyo University has been two ginkgo leaves (designed by Shoichi Hoshino), which became the university logo in 2004 with a redesign. The logo of Osaka University has been a simplified ginkgo leaf since 1991 when designer Ikko Tanaka created it for the university's sixtieth anniversary.

In professional sumo, wrestlers ranked in the two highest divisions (jūryō and makuuchi) wear an elaborate topknot called ōichōmage (大銀杏髷; lit. 'ginkgo-leaf topknot') because it resembles the leaf of the ginkgo tree.

Ginkgo is an official tree of Seoul since 1971, designated by the Seoul Metropolitan Government.

== See also ==
- André Michaux, introduced the ginkgo to North America
- Bartheletia paradoxa, a unique species of fungus that grows exclusively on Ginkgo leaves
- Ginkgo Petrified Forest State Park in central Washington, United States
- Herbalism
- List of edible seeds
