= Estrogen and neurodegenerative diseases =

Estradiol, the major estrogen sex hormone in humans

Neurodegenerative diseases can disrupt the normal human homeostasis and result in abnormal estrogen levels. For example, neurodegenerative diseases can cause different physiological effects in males and females. In particular, estrogen studies have revealed complex interactions with neurodegenerative diseases. Estrogen was initially proposed to be a possible treatment for certain types of neurodegenerative diseases but a plethora of harmful side effects such as increased susceptibility to breast cancer and coronary heart disease overshadowed any beneficial outcomes. On the other hand, Estrogen Replacement Therapy has shown some positive effects with postmenopausal women. Estrogen and estrogen-like molecules form a large family of potentially beneficial alternatives that can have dramatic effects on human homeostasis and disease. Subsequently, large-scale efforts were initiated to screen for useful estrogen family molecules. Furthermore, scientists discovered new ways to synthesize estrogen-like compounds that can avoid many side effects. These are called nonsteroidal estrogens, which come from natural or synthetic products including plants, fungi, and chemicals.

== Estrogen ==
17-alpha- vs 17-beta-estradiol

Estrogen is a lipid hormone in humans can regulate many physiological processes. It is largely related to menstrual and estrous and its biological function is mediated by binding to two receptors: Estrogen Receptor alpha (ERα) and Estrogen Receptor beta (ERβ). These two receptors are tissue specific and have different influences on their downstream genes. A decrease in estrogen levels can lead to osteoporosis, cognitive disorders, and can affect many important genes related to normal physiological function.

Estrogen can be divided into four classes: 1) Animal Estrogens that includes estrone (E1), estradiol (E2), and estriol (E3); 2) Plant Estrogens (Phytoestrogens); 3) Fungi Estrogens (Mycoestrogens) and 4) Synthetic Estrogens (xenoestrogens). Xenoestrogens contain a large number of compounds that are synthesized or naturally exist. These estrogens imitate estrogen structure and can be designed to satisfy the need of new drugs. They may have a significant impact on neurodegenerative disease treatment due to their ease of synthesis and targeted specificity.

=== Application ===
The application of estrogen on medicine can be divided into a number of aspects. The best known ones are breast cancer and coronary heart disease. Estrogen also plays very important role in animal metabolism balance. These unexpected diseases hindered estrogen to get involved in neurodegenerative disease therapy. So, when applying estrogen-like drugs to relieve neurodegenerative diseases, the concentration should be restrictly controlled to avoid these side effects.

== Neurodegenerative Diseases ==
Neurodegenerative diseases are diseases caused along the process of neurodegeneration. Neurodegeneration includes structural and functional loss of neurons or even the death of the neurons. The causes of such diseases can be various but can be concluded into four aspects: genetic mutation, protein misfolding, intracellular mechanisms and programmed cell death. Main classes of neurodegenerative diseases are Alzheimer's disease, Parkinson's disease, Huntington's disease and Amyotrophic lateral sclerosis.

=== Efforts Made on Therapy ===
Different neurodegenerative diseases have different causes and are not well studied until now. There is no clear cure for such diseases but some efforts have been made to research deeper into them. The 10th Global College of Neuroproetction and Neuroregeneration Annual Conference together with the International Association of Neurorestoratology VI was held to discuss on neurorestoration, neuroprotection and neuroregeneration in various clinical neurodegenerative diseases like Alzheimer's, Parkinson's, Huntington's disease, stroke and brain or spinal cord injuries. The main aim was to enhance health care by the use of stem cells, nanodrug delivery of drugs and stem cells, use of multimodal drugs as well as a combination of different approaches. They concluded that the future of neuroprotection could be achieved by the use of stem cells and nanodrug delivery in chronic neurological disorders.

== Estrogen and neurodegenerative diseases ==
Although estrogen is best known for its effects on the maturation and differentiation of the primary and secondary sex organs, increasing evidence suggests that its influence extends beyond this system, and its activity in the CNS may initiate, or influence our susceptibility to neurodegenerative decline. Estrogen has been proposed to act as a neuroprotectant at several levels, and it is probable that deprivation of estrogen as a result of menopause exposes the aging or diseased brain to several insults. In addition, estrogen deprivation is likely to initiate or enhance degenerative changes caused by oxidative stress, and to reduce the brain's ability to maintain synaptic connectivity and cholinergic integrity leading to the cognitive decline seen in aged and disease-affected individuals. There is sufficient evidence that estradiol is a powerful neuroprotectant which might have use against AD, stroke and Parkinson's disease both in women and men.

=== Estrogen and Alzheimer's disease ===
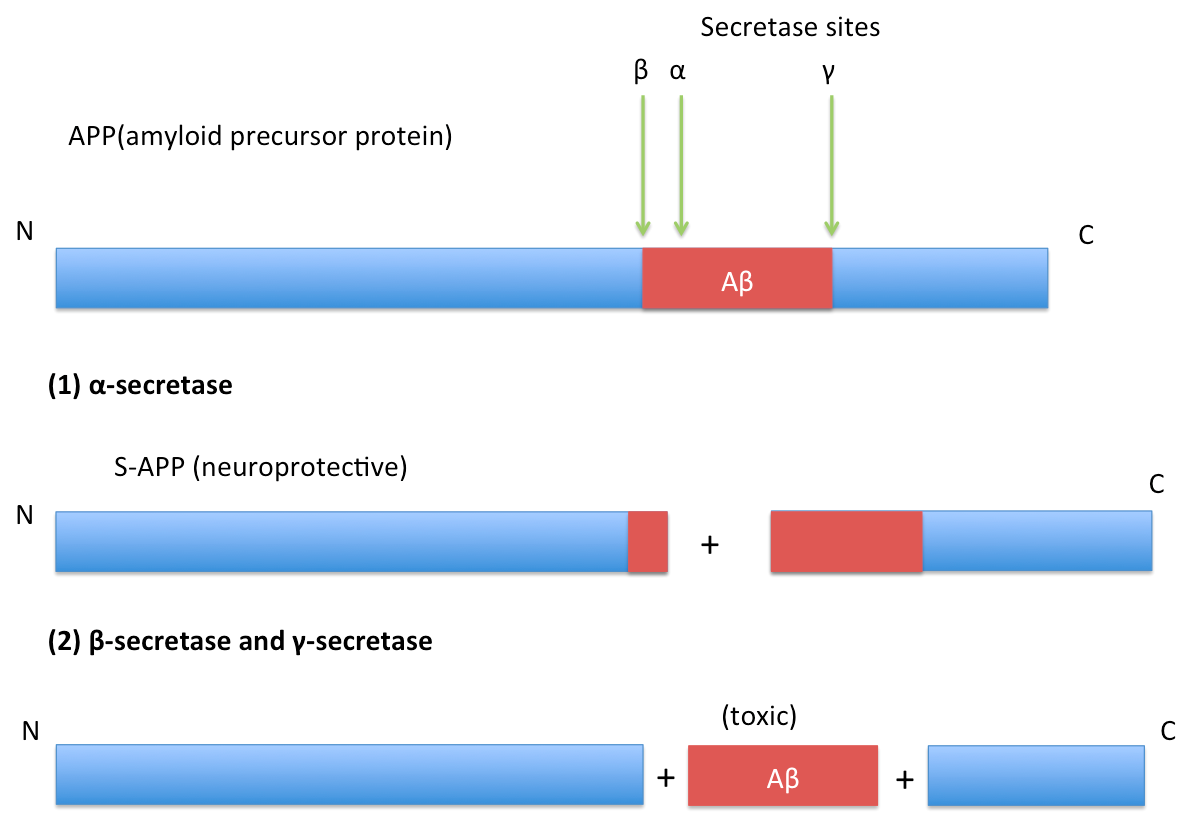
This figure shows how APP cleavage produces toxic Abeta in Alzheimer's disease.

Amyloid plaques formed by amyloid-β (Aβ) deposition and neurofibrillary tangles formed by tau protein phosphorylation are dominant physiological features of Alzheimer's disease. Amyloid precursor protein (APP) proteolysis is fundamental for production of Aβ peptides implicated in AD pathology. By using a cell line that contains high levels of estrogen receptors, scientists found that treatment with physiological concentrations of 17 beta-estradiol is associated with accumulation in the conditioned medium of an amino-terminal cleavage product of APP (soluble APP or protease nexin-2), indicative of non-amyloidogenic processing.

=== Estrogen and Parkinson's disease ===
Recommendations on the use of postmenopausal hormonal replacement therapy in women with Parkinson's disease or those genetically at risk. But another group of scientists found a positive association between estrogen use and lower symptom severity in women with early PD not yet taking L-dopa.

=== Estrogen and Huntington's disease ===
Huntington's disease (HD) is a polyglutamine disorder based on an expanded CAG triplet repeat leading to cerebral and striatal neurodegeneration. Potential sex differences concerning the age of onset and the course of the disease are poorly defined, as the difficulties of matching female and male HD patients regarding their CAG repeat lengths limit comparability.

=== Estrogen and Amyotrophic lateral sclerosis ===
ALS occurs more commonly in men than in women, and women get the disease later in life compared to men. This suggested the possible protective role of estrogen in ALS. By conducting treatment of 17β-estradiol to ovariectomy treated mice, scientists found significantly delay of disease progression.

== Estrogen Replacement Therapy ==
Estrogen Replacement Therapy (HRT) is a kind of hormone replacement therapy. Its goal is to mitigate discomfort caused by diminished circulating estrogen after menopause. The 2002 Women's Health Initiative of the National Institutes of Health found disparate results for all cause mortality with hormone replacement, finding it to be lower when HRT was begun earlier, between age 50–59, but higher when begun after age 60. In older patients, there was an increased incidence of breast cancer, heart attacks and stroke, although a reduced incidence of colorectal cancer and bone fracture. Some of the WHI findings were again found in a larger national study done in the UK, known as The Million Women Study. As a result of these findings, the number of women taking hormone treatment dropped precipitously. The Women's Health Initiative recommended that women with non-surgical menopause take the lowest feasible dose of HRT for the shortest possible time to minimize associated risks.

=== Main Pathways ===
The role of estrogens is mostly mediated by two nuclear receptors (ER alpha and ER beta) and a membrane-associated G-protein (GPR30 or GPER), and it is not limited to reproduction, but it extends to the skeletal, cardiovascular and central nervous systems. Various pathologies such as cancer, inflammatory, neurodegenerative and metabolic diseases are often associated with dysfunctions of the estrogen system. Therapeutic interventions by agents that affect the estrogen signaling pathway might be useful in the treatment of many dissimilar diseases. These pathways also shown great impact on neurodegenerative disease.

=== Application ===
The receptors of estrogen are specially distributed in different tissues, which have different influence on their downstream genes. The activation of the two different estrogen receptors has different effects on human. ERα and ERβ also mediate Selective estrogen-receptor modulators' (SERMs') function, but the selective ERα agitator can always cause some side effects such as breast cancer or endometrial hyperplasia, while the selective ERβ agitator may play an active effect on such diseases. So, the selective ERβ agitator has more clinical value for neurodegenerative diseases). In post-menopausal women, high levels of testosterone and estrogen higher the risk 2-3 times than lower level situation. Women that are not taking hormone replacement therapy (HRT) have lesser risk of breast cancer because of the insulin level increase.

== Nonsteroidal estrogens and neurodegenerative diseases ==
Nonsteroidal estrogens include xenoestrogens, phytoestrogens and mycoestrogens. They are very useful in neurodegenerative diseases' therapy when considering about the side effects caused by estradiol. As the development of chemical synthesis, it becomes possible for people to construct new molecules. Drug companies can exploit naturally existing compounds and synthetic compounds that have estrogen-like activity to produce patented proprietary drugs, especially the contraceptives. Xenoestrogens are synthetic derivatives, meaning they are chemically produced. These chemical properties are also found in every day objects including plastic, cigarettes, artificial fragrances, and cosmetics. Mycoestrogens are estrogen that come from fungi that is found in grains and crops. Phytoestrogens are plant derived estrogens and have similar structures with 17beta-estradiol thus may cause estrogenic or anti-estrogenic effects.

=== Application ===
Nonsteroidal estrogens prevalently exist in our environment and have both positive and negative effects on our daily life. But as a possible way to get access to neurodegenerative disease treatment, scientists have developed multiple ways to screen these estrogens and select the ones that have less side effects. Bipartite recombinant yeast system and dual fluorescence report system are designed to screen these potential chemicals.
